= Ōkurayama Station (Kanagawa) =

Railway station in Yokohama, Japan

Ōkurayama Station 大倉山駅

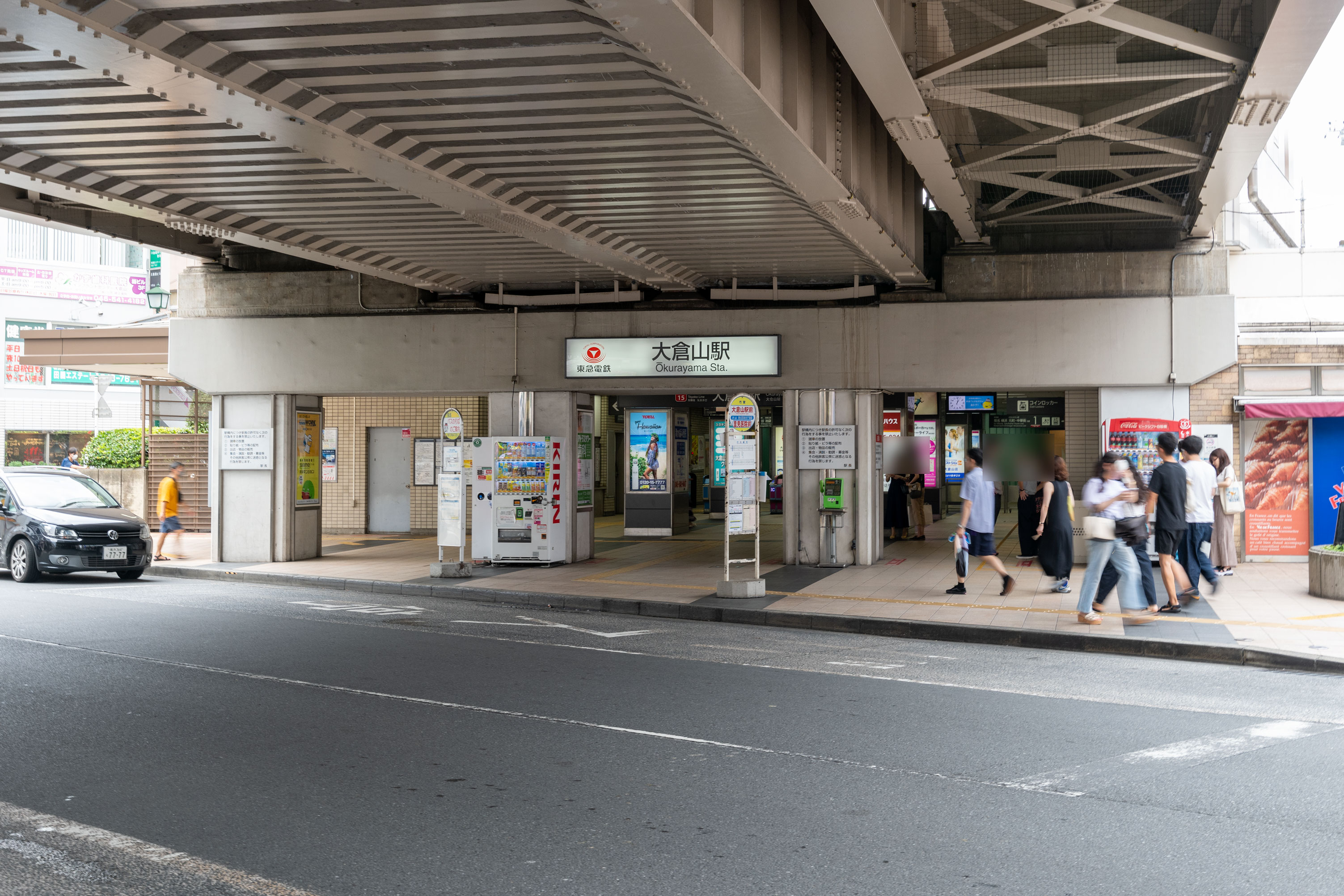
- Entrance

General information
- Location: 1-1-1 Ōkurayama, Kōhoku Ward, Yokohama City; Kanagawa Prefecture 222-0037; Japan
- Coordinates: 35.5220°N 139.6299°E
- Operator: Tōkyū Railways
- Line: Tōyoko Line
- Distance: 17.5 km (10.9 mi) from Shibuya
- Platforms: 2 side platforms
- Tracks: 2

Construction
- Structure type: Elevated

Other information
- Station code: TY15
- Website: Official website

History
- Opened: 14 February 1926; 100 years ago
- Former names: Futo (until 1932)

Passengers
- FY2019: 55,464 daily

Services
Preceding station	Tōkyū Railways	Following station
Kikuna towards Yokohama	Tōyoko Line Local	Tsunashima towards Shibuya
Location
- Location within Yokohama Location within Kanagawa Prefecture Location within Tokyo Bay and Bōsō Peninsula Location within Japan

Ōkurayama Station (大倉山駅, Ōkurayama-eki) is a passenger railway station located in Kōhoku-ku, Yokohama, Kanagawa Prefecture, Japan, operated by the private railway company Tokyu Corporation.

== Lines ==
Ōkurayama Station is served by the Tōkyū Tōyoko Line from Shibuya in Tokyo to Yokohama in Kanagawa Prefecture. It is 17.5 kilometers from the terminus of the line at Shibuya.

== Station layout ==
The station consists of two elevated opposed side platforms, with the station building underneath. These platforms can only accommodate eight-car train lengths.

=== Platforms ===
1	Tōkyū Tōyoko Line	for Kikuna and Yokohama; Minatomirai Line for Motomachi-Chūkagai
2	Tōkyū Tōyoko Line	for Musashi-Kosugi, Jiyūgaoka, Naka-Meguro, and Shibuya; Tokyo Metro Fukutoshin Line for Ikebukuro, Kotake-mukaihara, and Wakōshi; Seibu Ikebukuro Line for Hannō; Tōbu Tōjō Line for Shinrin-kōen

== History ==
Ōkurayama Station was opened on February 14, 1926, as Futo Station (太尾駅, Futo-eki). It was renamed to its present name on March 31, 1932.

Even though the section between Shin-yokohama and Shin-tsunashima stations of the Tōkyū Shin-yokohama Line is right underneath this Station, in a 2008 meeting with the local residents, the railway personnel explained that due to geological difficulties it was decided that the Shin-yokohama Line would not have a dedicated station serving Ōkurayama.

== Passenger statistics ==
In fiscal 2019, the station was used by an average of 55,464 passengers daily.

The passenger figures for previous years are as shown below.

Fiscal year	daily average
2005	49,439
2010	50,901
2015	55,132

== Surrounding area ==
- Kōhoku Ward Office
- Okurayama Park

== See also ==
- List of railway stations in Japan
