= Tōkyū Shin-Yokohama Line =

Railway line in Kanagawa Prefecture, Japan

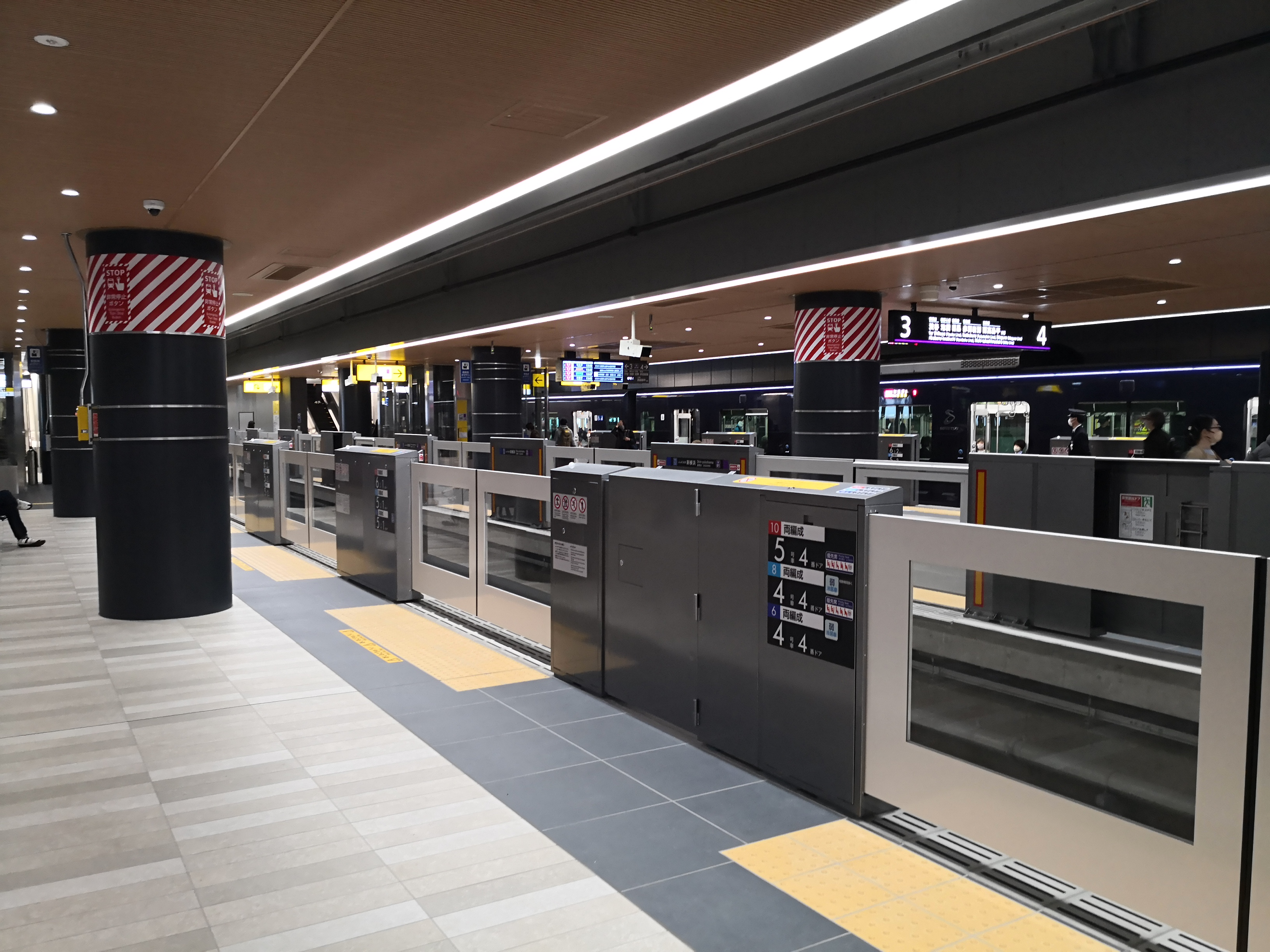
- Platform level of Sōtetsu–Tōkyū Shin-yokohama Station

Overview
- Native name: 東急新横浜線
- Status: Operational
- Owner: Japan Railway Construction, Transport and Technology Agency
- Locale: Yokohama, Kanagawa, Japan
- Termini: Shin-Yokohama; Hiyoshi
- Stations: 3
- Color on map: Violet (#890d84)

Service
- Operator: Tokyu Corporation

History
- Opened: 18 March 2023; 3 years ago

Technical
- Line length: 5.8 km (3.6 mi)
- Number of tracks: 2
- Track gauge: 1,067 mm (3 ft 6 in)
- Electrification: Overhead catenary 1,500 V DC

The Tōkyū Shin-Yokohama Line (東急新横浜線) is a commuter line operated by Tokyu Corporation connecting Hiyoshi Station on the Tōkyū Tōyoko and Meguro lines to Shin-Yokohama Station on the Sōtetsu Shin-Yokohama Line. Tōkyū has put its company name as a formal part of the line name, which is a second for Tōkyū, following the Tōkyū Tamagawa Line.

It is a part of the Eastern Kanagawa Rail Link strategic plan for improving the rail network connectivity of Kanagawa Prefecture. The railway line's infrastructure is maintained by the Japan Railway Construction, Transport and Technology Agency (JRTT). Tōkyū collects the operation revenue and pays JRTT for using the rail infrastructures, then JRTT use this payment to maintain the infrastructures and reimburse the loan for the construction of this line.

The Tōkyū Shin-Yokohama Line opened on 18 March 2023.

== Summary ==
The line runs between Shin-Yokohama and Hiyoshi, with one intermediate station at Shin-tsunashima, adjacent to Tsunashima on the Tōkyū Tōyoko Line.

Sōtetsu Shin-Yokohama Line trains run through service with Tōkyū, Tokyo Metro, and Toei Subway Lines via Shin-Yokohama.

Shin-Yokohama Station is jointly operated by Tōkyū and Sōtetsu. This is the first case for both operators to have a station with direct connections to the Shinkansen.

== Routes and services ==
Beyond Hiyoshi, trains head towards Shibuya via the Tōkyū Tōyoko Line or Meguro via the Tōkyū Meguro Line.

In 2016, Toei announced that thirteen of its 6300 series trainsets (1st and 2nd batch) would be replaced, and in 2019 nine new trainsets compatible with the Sōtetsu Line would begin service, with more trainsets to be produced through 2021. In 2018, Toei ramped up its plans and announced that 13 new trainsets with the same designation numbers as the 13 that are replaced would be introduced to service. These new models are formed as 8-car sets made by Kinki Sharyo and classified as 6500 series. The first of these sets entered service on 14 May 2022. The 3rd batch of 6300 series trainsets continued their service on the Mita Line upon being upgraded to enable compatibility with the Sōtetsu Line, by introducing digitized communications equipment and the ATS-P system. With Mita Line trainsets extending to 8 cars, Sōtetsu underwent preparations to enable compatibility with 8-car trains. Additionally, Sōtetsu has also introduced its 20000 series developed for use on Tōkyū through services; the type first entered service in February 2018.

In mid-2022 it was announced that through service trains to the Tōkyū Tōyoko Line could continue along the Tokyo Metro Fukutoshin Line to Wakōshi and further on the Tōbu Tōjō Line. However, trains would not be allowed to run through on the Seibu Yūrakuchō and Ikebukuro Lines. Passengers must transfer at Kotake-Mukaihara Station. Beyond Shin-Yokohama and Nishiya, Tōyoko Line express trains will run via the Izumino Line to Shōnandai station.

It has been proposed that the Tōkyū Shin-Yokohama Line operate 14 trains per hour during rush hours, with 4 heading to the Tōyoko Line, and 10 heading to the Meguro Line. Meguro-bound Shin-Yokohama Line trains will operate through services not only to the Meguro Line, but also the Toei Mita Subway Line and Tokyo Metro Namboku Line, with further service onto the Saitama Rapid Railway Line. Once connected to the Sōtetsu network at Shin-Yokohama, Meguro line trains will run express along the Main Line to Ebina station.

Station numbers for the Tōkyū Shin-Yokohama Line between Shin-Yokohama and Hiyoshi were revealed on 16 September 2022.

Through the end of 2022, various trainsets from Tōkyū, Sōtetsu, Tokyo Metro, Toei, and Tōbu conducted tests along the now completed segment of this line and the Sōtetsu Shin-Yokohama Line between Hiyoshi and Hazawa Yokohama-Kokudai.

On 16 December 2022, Tōkyū, Sōtetsu, and the Japan Railway Construction, Transport and Technology Agency announced that the Tōkyū Shin-Yokohama Line would open on 18 March 2023. The Sōtetsu Shin-Yokohama Line section between Shin-Yokohama and Hazawa Yokohama-Kokudai also began serving at the same time. The Shin-Yokohama Line opened as scheduled on 18 March 2023, providing through service between Shin-Yokohama and Hiyoshi.

=== Service pattern ===
Upon opening of the line, the typical weekday off-peak services are as follows:

- Northbound (Inbound): 6 departures/hour (Down from a peak of 15 departures/hour during rush)
  - 2 Express trips to Nishi-takashimadaira via the Tōkyū Meguro Line and Toei Mita Line
  - 2 Express trips to Akabane-Iwabuchi via the Tōkyū Meguro Line and Tokyo Metro Namboku Line, with one continuing to Urawa-Misono via the Saitama Rapid Railway Line
  - 2 Express trips to Wakoshi via the Tōkyū Tōyoko Line and Tokyo Metro Fukutoshin Line, with one continuing to Kawagoeshi via the Tobu Tojo Line
- Southbound (Outbound): 6 tph (Down from a peak of 11 tph during rush)
  - 2 departures/hour to Ebina via the Sōtetsu Shin-Yokohama Line and Sōtetsu Main Line
  - 2 departures/hour to Shōnandai via the Sōtetsu Shin-Yokohama Line, Main Line, and Izumino Line
  - 2 departures/hour terminating at Shin-Yokohama

== Station list ==
- All stations are located in Kōhoku-ku, Yokohama, Kanagawa Prefecture.

Station no.	Station name		Distance		Interchange
Station no.	English	Japanese	Between stations	Total	Interchange
↑ Through-running to/from ↑: Sōtetsu Shin-Yokohama Line for Nishiya, Ebina / Shōnandai
SH-01	Shin-Yokohama	新横浜	-	-	Tokaido Shinkansen; Yokohama Line (JH16); Blue Line (B25)
SH-02	Shin-Tsunashima	新綱島	-	3.6	(Despite the close proximity with Tsunashima Station, the two stations are not treated as a pair of interchange stations in the ticketing system.)
SH-03	Hiyoshi	日吉	2.2	5.8	Meguro Line (MG13); Tōyoko Line (for Kikuna, Yokohama and Minatomirai Line) (TY13); Green Line (G10)
↓ Through-running to/from ↓: Tōyoko Line, Fukutoshin Line, Tojo Line to Shinrin-kōen; Meguro Line for Meguro, Mita Line towards Nishi-takashimadaira / Namboku Line, Saitama Railway Line towards Urawa-misono

== Rolling stock ==
- Tokyu 5050-4000 series 10-car trains
- Tokyu 5080 series 8-car trains
- Tokyu 3000 series 8-car trains
- Tokyu 3020 series 8-car trains
- Sotetsu 20000 series 10-car trains
- Sotetsu 21000 series 8-car trains
- Tokyo Metro 9000 series 6/8-car trains
- Toei 6300 series 6-car trains
- Toei 6500 series 8-car trains
- Saitama Rapid Railway 2000 series 6-car trains
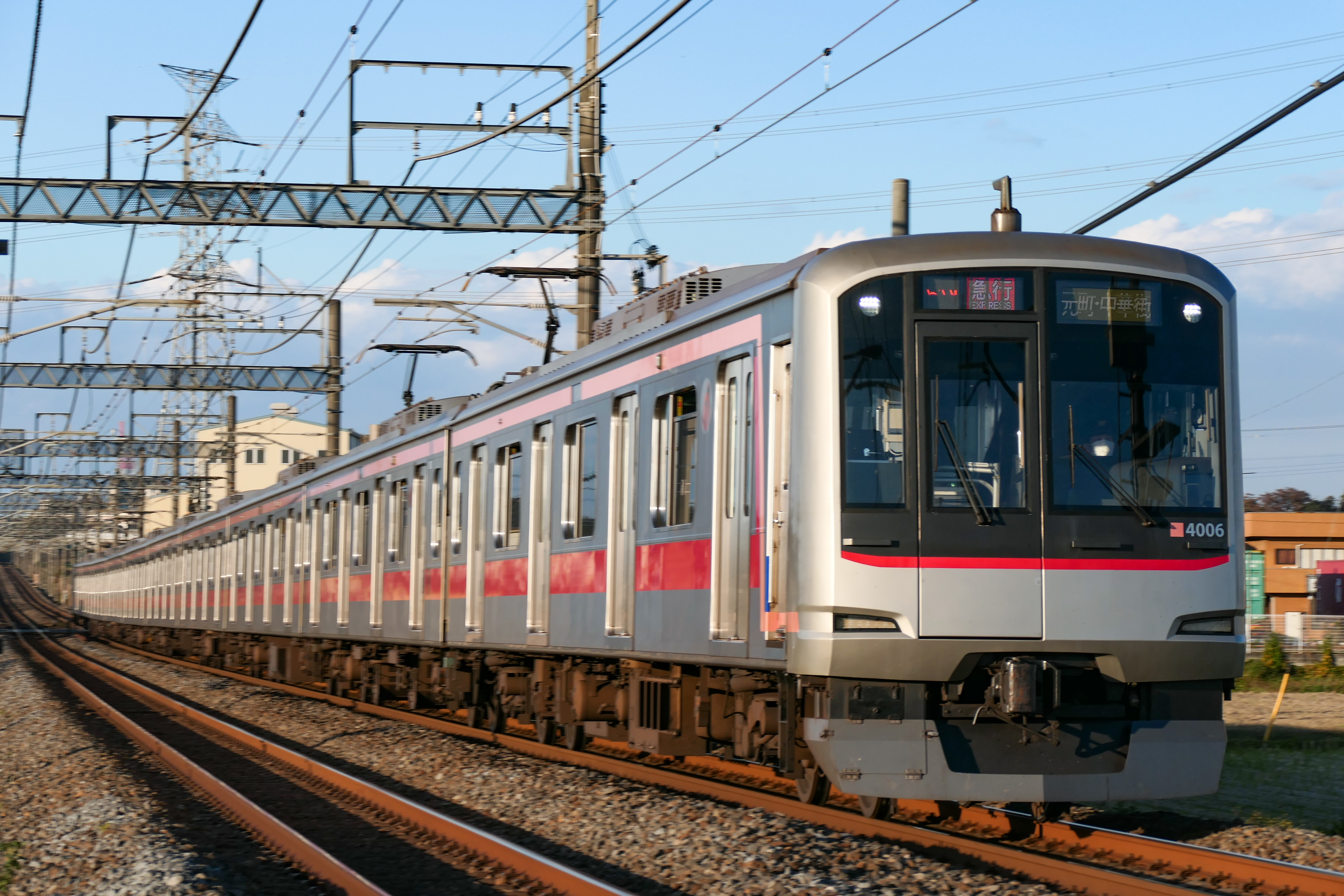
Tokyu 5050-4000 series

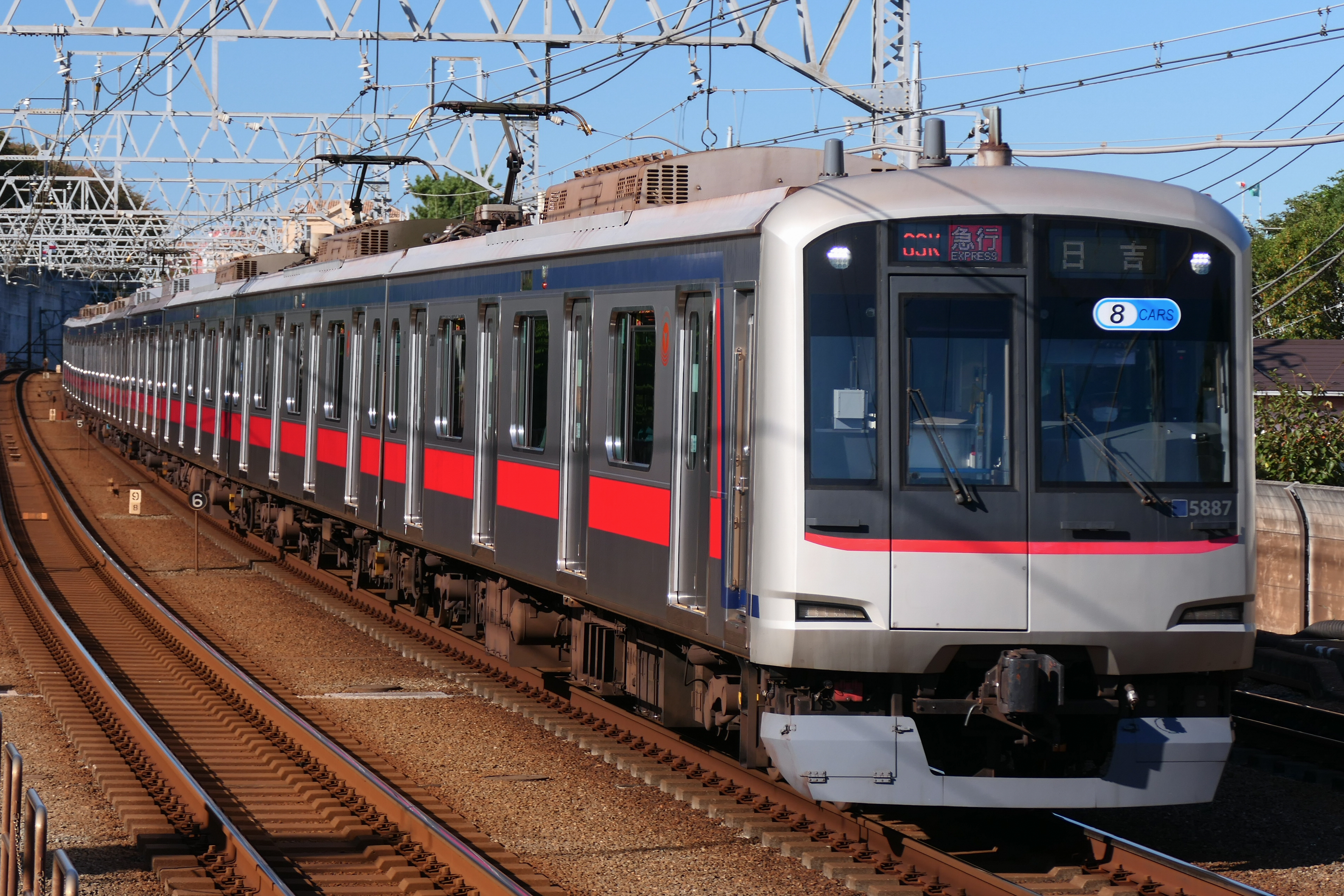
Tokyu 5080 series

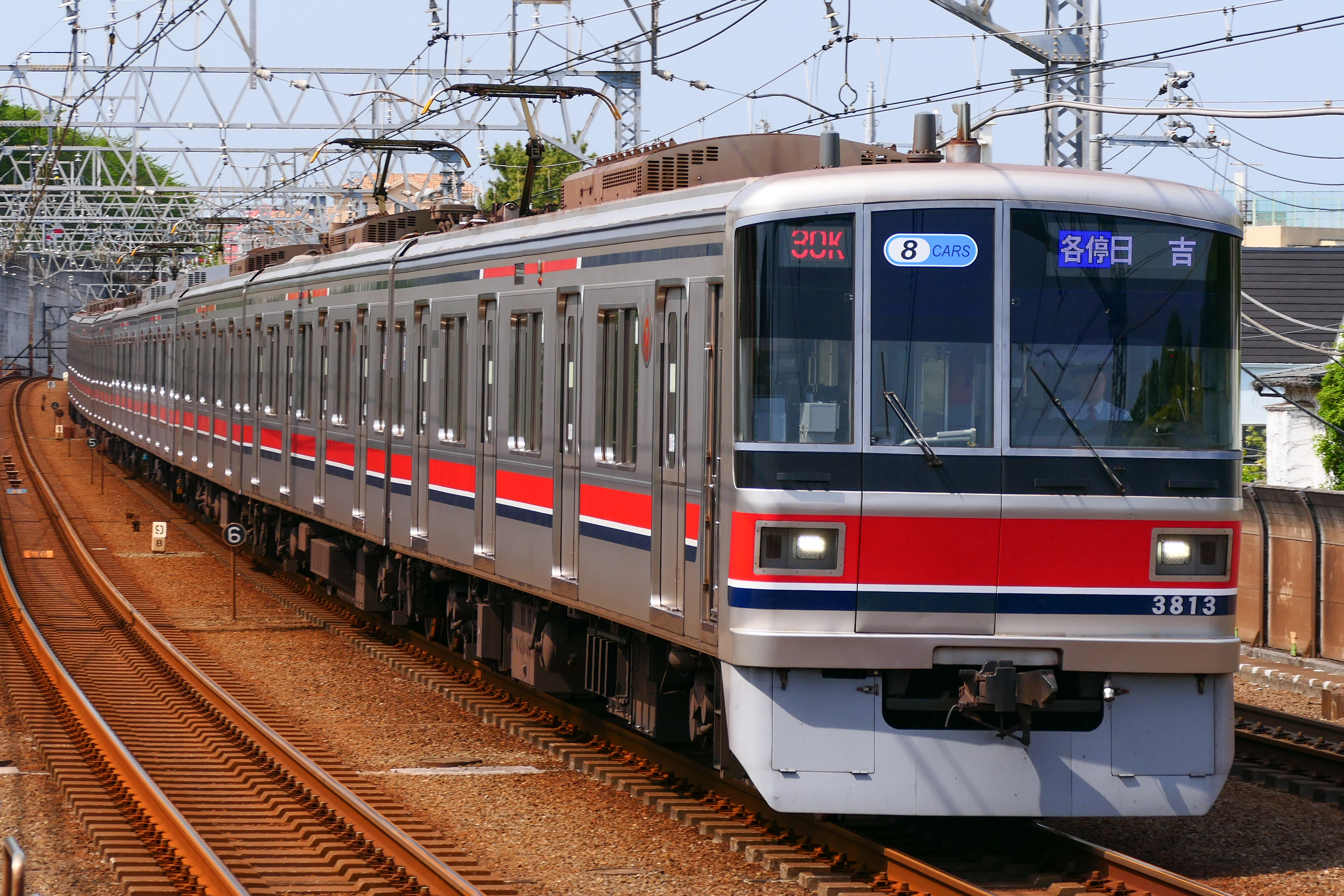
Tokyu 3000 series

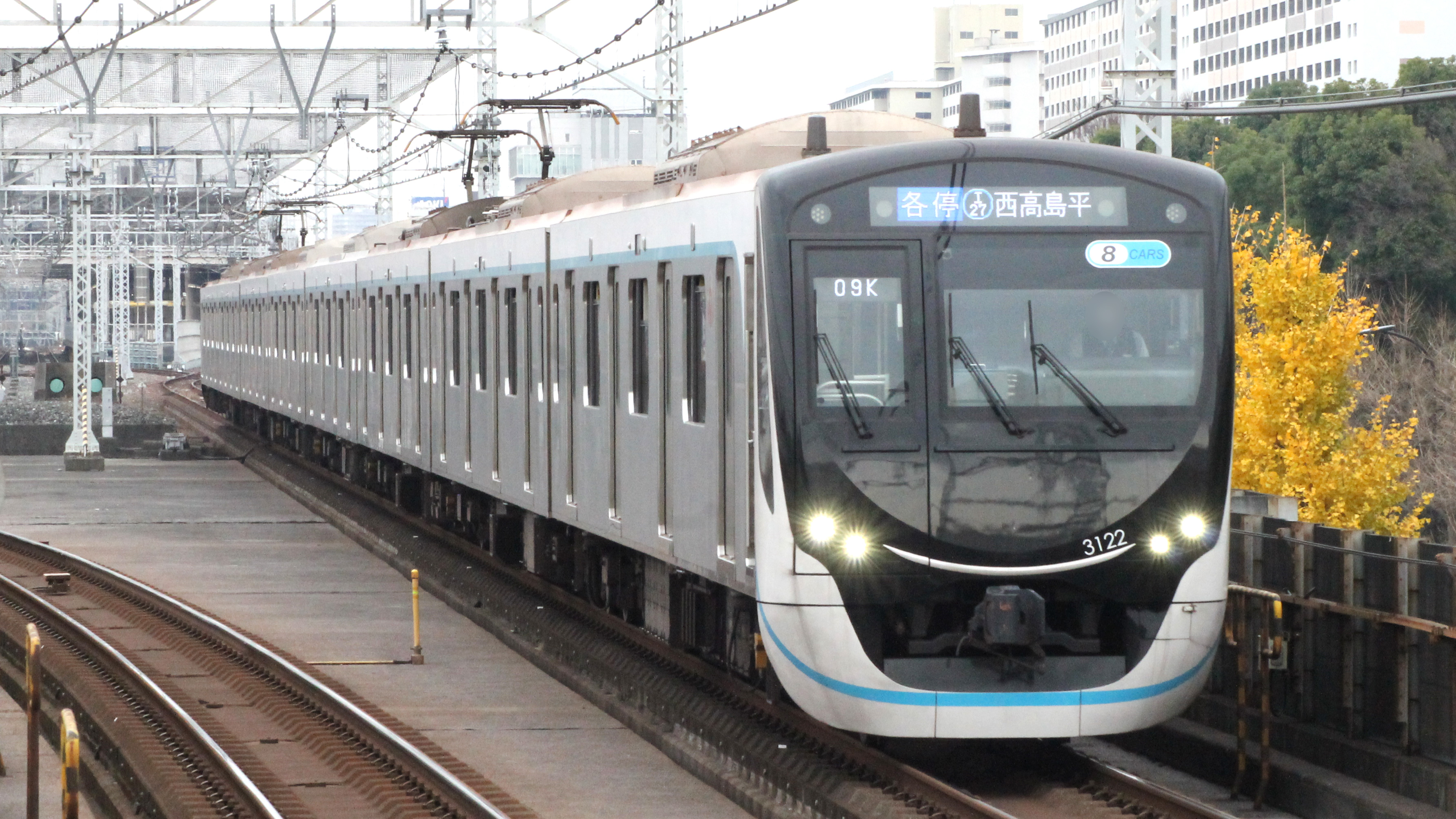
Tokyu 3020 series

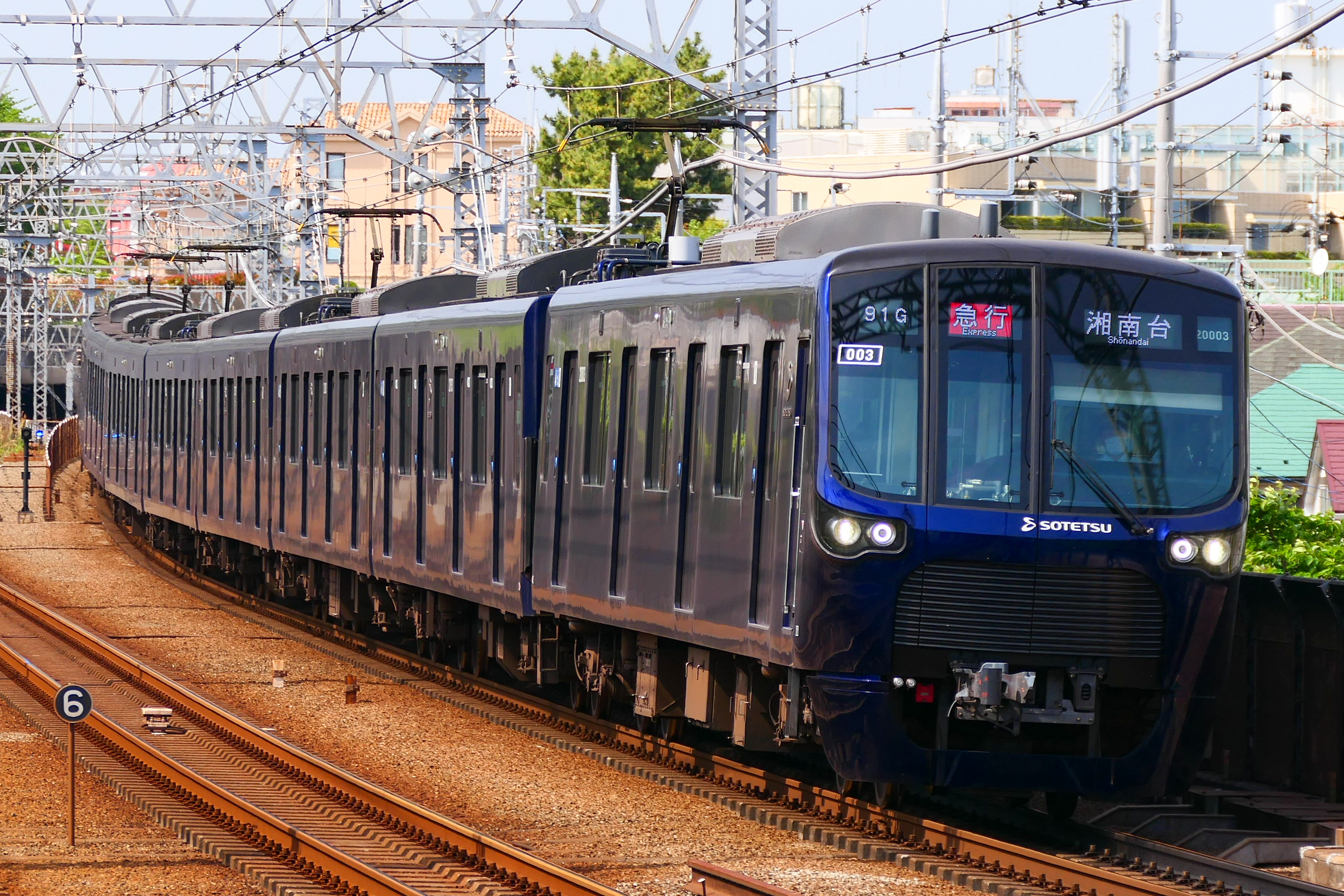
Sotetsu 20000/21000 series

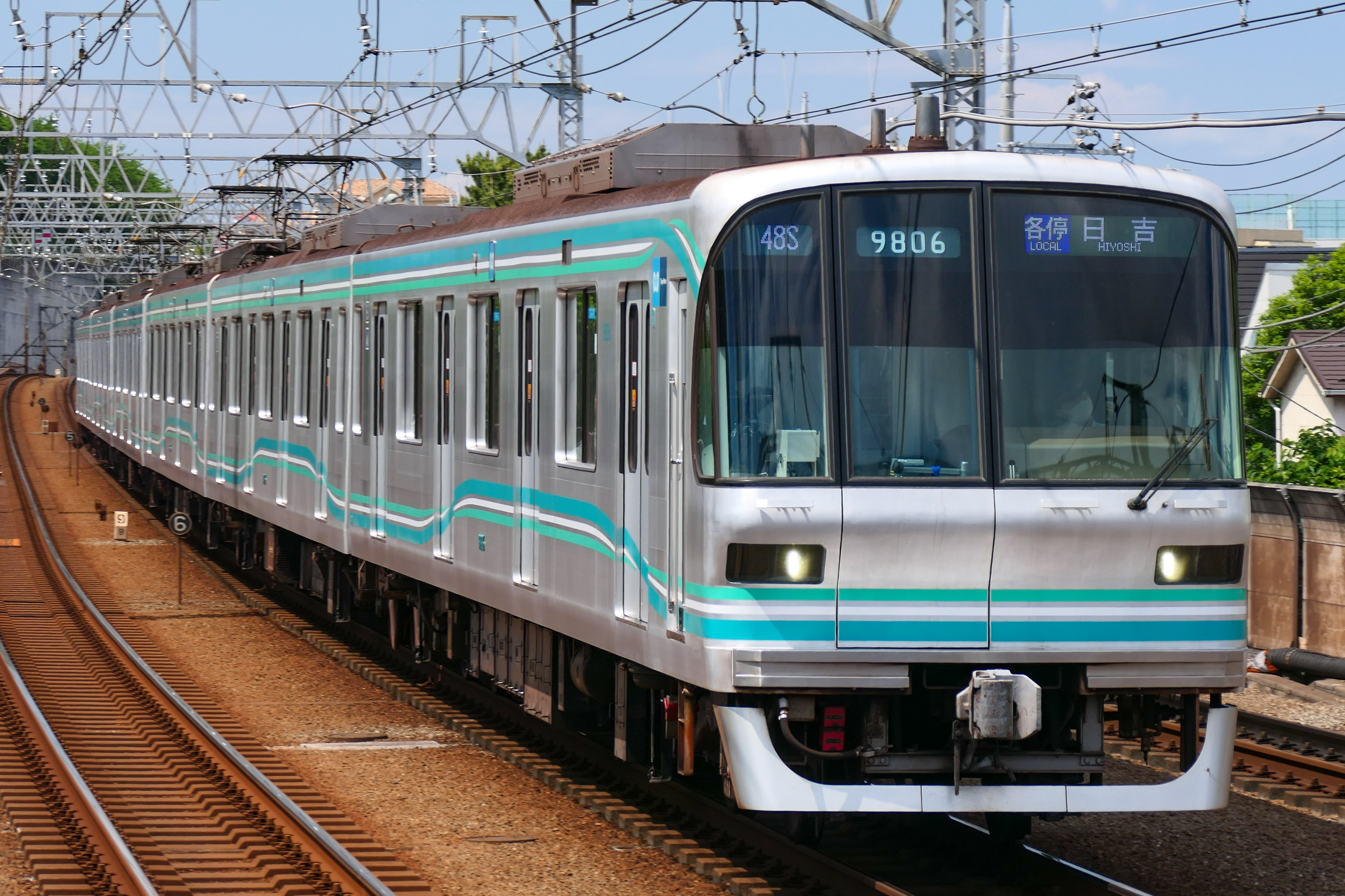
Tokyo Metro 9000 series

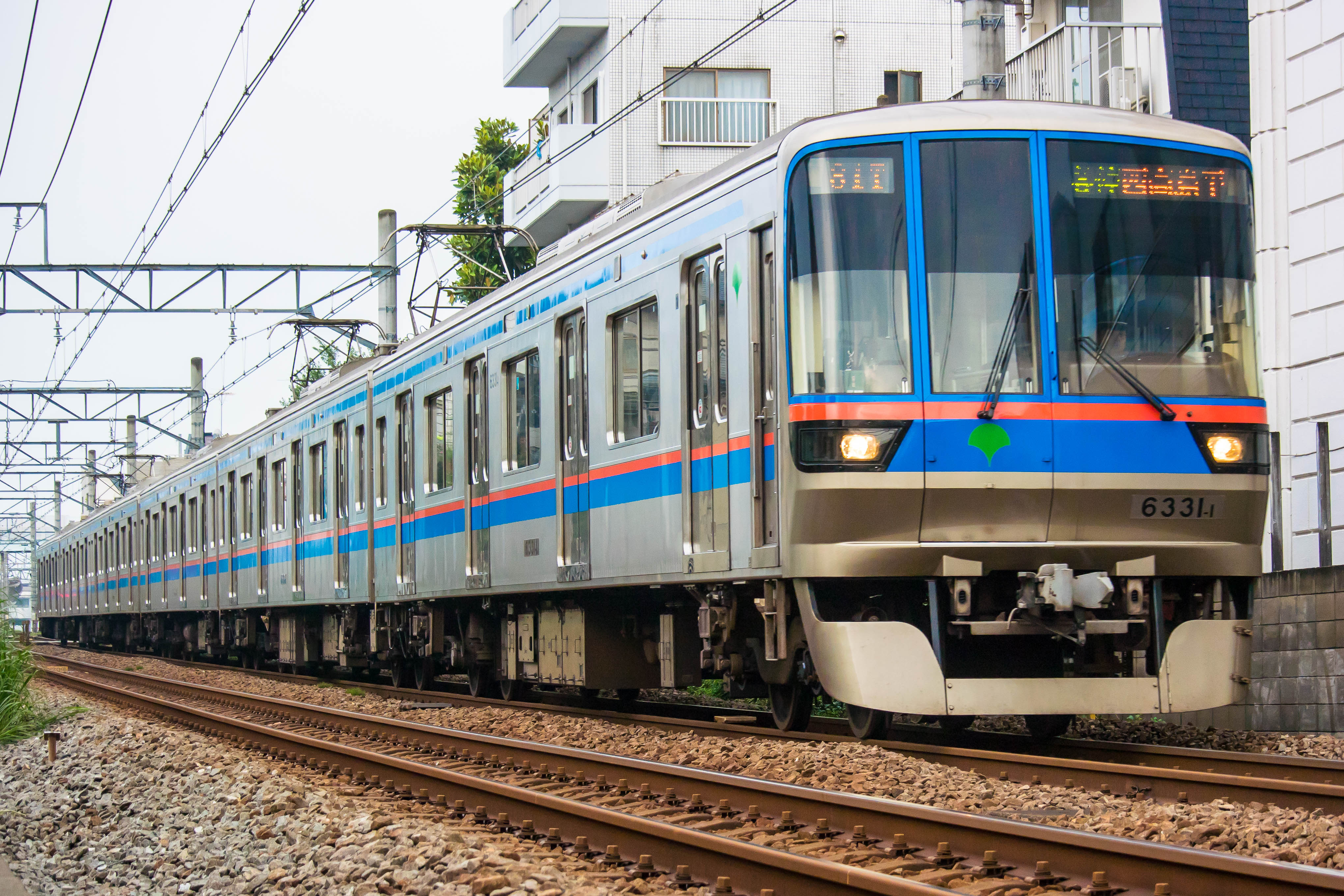
Toei 6300 series

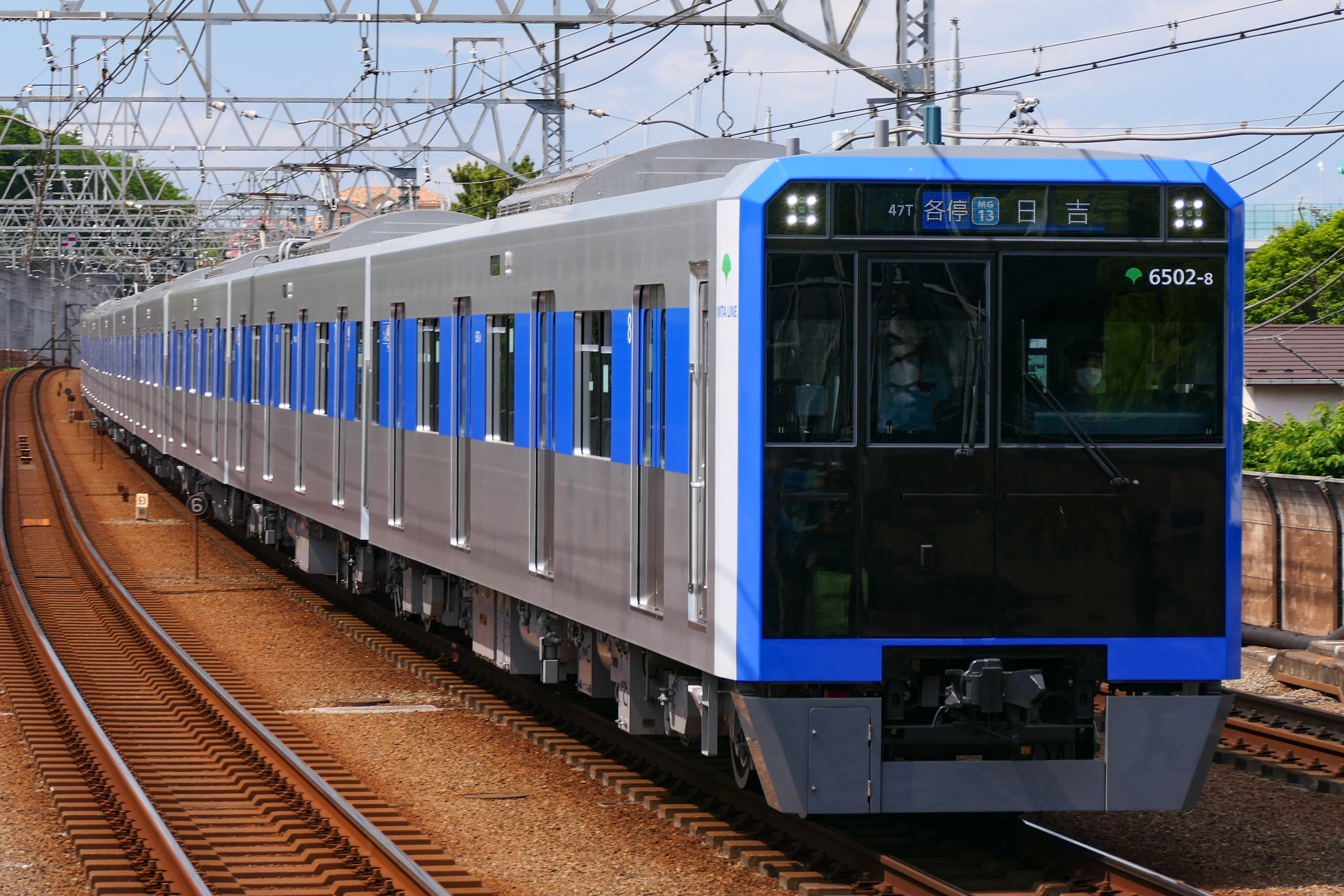
Toei 6500 series

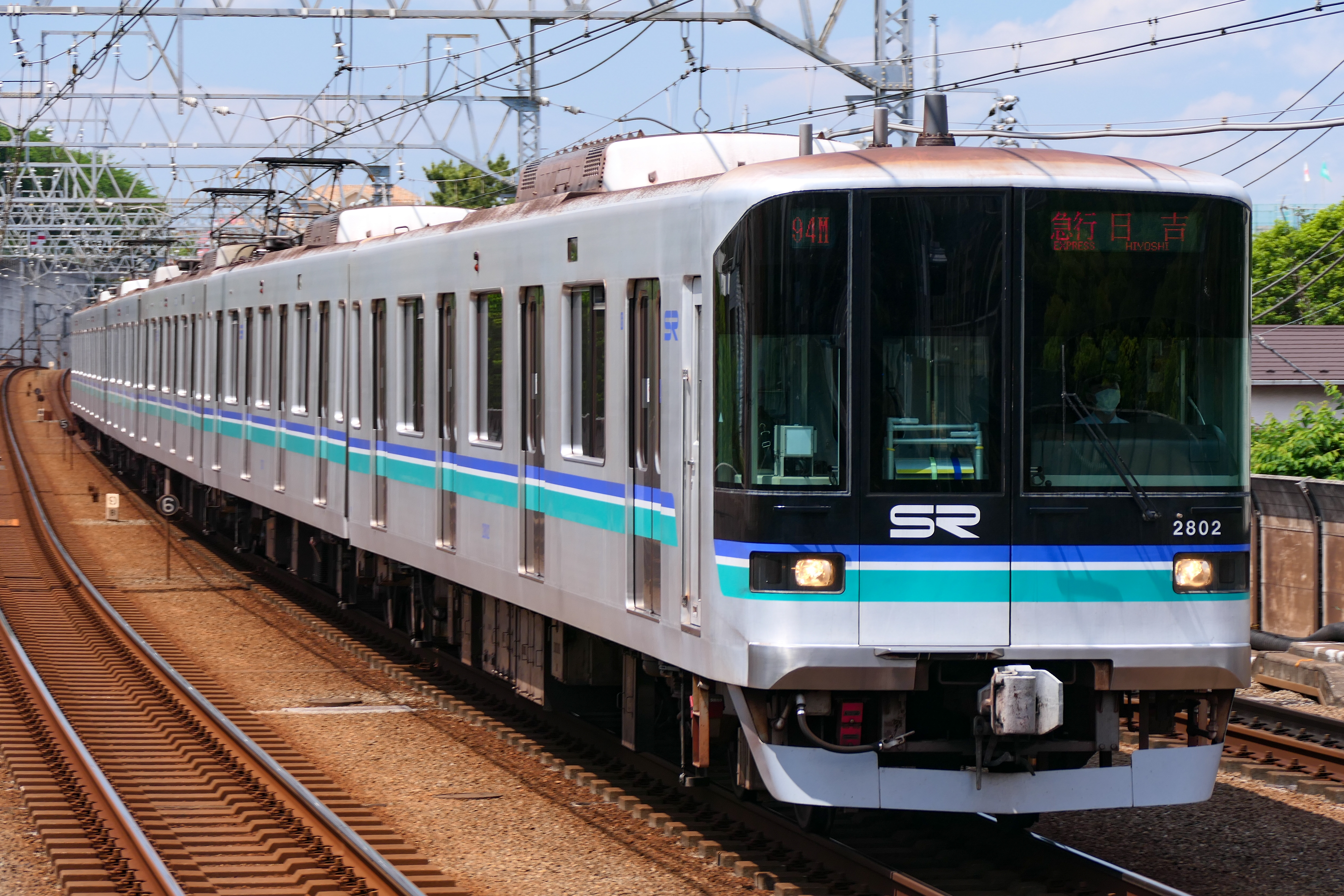
Saitama Rapid Railway 2000 series
