= Hiyoshi Station (Kanagawa) =

Railway and metro station in Yokohama, Japan

G10 Hiyoshi Station 日吉駅

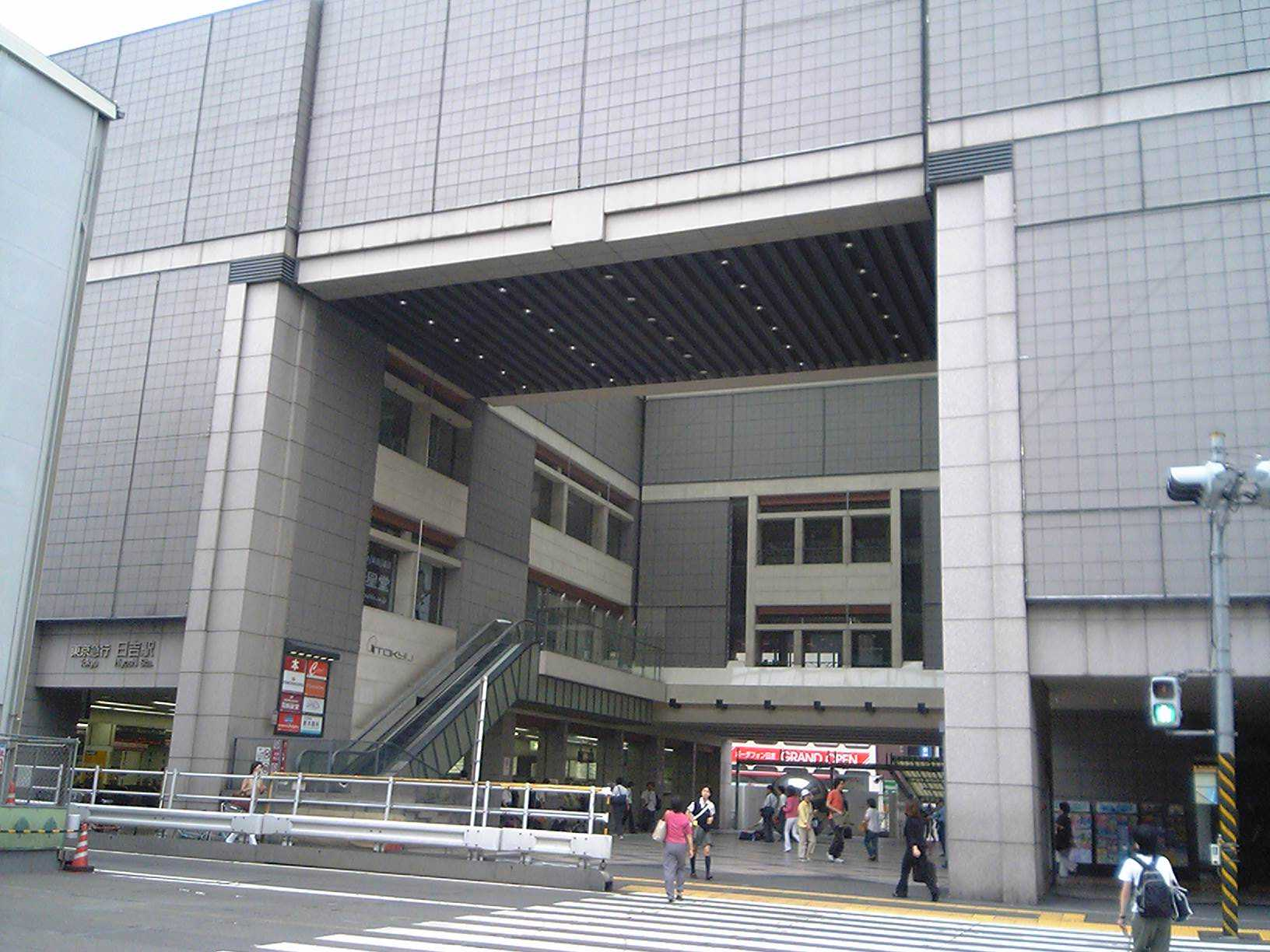
- Hiyoshi Station Keio University Exit

General information
- Location: 2-1-1 Hiyoshi, Kōhoku-ku, Yokohama-shi, Kanagawa-ken 223-0061; Japan
- Coordinates: 35°33′11″N 139°38′48″E
- Operator: Tōkyū Railways; Yokohama City Transportation Bureau
- Lines: Tōkyū Tōyoko Line; Tōkyū Meguro Line; Tōkyū Shin-Yokohama Line; Yokohama Municipal Subway Green Line
- Platforms: 3 island platforms

Construction
- Accessible: Yes

Other information
- Station code: TY13 (Toyoko Line); MG13 (Meguro Line); SH03 (Tokyu Shin-Yokohama Line); G10 (Green Line)

History
- Opened: 14 February 1926; 100 years ago

Passengers
- FY2019 (daily): 163,949 (Tokyu); 84,908 (Green Line)
Services
Preceding station	Tōkyū Railways	Following station
Kikuna towards Yokohama	Tōyoko Line Commuter Express	Musashi-kosugi towards Shibuya
Tsunashima towards Yokohama	Tōyoko Line Express	Musashi-kosugi towards Shibuya
through to Shin-yokohama Line	Tōyoko Line Express	Musashi-kosugi towards Shibuya
Tsunashima towards Yokohama	Tōyoko Line Local	Motosumiyoshi towards Shibuya
through to Shin-yokohama Line	Meguro Line Express	Musashi-kosugi towards Meguro
through to Shin-yokohama Line	Meguro Line Local	Motosumiyoshi towards Meguro
Shin-tsunashima towards Shin-Yokohama	Tōkyū Shin-Yokohama Line	through to Tōyoko and Meguro lines
Preceding station	Yokohama Municipal Subway	Following station
Hiyoshi-Honchō G09 towards Nakayama	Green Line	Terminus
Location
- Location within Yokohama Location within Kanagawa Prefecture Location within Japan

Hiyoshi Station (日吉駅, Hiyoshi-eki) is an interchange passenger railway station located in Kōhoku-ku, Yokohama, Kanagawa Prefecture, Japan, jointly managed by the private railway operator Tokyu Corporation and the Yokohama City Transportation Bureau.

== Lines ==
Hiyoshi Station is served by the Tōyoko Line, Meguro Line and Tōkyū Shin-yokohama Line of Tōkyū Railways as well as the Green Line operated by the Yokohama Municipal Government. It is 13.6 km (8.5 mi) from the terminus of the Tōyoko Line at Shibuya Station, and 11.9 km (7.4 mi) from the terminus of the Meguro Line at Meguro Station. Some downbound (away from the Tokyo Metropolis) trains of the Tōyoko Line (express trains only) and Meguro Line through running to Tōkyū Shin-yokohama Line and may continue onward to the Sotetsu system.

== Station layout ==
The Tokyu station is an elevated structure with two island platforms serving four tracks above ground. The station building is also connected to the Tokyu Store, a large upscale supermarket, and the reformed Tokyu Department Store on the second floor, which features many individually branded shops as well as a major consumer electronic shop (Yamada Denki) as a tenant occupying most of the third floor. The Yokohama Subway consists of a single island platform underground.

The Municipal Subway station has one island platforms serving two tracks for incoming trains to dock in alternating pattern.

The main fare gate concourse of Tokyu Railways is just above the Tokyu platforms which is before the Tokyu Store and bus terminal. The Tokyu Railways and Municipal Subway also share an integral underground fare gate concourse which is sandwiched between the platform levels of the two systems. The integral concourse allows quick interchange between the two systems.

=== Tokyu platforms ===
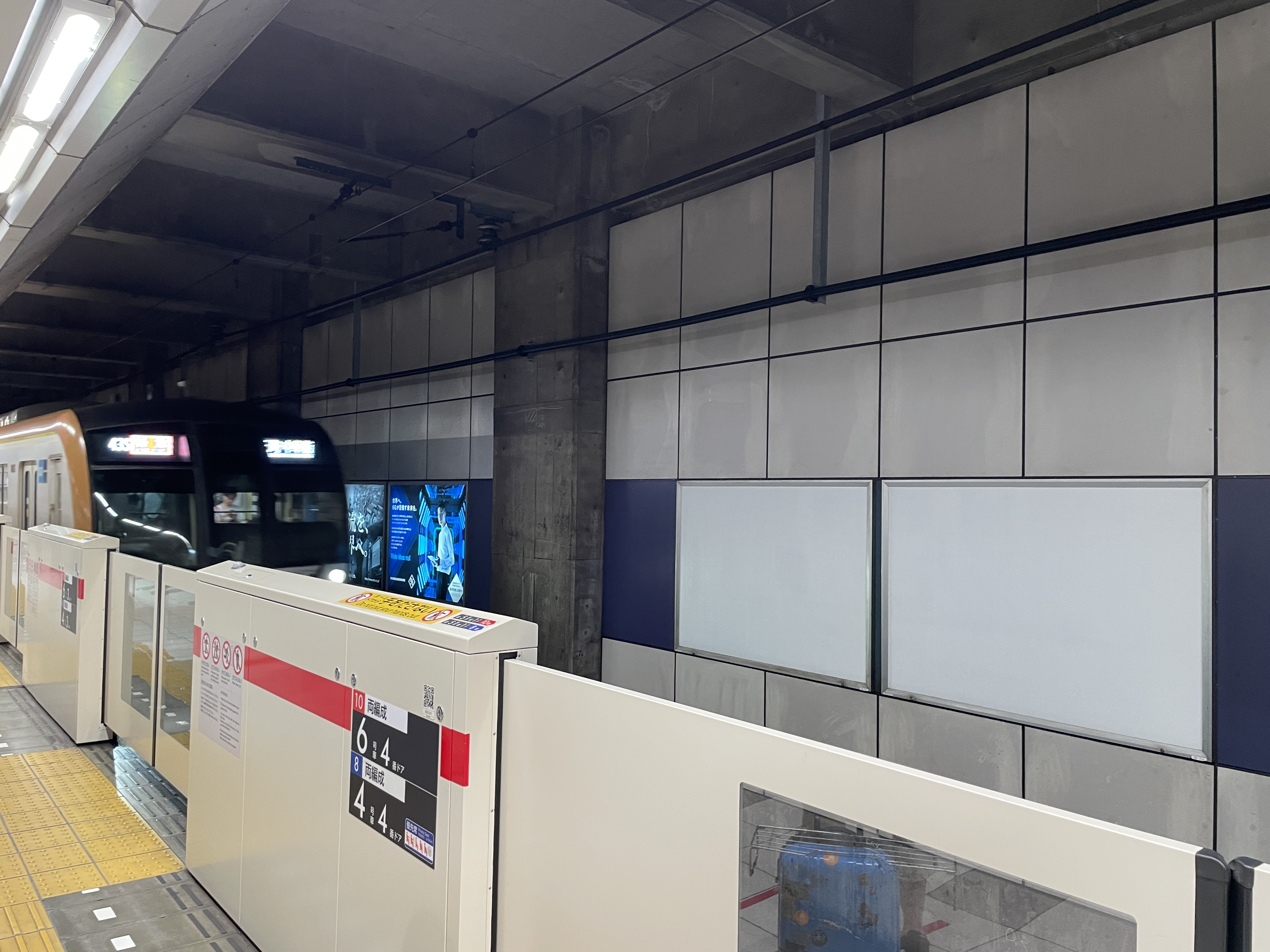
Tokyu platforms, August 2024

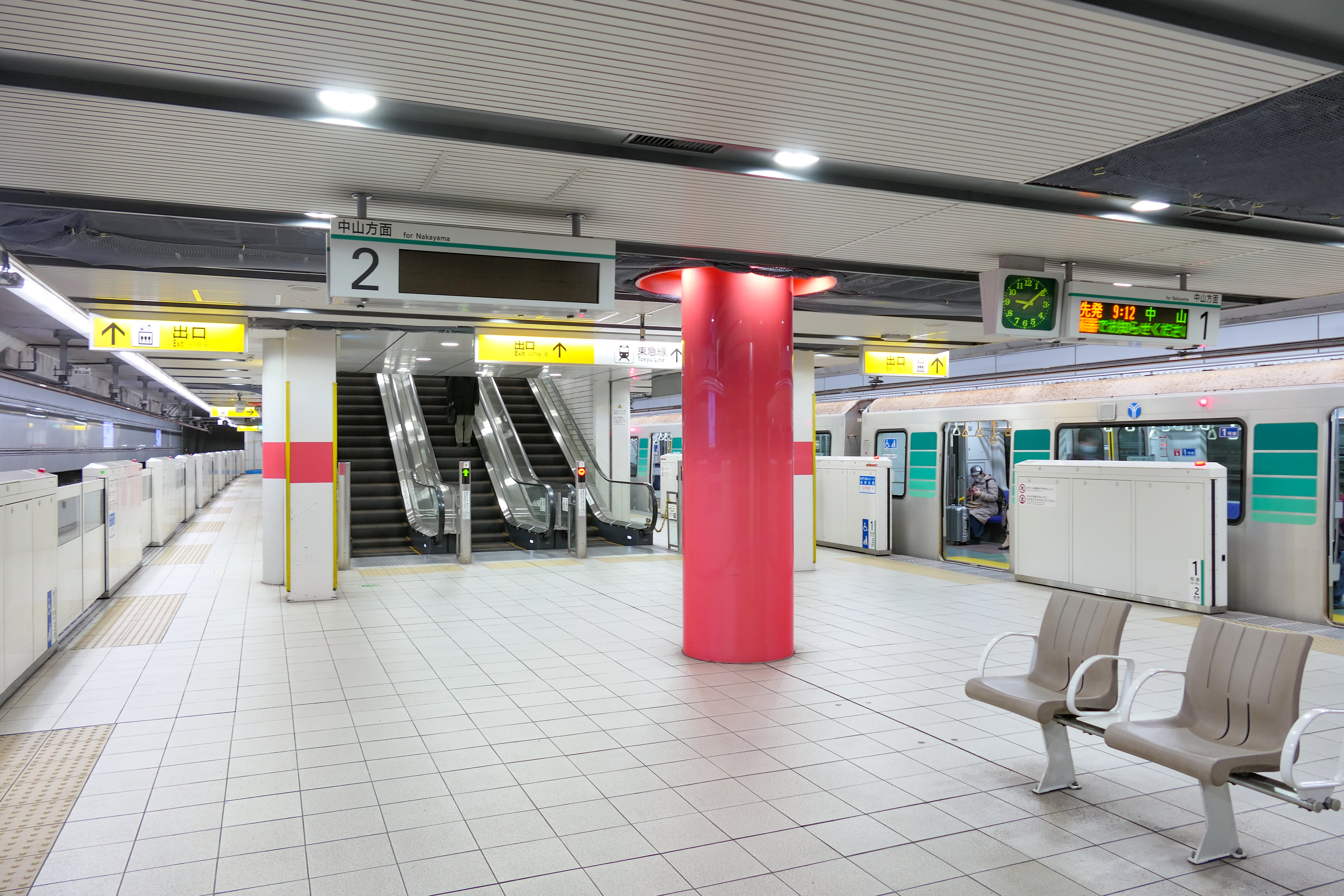
Green Line platforms, December 2021

1	Tōyoko Line	for Kikuna, Yokohama; Minatomirai Line for Minatomirai and Motomachi-Chūkagai
1	Tōkyū Shin-yokohama Line	for Shin-yokohama (from Toyoko Line); Sōtetsu Shin-Yokohama Line for Nishiya; Sōtetsu Main Line for Futamata-gawa and Ebina; Sōtetsu Izumino Line for Shōnandai
2	Tōkyū Shin-yokohama Line	for Shin-yokohama (from Meguro Line); Sōtetsu Shin-Yokohama Line for Nishiya; Sōtetsu Main Line for Futamata-gawa and Ebina; Sōtetsu Izumino Line for Shōnandai
2	Meguro Line	Termination track
3	Meguro Line	for Musashi-kosugi, Ōokayama, and Meguro; Tokyo Metro Namboku Line for Akabane-Iwabuchi; Saitama Rapid Railway Line for Urawa-Misono; Toei Mita Line for Nishi-Takashimadaira
4	Toyoko Line	for Musashi-kosugi, Jiyūgaoka, and Shibuya; Tokyo Metro Fukutoshin Line for Kotake-Mukaihara and Wakōshi; Seibu Yūrakuchō Line for Nerima; Seibu Ikebukuro Line for Kotesashi and Hannō; Tobu Tojo Line for Kawagoeshi and Ogawamachi

=== Yokohama Municipal Subway platforms ===
1/2	Green Line	for Center Kita, Center Minami, and Nakayama

== History ==
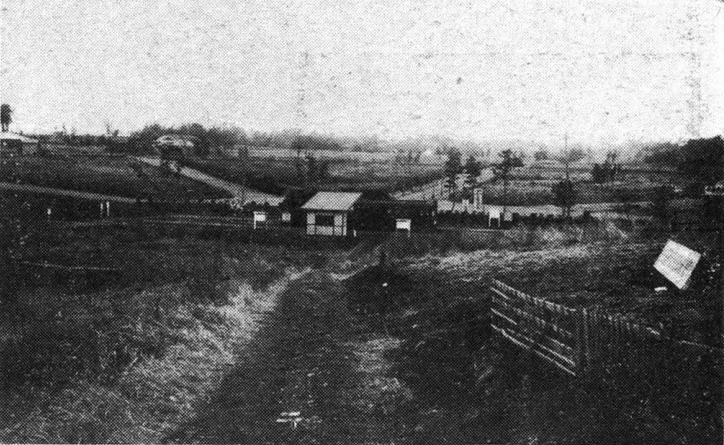
The area around Hiyoshi Station prior to development in 1922.

Hiyoshi Station opened as one of the original Tōyoko Line stations on 14 February 1926. The station was completely rebuilt in 1991 with half-submerged tracks and an elevated station building constructed above the tracks. The adjacent Tokyu Department store opened in 1995. The Yokohama Subway Green Line connected to Hiyoshi Station on March 30, 2008.

The Tōkyū Shin-yokohama Line from Shin-yokohama to Hiyoshi opened on 18 March 2023, enabling through services between the Tōkyū Tōyoko Line, the Tōkyū Meguro Line and the Sōtetsu Shin-yokohama Line. As a result, the station was assigned station number SH03 when these services began revenue operations.

Since the opening of the Shin-yokohama Line, most southbound express trains of the Meguro Line continue onward to the Shin-yokohama Line instead of terminating at Hiyoshi, while about half of the Meguro Line local trains remain terminating at/departing from Hiyoshi. Only some of the southbound express trains of the Tōyoko Line enter Shin-yokohama Line. The rest of the express, all limited express, commuter express and local trains remain on the Tōyoko Line for Kikuna, Yokohama and Motomachi-Chūkagai.

== Passenger statistics ==
In fiscal 2019, the Tokyu station was used by an average of 206,301 passengers daily. During the same period, the Yokohama Municipal Subway was used by an average of 84,908 passengers daily,

The daily average passenger figures for previous years (boarding passengers only) are as shown below.

Fiscal year	Tokyu	
2005	64,773	NA
2010	106,129	29,173
2015	119,008	38,164

== Surrounding area ==
- Keio University Hiyoshi Campus
- Keio University Yagami Campus (Faculty of Science and Engineering)
- Keio Senior High School
- Nihon University High School / Junior High School
- Tokyo College of Photography

== See also ==
- List of railway stations in Japan
