= Shin-Tsunashima Station =

Railway station in Japan

Shin-Tsunashima Station 新綱島駅

- Station entrance (4 May 2026)

General information
- Location: 1-8 Tsunashima Higashi, Kōhoku Ward, Yokohama City; Kanagawa Prefecture; Japan
- Coordinates: 35°32′11.9″N 139°38′10.2″E
- Operator: Tōkyū Railways
- Line: Tōkyū Shin-Yokohama Line
- Platforms: 1 island platform
- Tracks: 2

Construction
- Structure type: Underground
- Accessible: Yes

Other information
- Station code: SH02
- Website: Official website

History
- Opened: 18 March 2023

Services
Preceding station	Tōkyū Railways	Following station
Shin-yokohama towards Shin-Yokohama	Tōkyū Shin-Yokohama Line	Hiyoshi Terminus
Location
- Location within Yokohama Location within Kanagawa Prefecture Location within Tokyo Bay and Bōsō Peninsula Location within Japan

Shin-Tsunashima Station (新綱島駅, Shin-Tsunashima-eki) is a railway station in Yokohama, Japan, operated by Tokyu Corporation. The station is part of the Tōkyū Shin-Yokohama Line.

== Line ==
The station is served by the Tōkyū Shin-Yokohama Line of the Tokyu Railways network.

== Station Layout ==
Shin-Tsunashima Station is underground and features an island platform with two tracks. The fare gate concourse is 1-story underground while the platform level is 4-story underground. The concourse is decorated in pink, while the platforms are in cyan to symbolize Tsurumi River.

The station is close to Tsunashima Station which is served by the Tokyu Tōyoko Line.

=== Platforms ===
1
2
Tōkyū Shin-yokohama Line
Tōkyū Shin-yokohama Line
for Shin-yokohama

Downbound through services:
Sōtetsu Shin-yokohama Line for Nishiya

Sōtetsu Main Line for Futamata-gawa and Ebina
Sōtetsu Izumino Line for Futamata-gawa and Shōnandai

for Hiyoshi

Upbound through services via Tōyoko Line:
Tōyoko Line for Musashi-Kosugi and Shibuya

Fukutoshin Line for Shinjuku-sanchōme, Ikebukuro, and Wakōshi

Tōjō Line for Kawagoeshi and Ogawamachi

Upbound through services via Meguro Line:
Meguro Line for Musashi-Kosugi and Meguro

Mita Line for Nishi-takashimadaira
Namboku Line for Akabane-iwabuchi

Saitama Railway Line for Urawa-misono

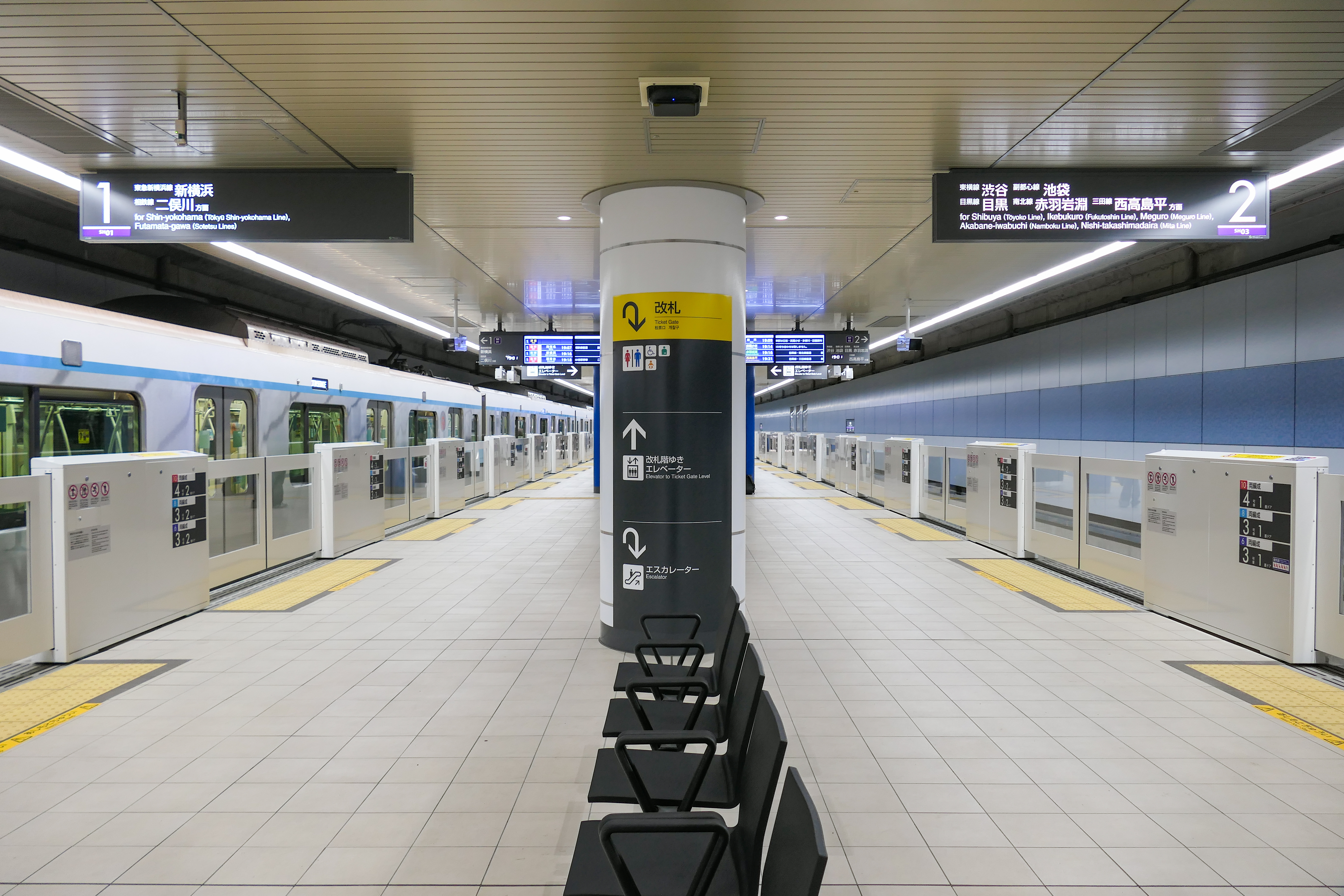
The station platforms in March 2023

== Naming ==
Between August and September 2020, Tokyu Corporation held a public survey to decide the name of this station. The questionnaire asked the participants to choose between "Shin-Tsunashima" (lit. New Tsunashima) and "Higashi-Tsunashima" (東綱島, lit. East Tsunashima) or suggest a different name which is not "Tsunashima". The survey saw 1898 people submitted their answers. "Shin-Tsunashima" won with 381 votes. "Tsunashima-onsen" (綱島温泉, lit. Tsunashima Hot-spring) was the most popular free suggestion with 247 votes, more than the 176 votes of "Higashi-Tsunashima". Other notable suggestions were "Tsunashima Higashi" (綱島東) and "Ōtsunabashi" (大綱橋).

== Ticketing ==
Because of the close proximity between Shin-Tsunashina and Tsunashima stations, all fares between Shin-tsunashima and Hiyoshi are the same as between Tsunashima and Hiyoshi. All season/commuter passes which cover the section between Tsunashima and Hiyoshi allow entering/exiting Shin-Tsunashima without additional charge, and vice versa. However, there is no free out-of-station interchange arrangement between Shin-tsunashima and Tsunashima. Exiting one station and entering the other station is treated as starting a separate journey.

== History ==
Shin-Tsunashima Station opened on 18 March 2023, coinciding with the opening of the Tōkyū Shin-Yokohama Line.
