= Kozukue Castle =

Remains of a castle structure in Kozukue, Japan

Coordinates: 35.512447°N 139.593711°E

- 小机城
- Kōhoku-ku, Yokohama, Kanagawa Prefecture, Japan
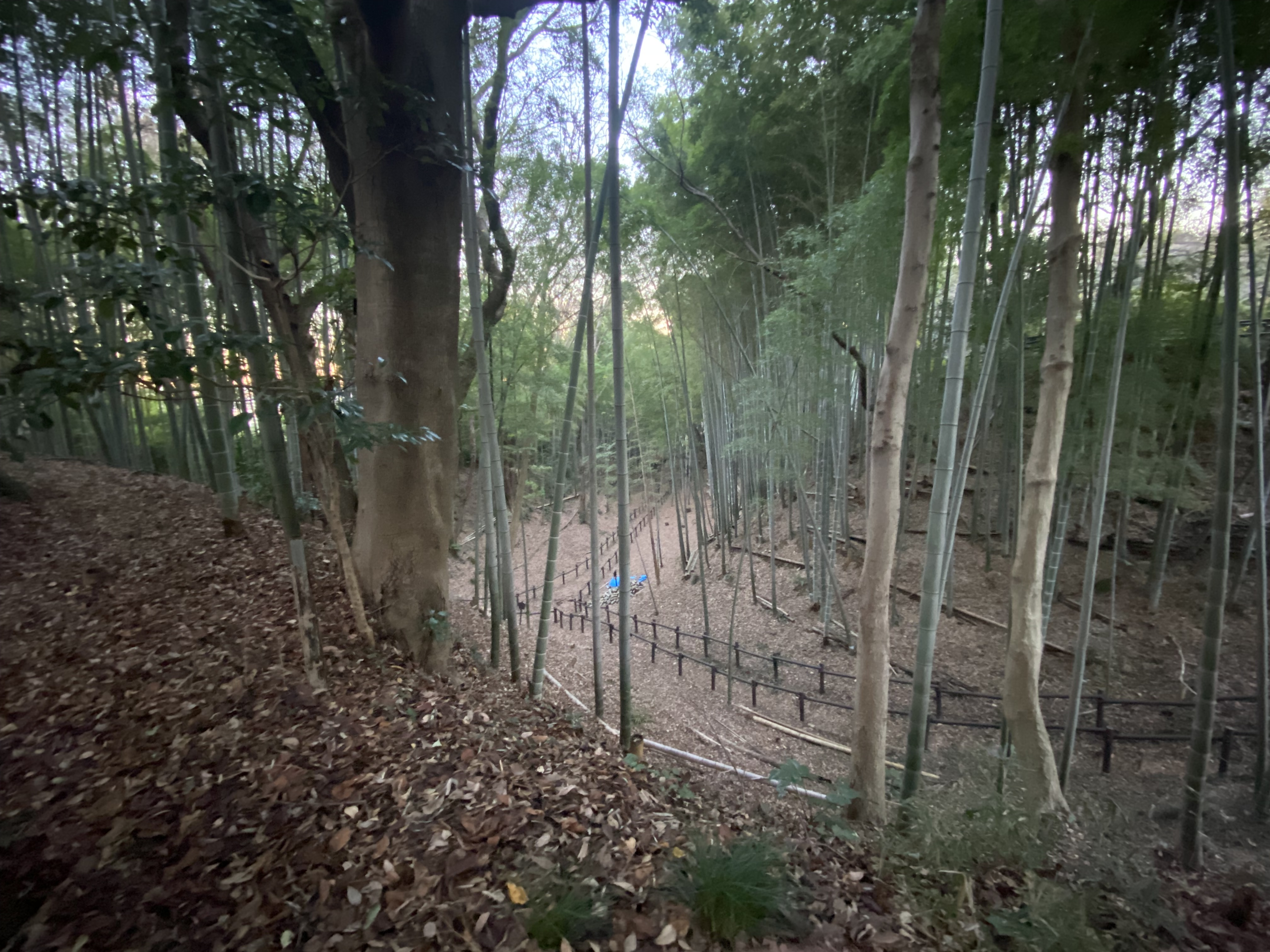
- Moat of Kozukue Castle in 2022

Site information
- Type: Hirayama style castle
- Owner: Uesugi clan, Later Hōjō clan/(Kasahara clan)
- Condition: ruins

Location

Site history
- Built: 14C
- Built by: Uesugi clan
- Materials: Earthworks
- Demolished: 1590

Garrison information
- Past commanders: Kasahara Nobutame

Kozukue Castle (小机城, Kozukue-jō) is the name for the earthly remains of a castle structure in Kozukue, Kōho-ku ward of Yokohama, Kanagawa Prefecture, Japan.

== History ==
The main grounds are located on the top of a hill surrounded with trees. It is not clear when the Castle was built but probably founded by Uesugi clan, around 1438. During the siege of Odawara in 1590 by Toyotomi Hideyoshi, the castle was given up without resistance.

== Today ==
The castle is now only ruins, with some earthen walls and moats. In 2017, the castle was listed as one of the Continued Top 100 Japanese Castles.

Kozukue castle remains are located on the outskirts of Yokohama, close to Kozukue Station on JR Yokohama line. About 15 minutes by walk from Kozukue Station.

== Gallery ==
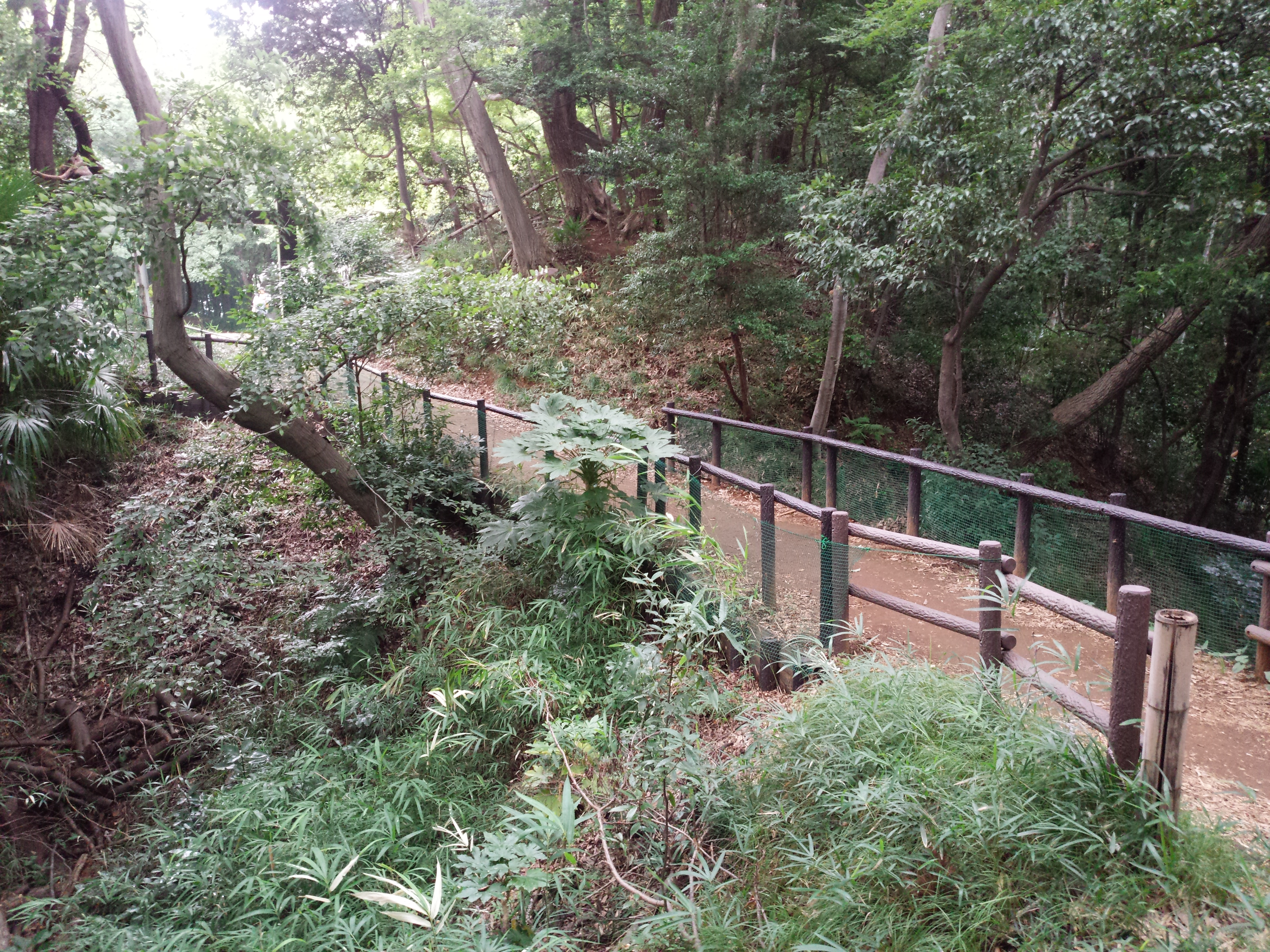
Earthen bridge into the Honmaru base

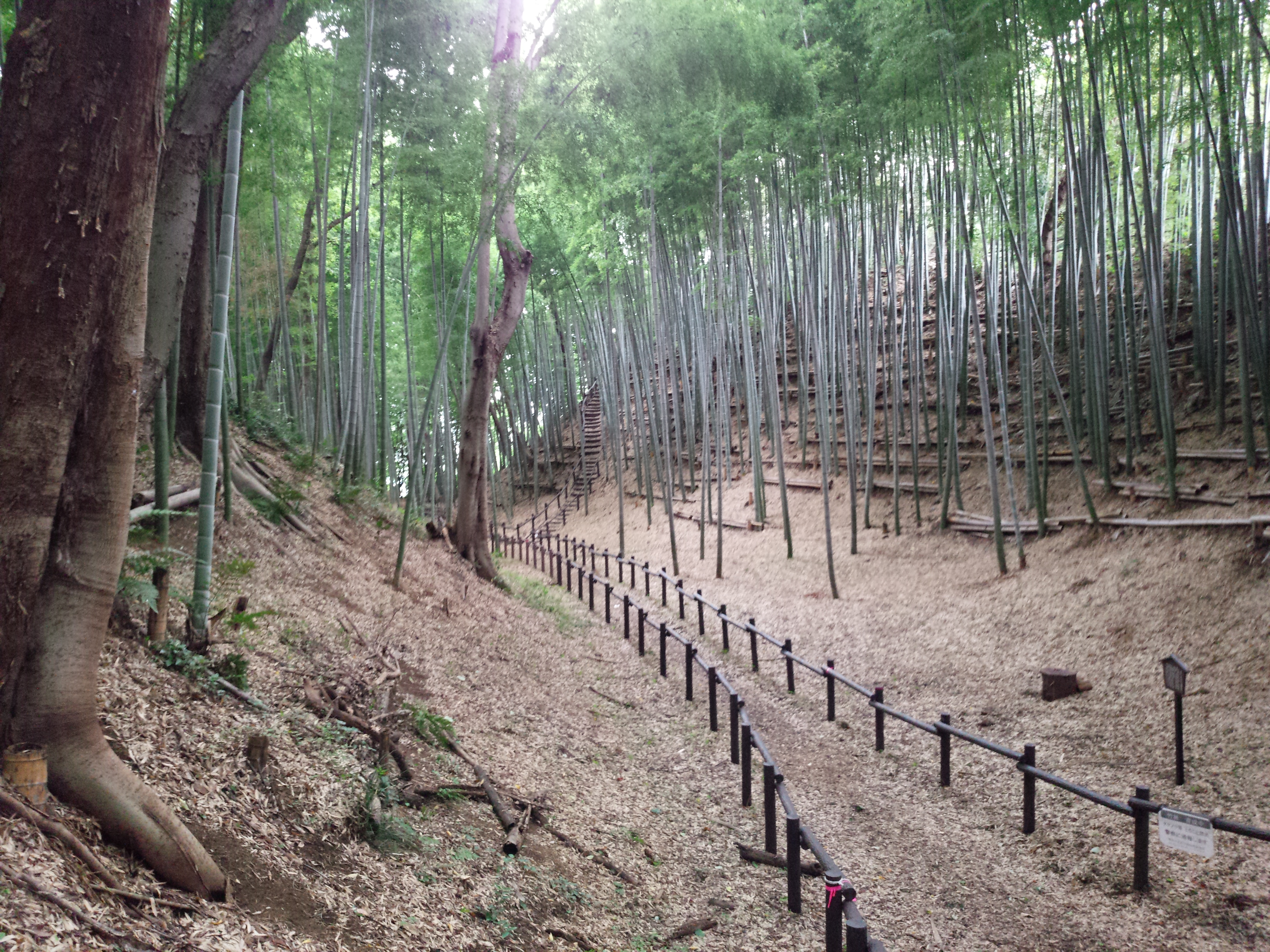
Moat of Ninomaru base

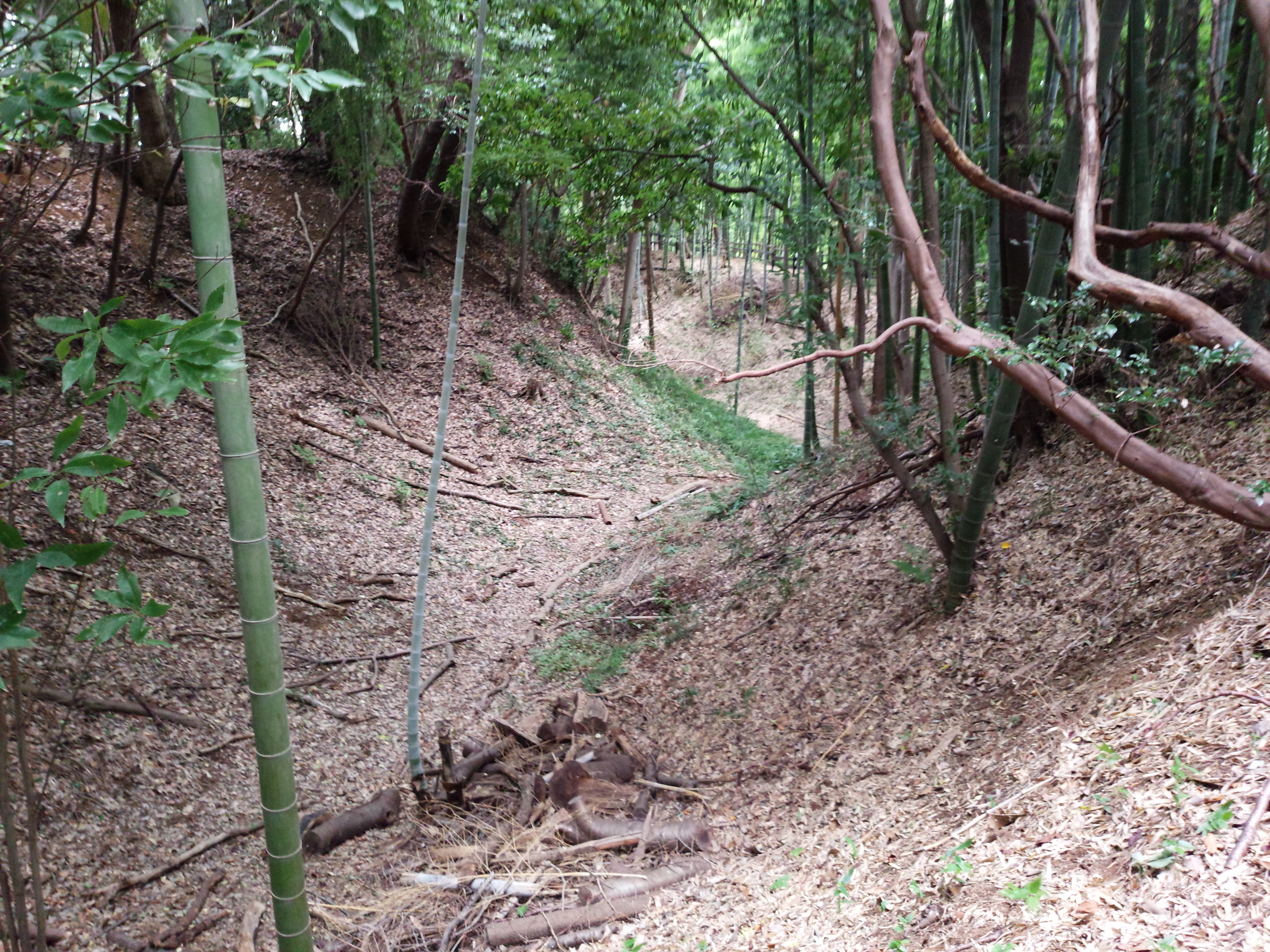
Moat between Honmaru base and small base

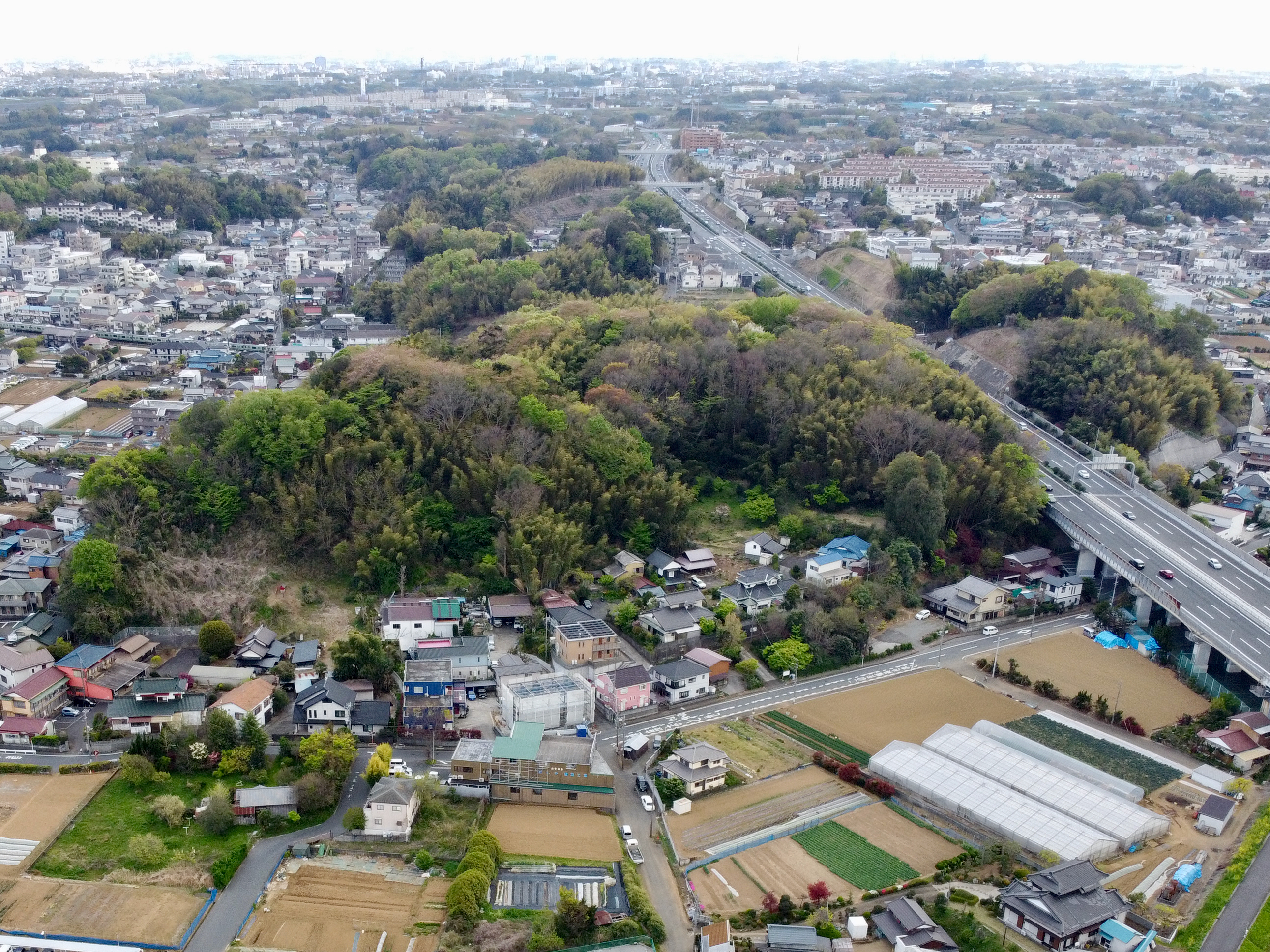
Aerial view of Kozukue Castle
