= Tsunashima Station =

Railway station in Yokohama, Japan

Tsunashima Station 綱島駅

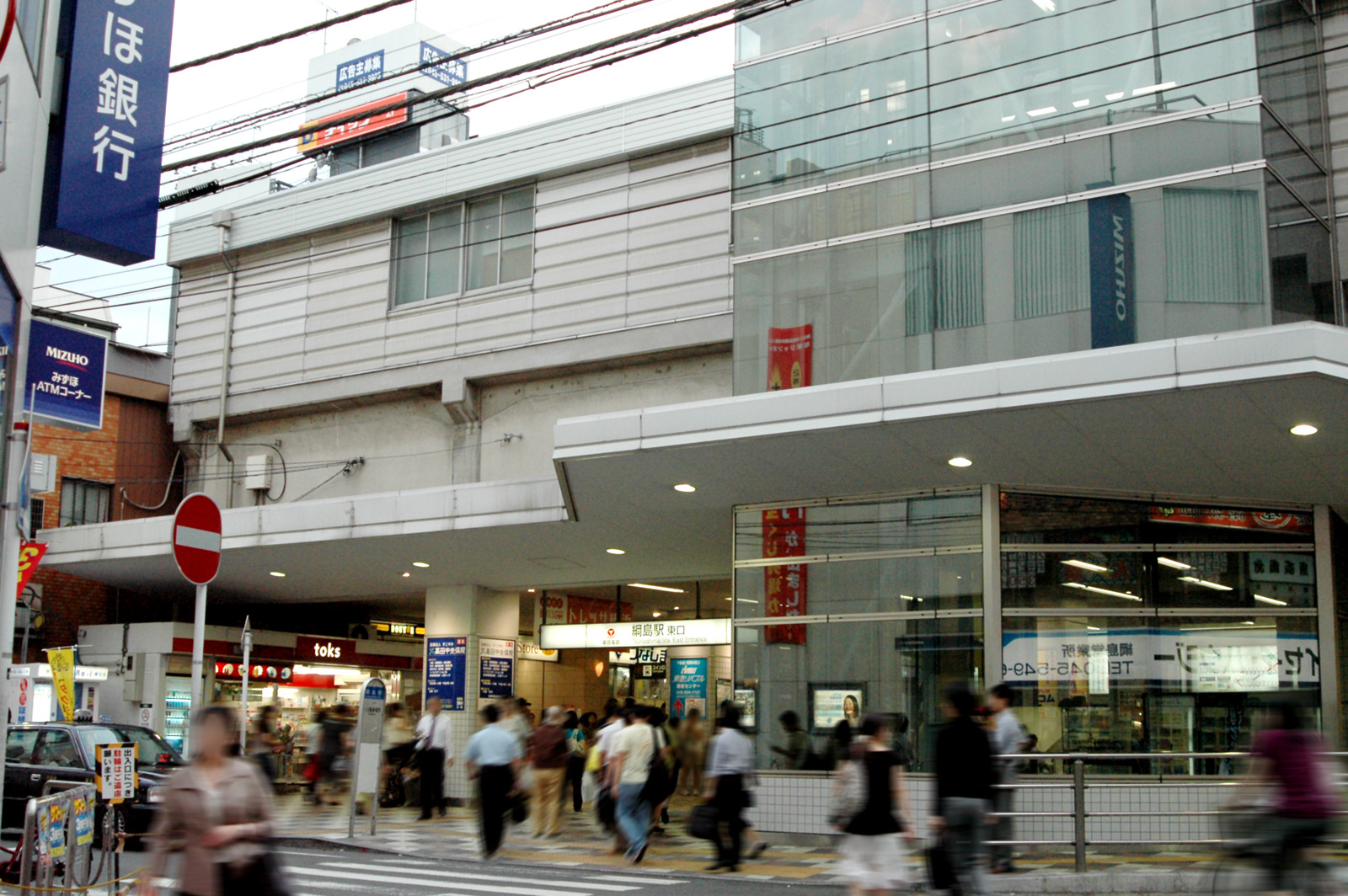
- East Exit of Tsunashima Station

General information
- Location: 1-1-8 Tsunashima, Kōhoku Ward, Yokohama City, Kanagawa Prefecture 223-0053; Japan
- Coordinates: 35°32′12.91″N 139°38′05.32″E
- Operator: Tōkyū Railways
- Line: Tōyoko Line
- Distance: 15.8 km (9.8 mi) from Shibuya
- Platforms: 2 side platforms
- Tracks: 2

Construction
- Structure type: Elevated

Other information
- Station code: TY14
- Website: Official website

History
- Opened: 14 February 1926; 100 years ago
- Former names: Tsunashima-Onsen (until 1944)

Passengers
- FY2019: 103,630 daily

Services
| Preceding station | Tōkyū Railways | Following station |
|---|---|---|
| Kikuna towards Yokohama | Tōyoko Line Express | Hiyoshi towards Shibuya |
| Ōkurayama towards Yokohama | Tōyoko Line Local | Hiyoshi towards Shibuya |
Location
- Location within Special wards of Tokyo Location within Tokyo Bay and Bōsō Peninsula Location within Tokyo Location within Japan

Tsunashima Station (綱島駅, Tsunashima-eki) is a passenger railway station located in Kōhoku-ku, Yokohama, Kanagawa Prefecture, Japan, operated by the private railway company Tokyu Corporation.

== Lines ==
Tsunashima Station is served by the Tōkyū Tōyoko Line from Shibuya in Tokyo to Yokohama in Kanagawa Prefecture. It is 15.8 kilometers from the terminus of the line at Shibuya.

== Station layout ==
The station consists of two elevated opposed side platforms, with the station building and bus terminal underneath.

=== Platforms ===
| 1 | Tōyoko Line | for Kikuna and Yokohama; Minatomirai Line for Motomachi-Chūkagai |
| 2 | Tōyoko Line | for Musashi-Kosugi, Jiyūgaoka, Naka-Meguro, and Shibuya; Tokyo Metro Fukutoshin Line for Ikebukuro, Kotake-mukaihara, and Wakōshi; Seibu Ikebukuro Line for Hannō; Tōbu Tōjō Line for Shinrin-kōen |

== History ==
The station first opened as Tsunashima-Onsen Station (綱島温泉駅) on February 14, 1926. It received its present name on October 20, 1944. The station was rebuilt and tracks were elevated in November 1963 and the station building was refurbished in 2001, with a new North Exit and see-through ticket gates at the main entrance, as well as new escalators and elevators.

== Passenger statistics ==
In fiscal 2019, the station was used by an average of 103,630 passengers daily.

The passenger figures for previous years are as shown below.

| Fiscal year | daily average |
|---|---|
| 2005 | 100,419 |
| 2010 | 96,108 |
| 2015 | 100,459 |

== Surrounding area ==
- Shin-tsunashima Station, very close to this station, but fares are treated separately.
- Tsunashima Onsen
- Tsurumi River
- Otsuna Bridge
- Tsunashima Kofun
- Yokohama City Tsunashima District Center

== See also ==
- List of railway stations in Japan
