= Kikuna Station =

Railway station in Yokohama, Japan

JH15 Kikuna Station 菊名駅

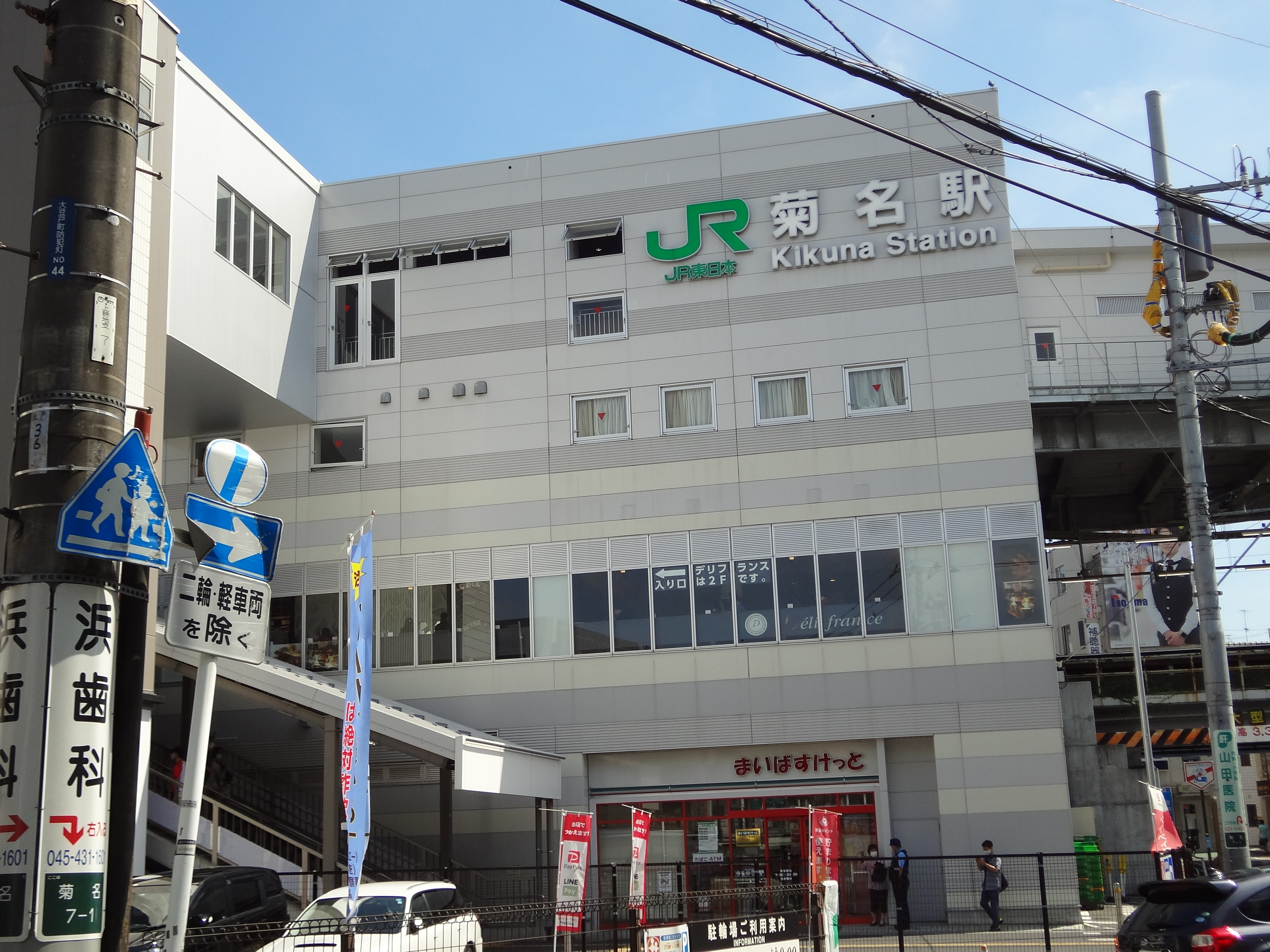
- JR East Kikuna Station building

General information
- Location: Kikuna 7-chome, Kōhoku-ku, Yokohama-shi, Kanagawa-ken 222-0011; Japan
- Coordinates: 35°30′35″N 139°37′53″E
- Operator: JR East; Tōkyū Railways
- Lines: Yokohama Line; Tōyoko Line
- Platforms: 3 island platforms

Other information
- Status: Staffed (Midori no Madoguchi)
- Station code: JH15, TY16

History
- Opened: 14 February 1926; 100 years ago

Passengers
- FY2019 (boarding only): 53,819 daily (JR); 68,768 daily (Tokyu)

Services
| Preceding station | JR East | Following station |
|---|---|---|
| Shin-Yokohama JH16 towards Hachiōji | Yokohama Line Rapid | Higashi-Kanagawa JH13 towards Higashi-Kanagawa or Ōfuna |
| Shin-Yokohama JH16 towards Hachiōji | Yokohama Line Local | Ōguchi JH14 towards Higashi-Kanagawa or Ōfuna |
| Preceding station | Tōkyū Railways | Following station |
| Yokohama towards Motomachi-Chūkagai | F Liner | Musashi-kosugi towards Hannō or Ogawamachi |
| Yokohama Terminus | Tōyoko Line Limited Express | Musashi-kosugi towards Shibuya |
| Yokohama Terminus | Tōyoko Line Commuter Express | Hiyoshi towards Shibuya |
| Yokohama Terminus | Tōyoko Line Express | Tsunashima towards Shibuya |
| Myōrenji towards Yokohama | Tōyoko Line Local | Ōkurayama towards Shibuya |
Location
- Location within Yokohama Location within Kanagawa Prefecture Location within Tokyo Bay and Bōsō Peninsula Location within Japan

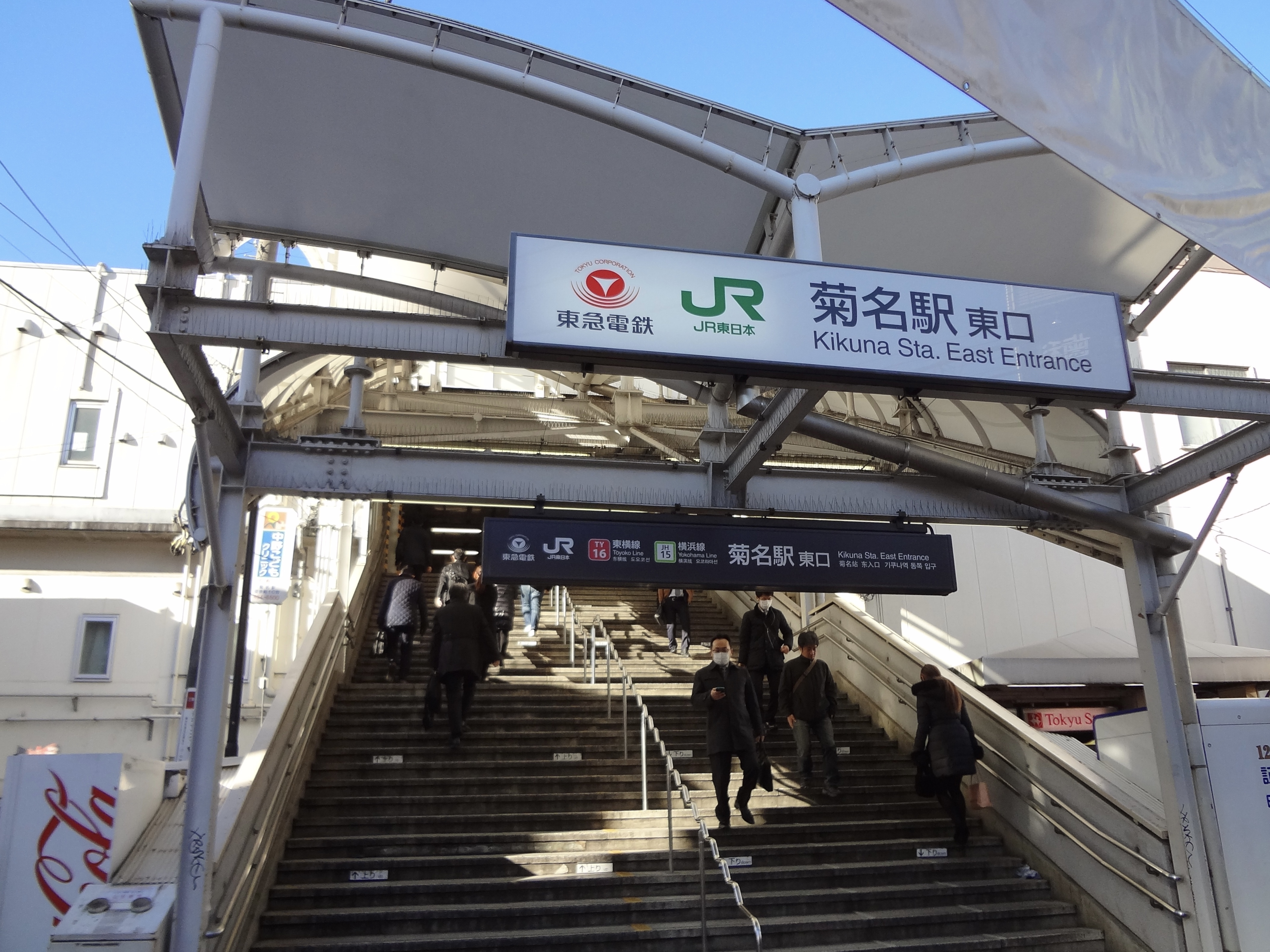
East entrance of Kikuna Station

Kikuna Station (菊名駅, Kikuna-eki) is an interchange commuter railway station located in Kōhoku-ku, Yokohama, Kanagawa Prefecture, Japan. It is operated jointly by the private railway company Tokyu Corporation and by the East Japan Railway Company (JR East).

== Lines ==
Kikuna Station is served by the Tōkyū Tōyoko Line from Shibuya in Tokyo to Yokohama in Kanagawa Prefecture. It is 18.8 kilometers from the terminus of the line at Shibuya. It is also served by the Yokohama Line and is 4.8 kilometers from the terminus of that line at Higashi-Kanagawa.

== Station layout ==
The JR East portion of Kikuna Station has a single island platform serving two elevated tracks, connected to the station building and the Tōkyū Tōyoko Line by an underpass. The station has a Midori no Madoguchi staffed ticket office. Tōkyū Tōyoko Kikuna Station has two island platforms serving four tracks.

=== JR East platforms ===
| 1 | Yokohama Line | for Machida and Hachioji |
| 2 | Yokohama Line | for Higashi-Kanagawa, Sakuragicho, and Ōfuna |

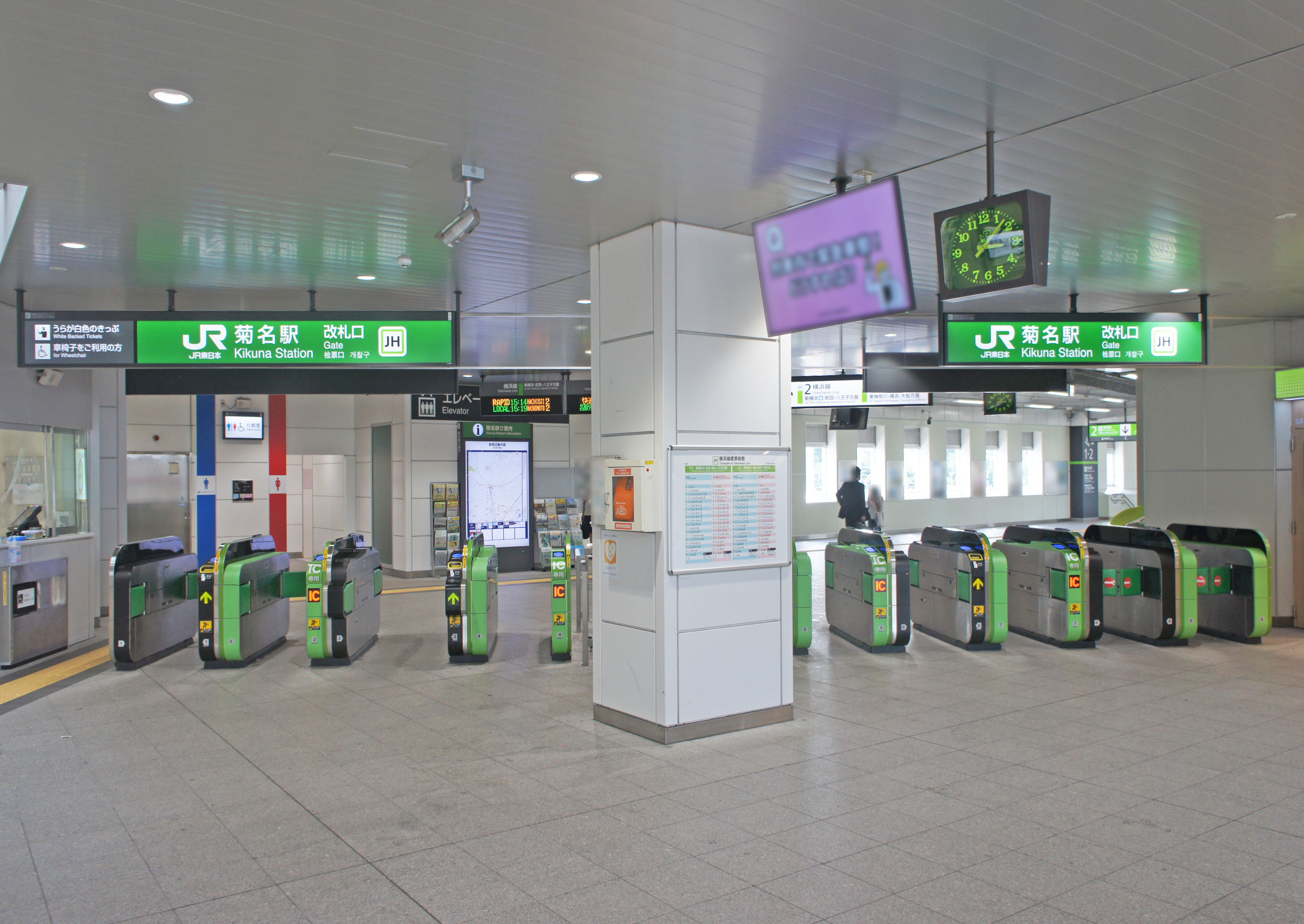
Ticket gates

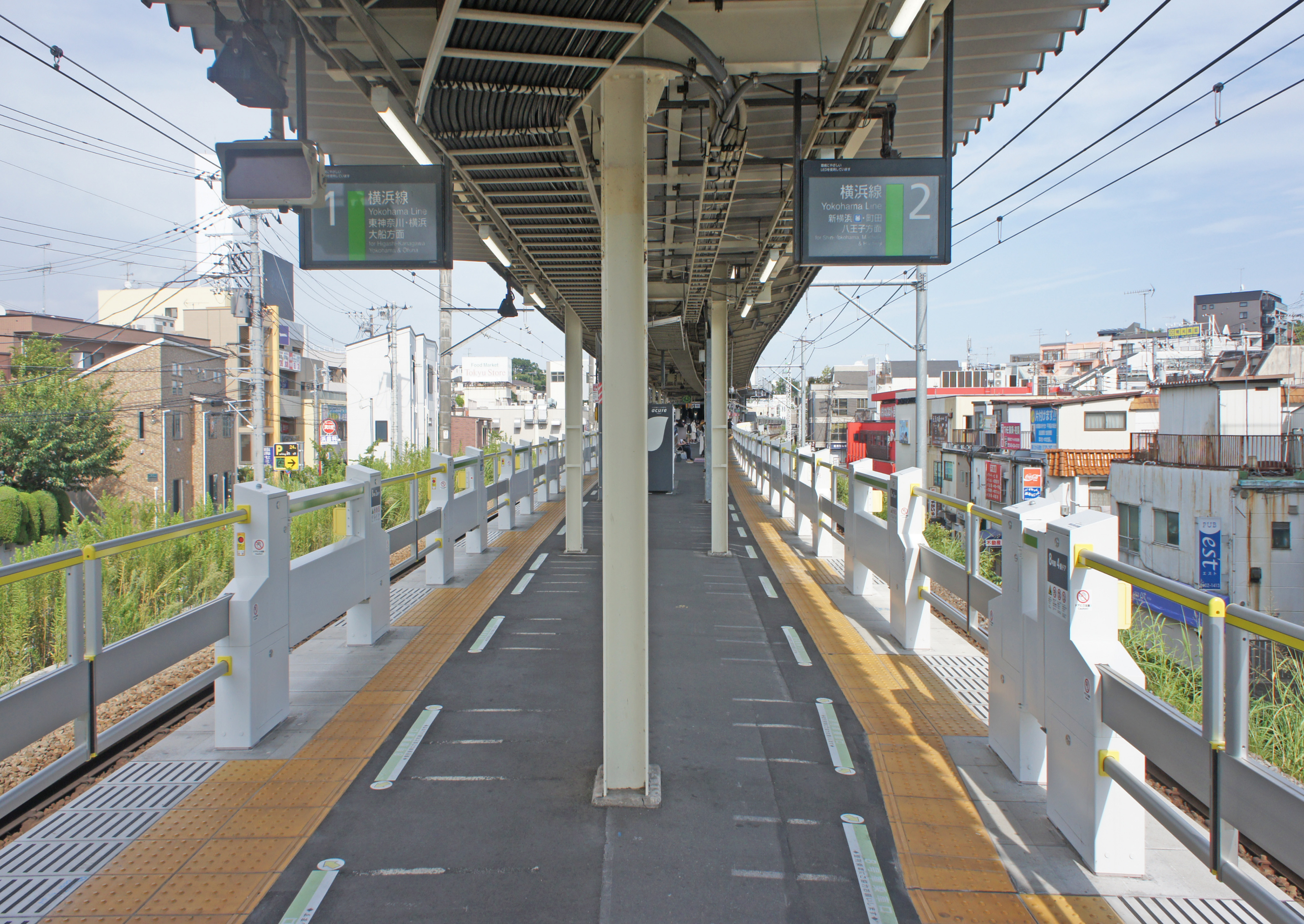
Platforms 1 and 2

=== Tokyu platforms ===
| 3,4 | Tōkyū Tōyoko Line | for Yokohama; Minatomirai Line for Minatomirai, Motomachi-Chūkagai |
| 5,6 | Tōkyū Tōyoko Line | for Musashi-kosugi, Jiyūgaoka, Naka-Meguro and Shibuya; Tokyo Metro Fukutoshin Line for Kotake-Mukaihara and Wakōshi; Seibu Ikebukuro Line for Hanno / Shinrin-Koen |

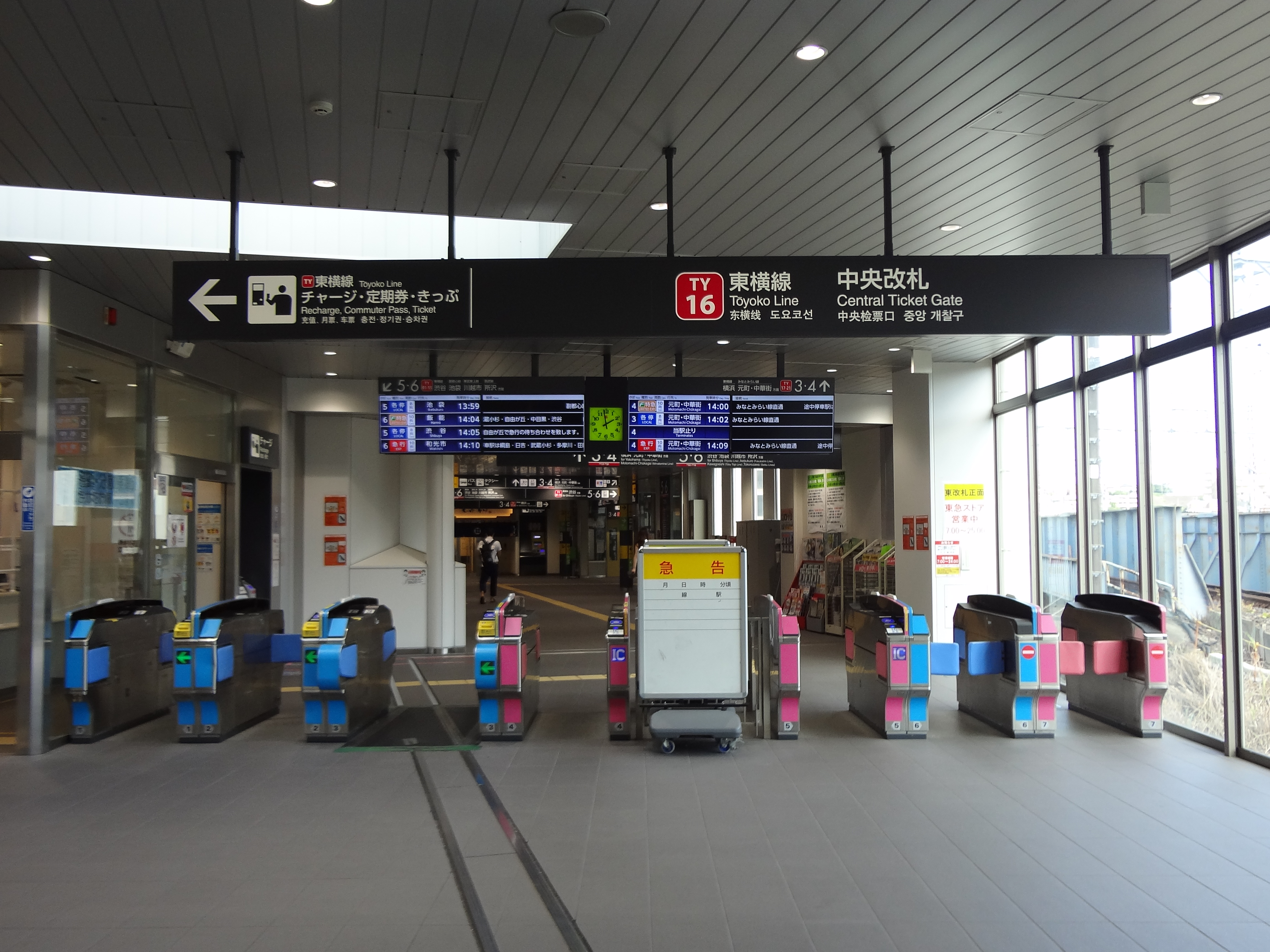
Ticket gates

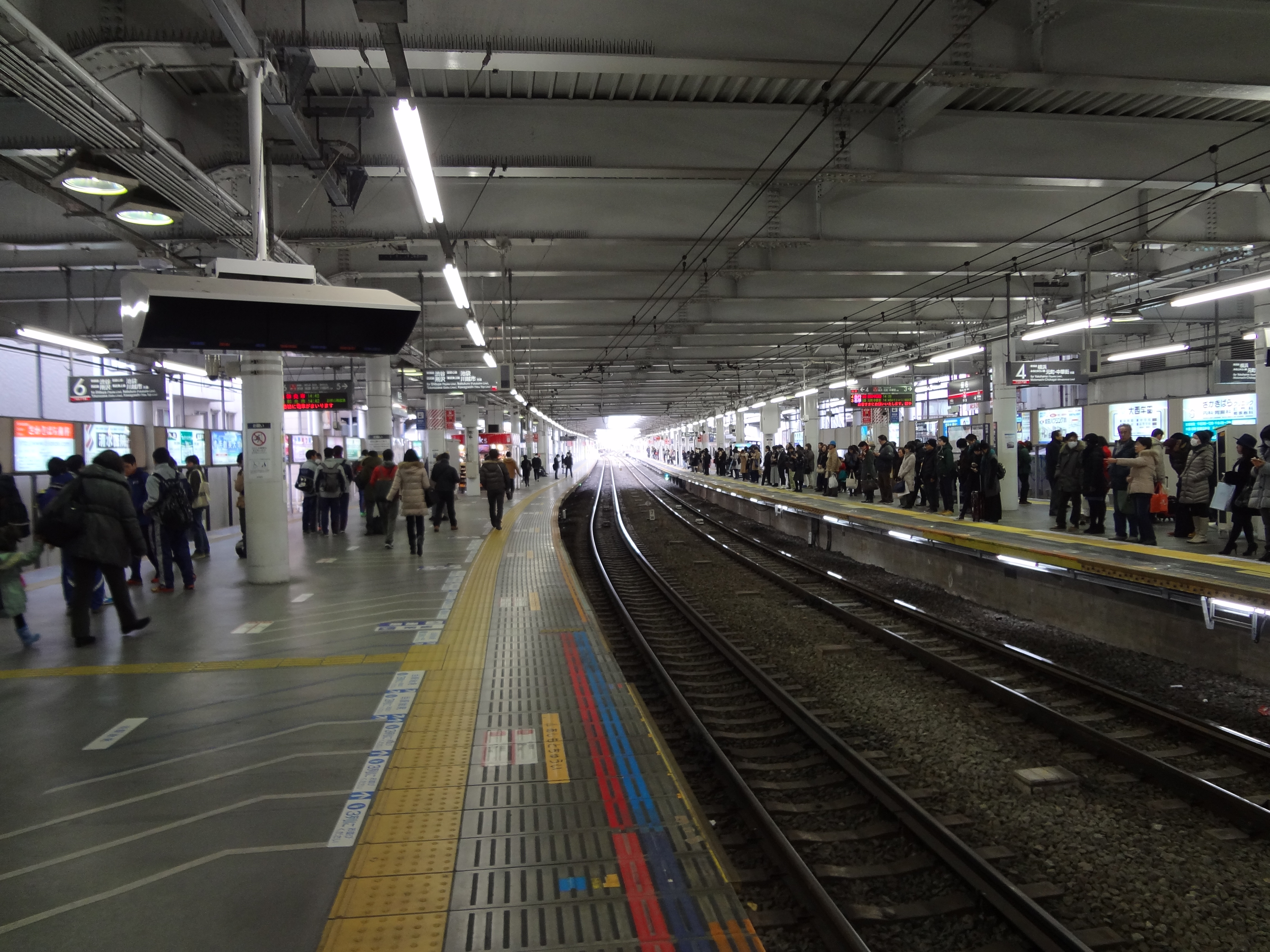
Platforms

== History ==
Kikuna Station was opened on February 14, 1926 as a station on the privately held Tokyo-Yokohama Railway Company (the predecessor to the Tōkyū Tōyoko Line). The Japanese Government Railways (the predecessor to the JNR) began operations to Kikuna on September 1 of the same year. All freight operations were suspended from 1970. In 1972, Tōkyū Tōyoko Line portion of the station was rebuilt, with new elevated tracks and a new station building; however, the tracks remained unused until the Tokyo Metro Hibiya Line connected to the station in 1988 (which was then discontinued on 15 March 2013 when the Daikan-yama to Shibuya section of Tōkyū Tōyoko Line was moved to underground and with through running to Tokyo Metro Fukutoshin Line began). With the privatization of the JNR on April 1, 1987, the JNR portion of the station came under the operational control of JR East. The Tōkyū Tōyoko Line platforms were lengthened in 1991 to accommodate seven-car trains; with through running with Fukutoshin Line, the platforms were lengthened again to accommodate ten-car trains.

Station numbering was introduced to the Yokohama Line platforms 20 August 2016 with Kikuna being assigned station number JH15.

== Passenger statistics ==
In fiscal 2019, the JR portion of the station was used by an average of 53,819 passengers daily (boarding passengers only). During the same period, the Tōkyū portion of the station was used by an average of 136,992 passengers daily (total passengers).

The daily average passenger figures (boarding only) for previous years are as shown below.

| Fiscal year | JR East | Tōkyū |
|---|---|---|
| 2005 | 45,783 | 59,408 |
| 2010 | 50,969 | 66,331 |
| 2015 | 53,228 | 69,249 |

== Surrounding area ==
- Eiri Girls'High School (formerly Takagi Girls' High School)
- Yokohama Municipal Kikuna Elementary School
- Yokohama Municipal Kohoku Library
- Rensho-ji Temple
- Kikuna Shrine
