= Kōhoku-ku =

Kōhoku 港北区
- Ward
- Kōhoku Ward
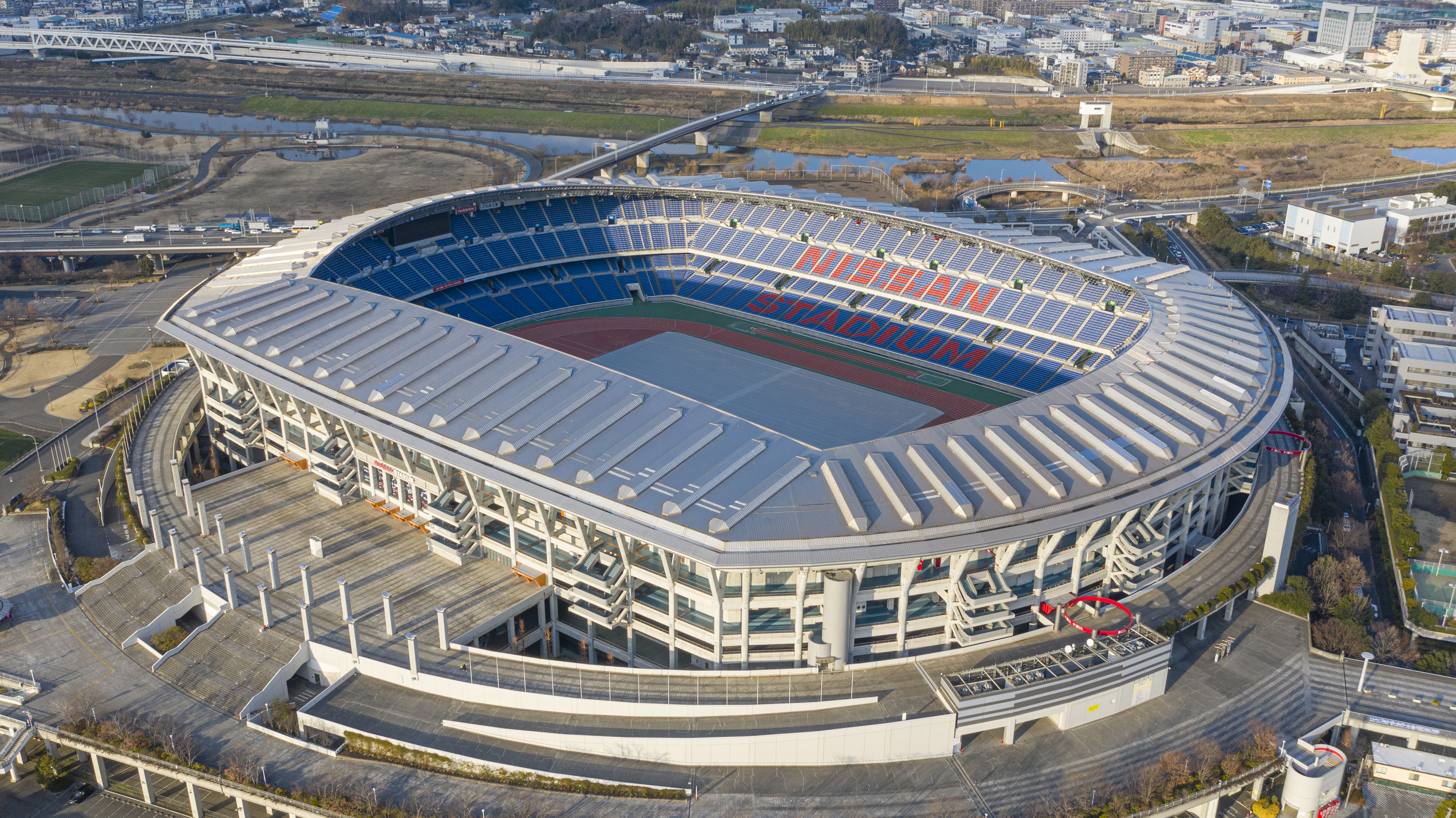
- International Stadium Yokohama

- Emblem

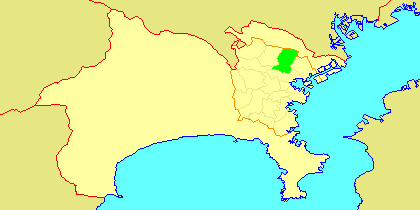

- Location in Japan Kōhoku (Japan)
- Coordinates: 35°31′35″N 139°37′20″E
- Country: Japan
- Region: Kantō
- Prefecture: Kanagawa

Area
  - Total: 31.40 km^{2} (12.12 sq mi)

Population (March 1, 2012)
  - Total: 332,488
  - Density: 10,588.79/km^{2} (27,424.8/sq mi)
- Time zone: UTC+09:00 (JST)
- City hall address: 26-1 Mamedo-chō, Kōhoku-ku, Yokohama; 222-0032
- Website: www.city.yokohama.jp/me/kohoku/en
- Symbols
- Flower: Prunus mume
- Tree: Flowering Dogwood

Kōhoku-ku (港北区) is one of the 18 wards of the city of Yokohama in Kanagawa Prefecture, Japan. As of March 1, 2012, the ward had an estimated population of 332,488, with 156,198 households and a population density of 10,588.79 persons per km^{2}. The total area was 31.40 km^{2}. Kōhoku Ward has the largest population of Yokohama's 18 wards, and ranks second to Naka Ward in the total number of workplaces.

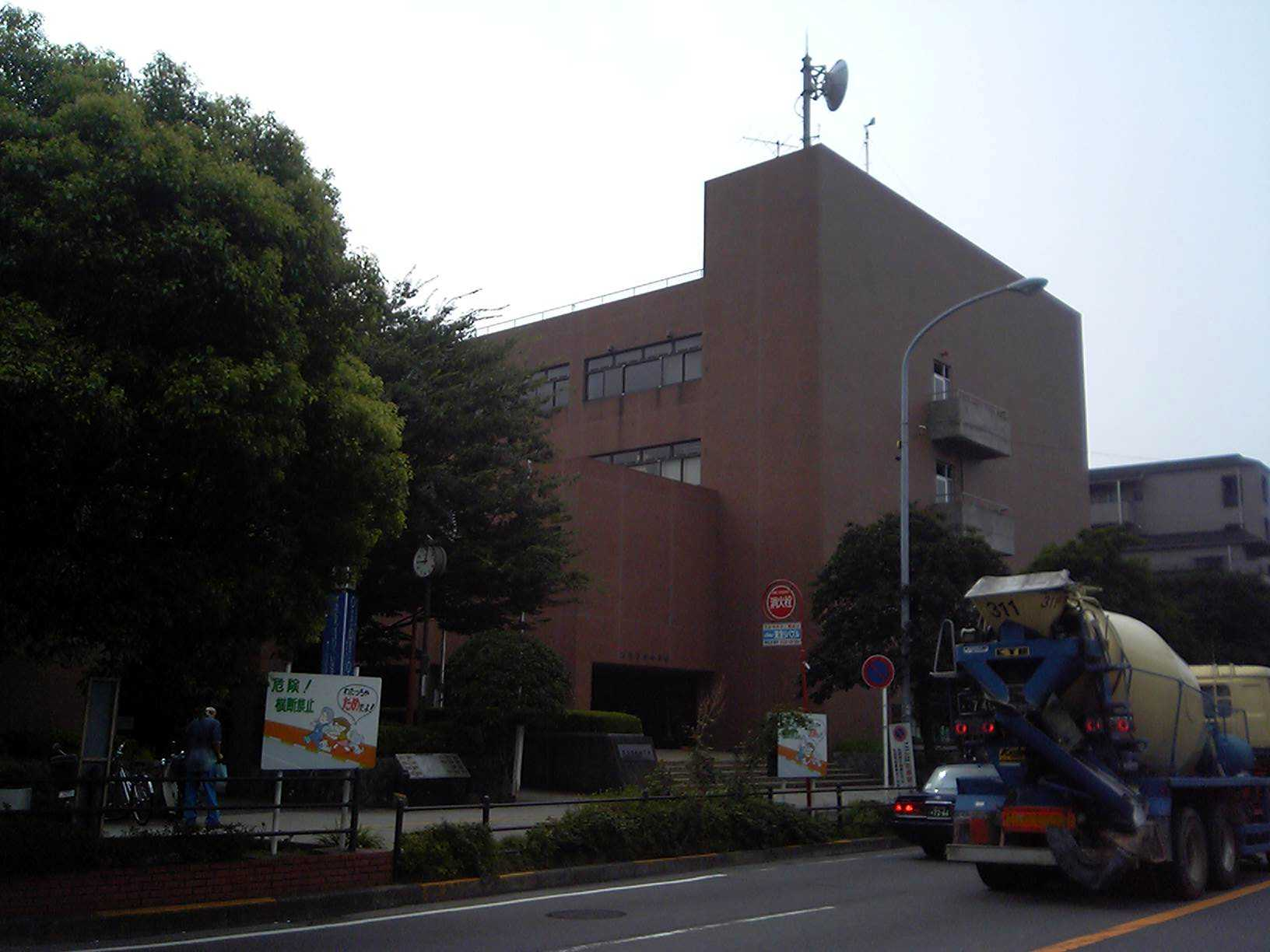
Kōhoku Ward Office

== Geography ==
Kōhoku Ward is located in eastern Kanagawa Prefecture, and on the northeastern borders of the city of Yokohama.

=== Surrounding municipalities ===
- Tsurumi Ward
- Kanagawa Ward
- Midori Ward
- Tsuzuki Ward
- Kawasaki, Kanagawa

== History ==
The area around present-day Kōhoku Ward was formerly part of Tsuzuki District in Musashi Province. During the Edo period, it was a rural region classified as tenryō territory controlled directly by the Tokugawa shogunate, but administered through various hatamoto. After the Meiji Restoration, the area became part of the new Kanagawa Prefecture in 1868. In the cadastral reform of April 1, 1889, the area was divided into numerous villages. In April 1939, it was annexed by the neighboring city of Yokohama.

== Economy ==
Kōhoku Ward is largely a regional commercial center and bedroom community for central Yokohama, Kawasaki and Tokyo.

Companies headquartered in the ward include:

- ANEST IWATA
- Elna Co.

== Local attractions ==
- Shin-Yokohama Ramen Museum
- Nissan Stadium, formerly the International Stadium Yokohama, the stadium in which the 2002 FIFA World Cup Final was held.
- Kozukue Castle, a castle ruin from the Sengoku period, one of the Continued Top 100 Japanese Castles.
- Yokohama Arena

== Education ==
=== Colleges and universities ===
- Keio University (Hiyoshi campus)

=== High schools ===
Kanagawa Prefectural Board of Education operates prefectural high schools:

- Kishine High School
- Kohoku High School
- Nippa High School

Private high schools:

- Keio Senior High School
- Seishin Girls' High School
- Yokohama Eiri Girls' High School

=== Elementary and junior high schools ===
The Yokohama Municipal Board of Education operates municipal elementary and junior high schools.

Municipal junior high schools:

- Hiyoshidai (日吉台)
- Hiyoshidai Nishi (日吉台西)
- Nitta (新田)
- Nippa (新羽)
- Otsuna (大綱)
- Shinohara (篠原)
- Shirosato (城郷)
- Takata (高田)
- Tarumachi (樽町)

Municipal elementary schools:

- Futoo (太尾)
- Hiyoshidai (日吉台)
- Hiyoshiminami (日吉南)
- Kikuna (菊名)
- Kitatsunashima (北綱島)
- Kohoku (港北)
- Komabayashi (駒林)
- Kozukue (小机)
- Mamedo (大豆戸)
- Minowa (箕輪)
- Morooka (師岡)
- Nitta (新田)
- Nippa (新羽)
- Osone (大曽根)
- Otsuna (大綱)
- Shimoda (下田)
- Shinohara (篠原)
- Shinohara Nishi (篠原西)
- Shin Yoshida (新吉田)
- Shin Yoshida Daini (No. 2) (新吉田第二)
- Shirosato (城郷)
- Takata (高田)
- Takata Higashi (高田東)
- Tsunashima (綱島)
- Tsunashima Higashi (綱島東)
- Yagami (矢上)

Additionally, the zones of Higashi Hongo Elementary School (東本郷小学校), Kamihashi Elementary School (神橋小学校) and Shirahata Elementary School (白幡小学校), not in Kohoku-ku, include portions of Kohoku-ku.

== Transportation ==
=== Rail ===
- JR Central – Tōkaidō Shinkansen
  - Shin-Yokohama
- JR East – Yokohama Line
  - Kikuna – Shin-Yokohama – Kozukue
- Yokohama City Transportation Bureau – Blue Line
  - Kita Shin-Yokohama –Shin-Yokohama –Kishine-kōen –Nippa
- Yokohama City Transportation Bureau – Green Line
  - Takata – Hiyoshi-Honchō – Hiyoshi
- Tokyu Corporation – Tōkyū Tōyoko Line
  - Hiyoshi – Tsunashima – Ōkurayama – Kikuna – Myōrenji
- Tokyu Corporation – Tōkyū Meguro Line
  - Hiyoshi

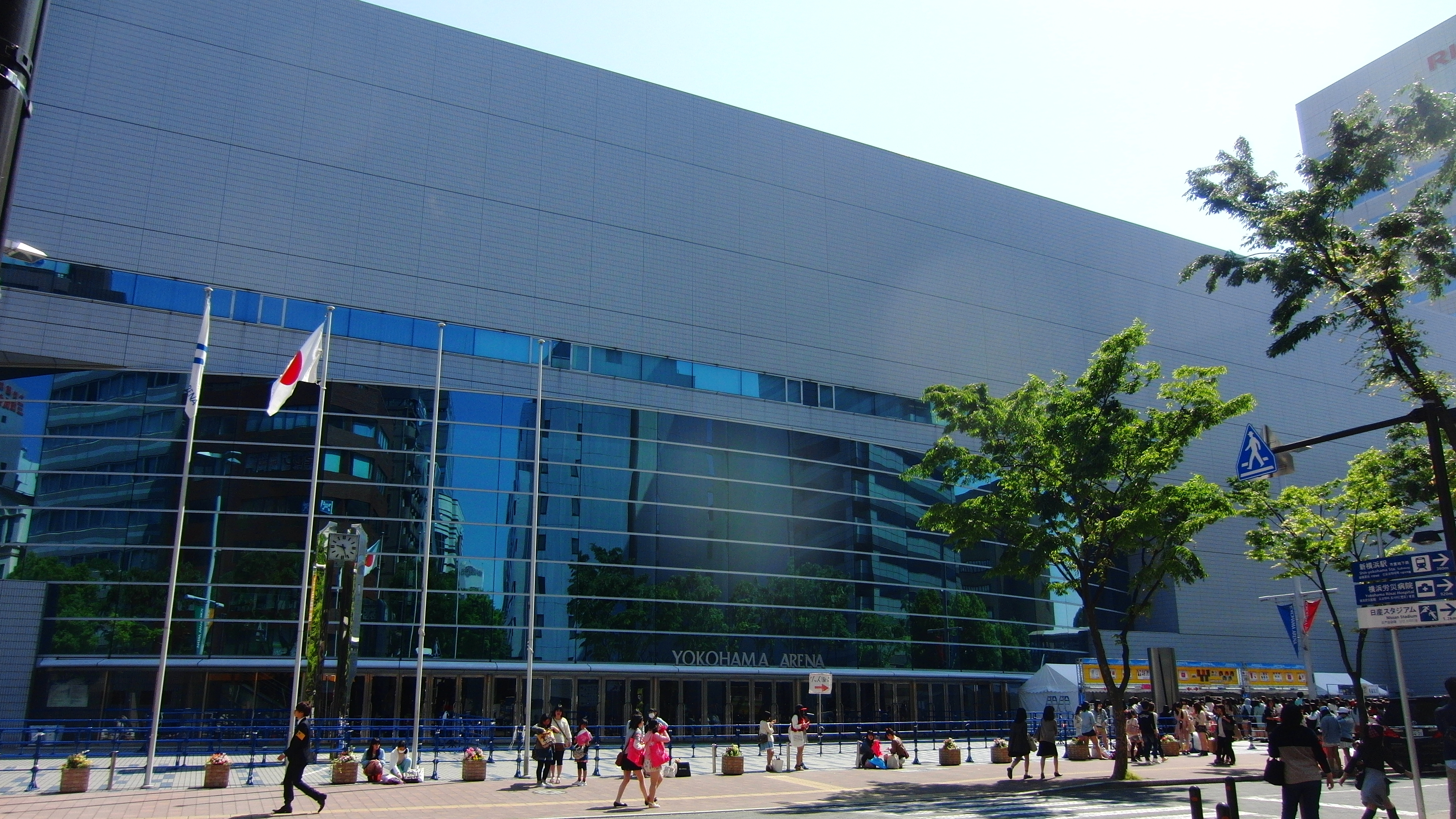
Yokohama Arena

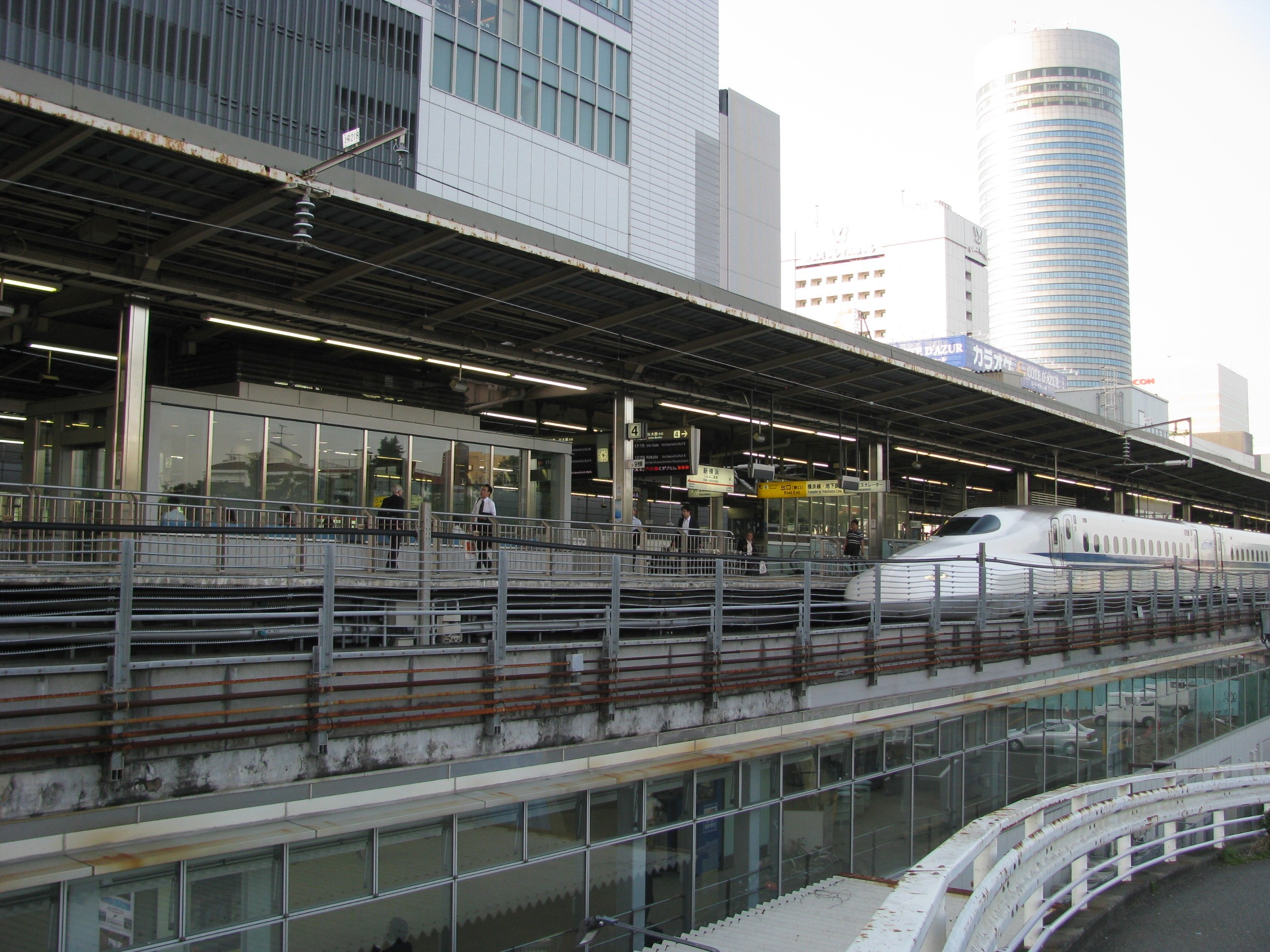
Shin Yokohama Station

=== Highways ===
- National Route 466

=== Airport access ===
An airport limousine bus service operates between Shin-Yokohama Prince Hotel and Shin-Yokohama Station and Narita Airport.

== Notable people from Kōhoku Ward ==
- Masayuki Okano, professional soccer player
- Ryo Fukawa, actor
- Naoko Iijima, actress
- Takako Tokiwa, actress
- Daisuke Tonoike, professional soccer player
- Salyu, singer
- Shōsuke Tanihara, actor
