= Takashimadaira Station =

Metro station in Tokyo, Japan

Coordinates: 35.7890°N 139.6611°E

Takashimadaira Station 高島平駅

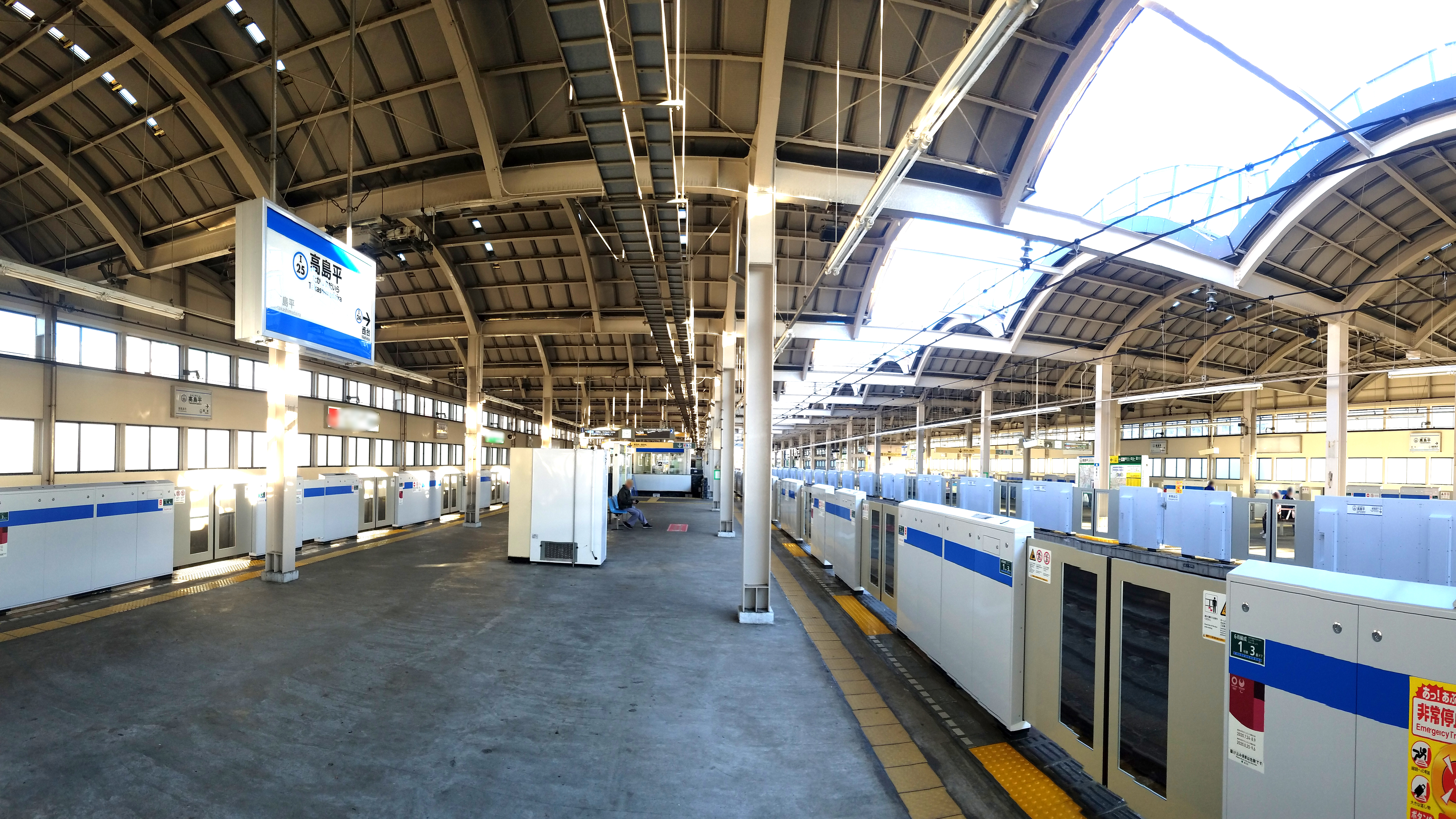
- Platform level of Takashimadaira Station.

General information
- Location: 8-2-1 Takashimadaira, Itabashi City, Tokyo; Japan
- Operator: Toei Subway
- Line: Mita Line
- Platforms: 2 island platforms
- Tracks: 4

Construction
- Structure type: Elevated
- Accessible: Yes

Other information
- Station code: I-25

History
- Opened: 27 December 1968; 57 years ago

Services
Preceding station	Toei Subway	Following station
Shin-takashimadaira towards Nishi-takashimadaira	Mita Line	Nishidai towards Meguro
Location
- Location within Special wards of Tokyo Location within Tokyo Bay and Bōsō Peninsula Location within Tokyo Location within Japan

Takashimadaira Station (高島平駅, Takashimadaira-eki) is a railway station on the Toei Mita Line in Itabashi, Tokyo, Japan, operated by the Tokyo subway operator Tokyo Metropolitan Bureau of Transportation (Toei).

== Lines ==
Takashimadaira Station is served by the Toei Mita Line, and is numbered "I-25".

== Station layout ==
The station is composed of two island platforms serving four tracks. The Mita line sidings are next to the station.

=== Platforms ===
1-2
3-4
Mita Line
Mita Line
- for Sugamo, Ōtemachi, and Meguro
- Meguro Line for Musashi-Kosugi and Hiyoshi
- Sotetsu Main Line for Ebina via the Tokyu/Sotetsu Shin-Yokohama Line
- Sotetsu Izumino Line for Shōnandai via the Tokyu/Sotetsu Shin-Yokohama Line
for Nishi-takashimadaira

== History ==
The station opened on 27 December 1968 as Shimura Station (志村駅).

It was renamed on 1 August 1969 to its current name.

== See also ==
- List of railway stations in Japan
