= Hibiya Station =

Metro station in Tokyo, Japan

Coordinates: 35.674947°N 139.759623°E

Hibiya Station 日比谷駅

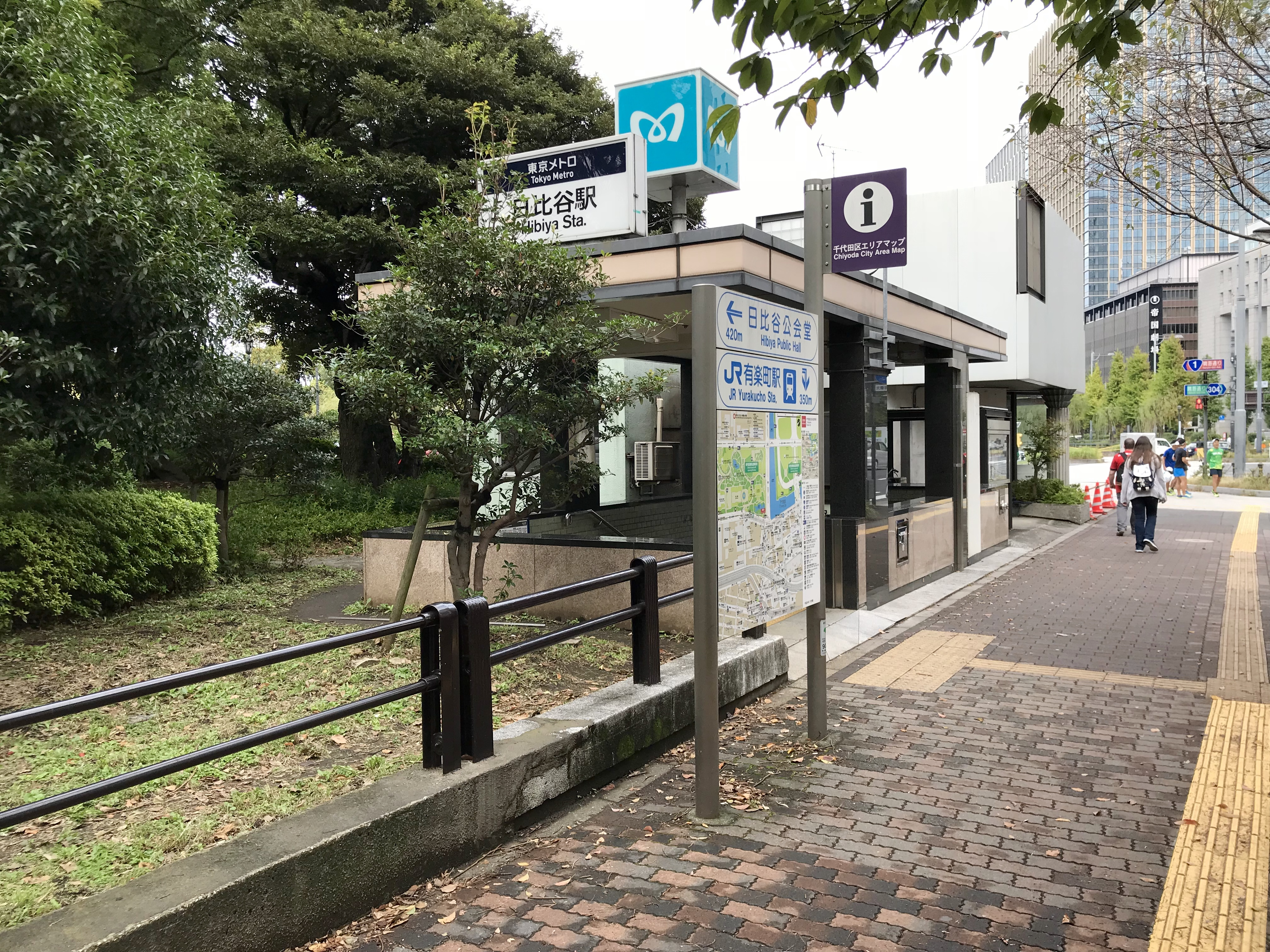
- Exit A10

General information
- Location: 1-5-1-saki (Tokyo Metro); 1-13-1-saki (Toei); Yūrakuchō, Chiyoda City, Tokyo; Japan
- Operator: Tokyo Metro; Toei Subway
- Lines: Chiyoda Line; Hibiya Line; Mita Line
- Platforms: 2 side platforms, 1 island platform
- Connections: JK25 JY30 Yūrakuchō

Construction
- Structure type: Underground

Other information
- Station code: C-09, H-08, I-08

History
- Opened: 29 August 1964; 62 years ago

Passengers
- FY2019: 116,808 daily (Tokyo Metro); 95,622 daily (Toei Subway)

Services
Preceding station	Tokyo Metro	Following station
Kasumigaseki towards Yoyogi-Uehara	Chiyoda Line	Nijubashimae towards Kita-Ayase
Kasumigaseki towards Naka-meguro	Hibiya Line	Ginza towards Kita-Senju
Preceding station	Toei Subway	Following station
Uchisaiwaicho towards Meguro	Mita Line	Ōtemachi towards Nishi-Takashimadaira
Location
- Location within Tokyo Yamanote Loop Location within Tokyo wards area Location within Japan

Hibiya Station (日比谷駅, Hibiya-eki) is a Tokyo subway station in the Yūrakuchō district of Chiyoda, Tokyo, Japan, operated by Tokyo Metro and Toei. The area around the station is generally called Hibiya, which is the southwestern corner of the Yūrakuchō district.

Hibiya is Tokyo Metro's 33rd busiest station in fiscal 2019, while its connected station Yūrakuchō ranks sixteenth.

== Lines ==
- Tokyo Metro Chiyoda Line (C-09)
- Tokyo Metro Hibiya Line (H-08)
- Toei Mita Line (I-08)

Yūrakuchō Station on the Tokyo Metro Yūrakuchō Line is connected to Hibiya Station by underground passageways, and it is possible to connect between the two stations without going through the ticket gates. However, the JR platforms at Yūrakuchō are fairly far from Hibiya Station and require a second ticket.

== Station layout ==
=== Tokyo Metro platforms ===
1	Hibiya Line	for Ebisu and Naka-meguro
2	Hibiya Line	for Ginza, Ueno, and Kita-senju; Tobu Skytree Line for Tōbu-Dōbutsu-Kōen; Tobu Nikko Line for Minami-Kurihashi
3	Chiyoda Line	for Omote-sando and Yoyogi-uehara; Odakyu Odawara Line for Hon-Atsugi and Isehara
4	Chiyoda Line	for Otemachi, Kita-senju, Ayase, and Kita-ayase; Jōban Line (Local) for Abiko and Toride

=== Toei platforms ===
1
2
Mita Line
Mita Line
- for Shirokane-takanawa and Meguro
- Meguro Line for Musashi-Kosugi and Hiyoshi
- Sotetsu Main Line for Ebina via the Tokyu/Sotetsu Shin-Yokohama Line
- Sotetsu Izumino Line for Shōnandai via the Tokyu/Sotetsu Shin-Yokohama Line
for Otemachi, Sugamo, and Nishi-takashimadaira

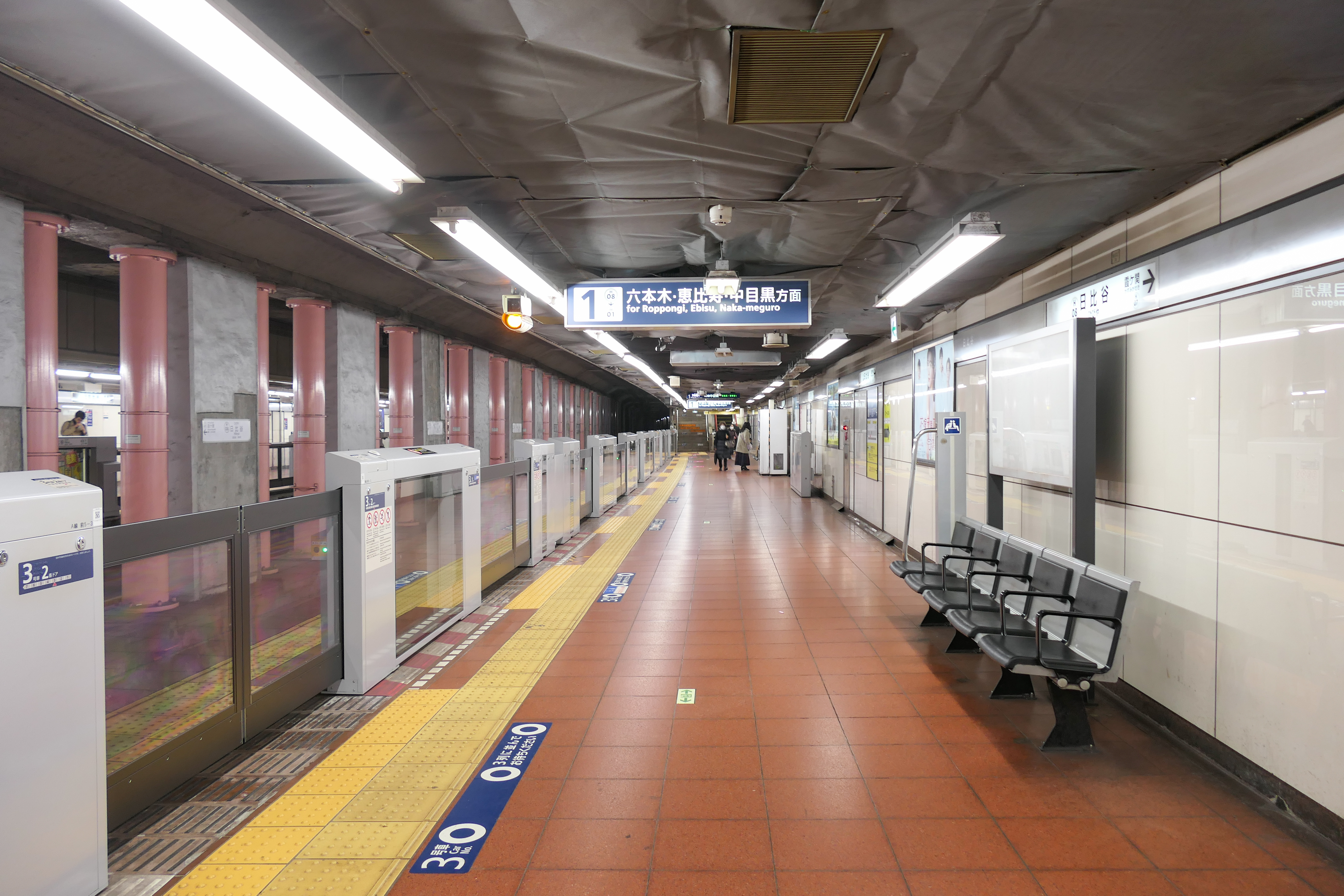
Hibiya Line platforms, 2023

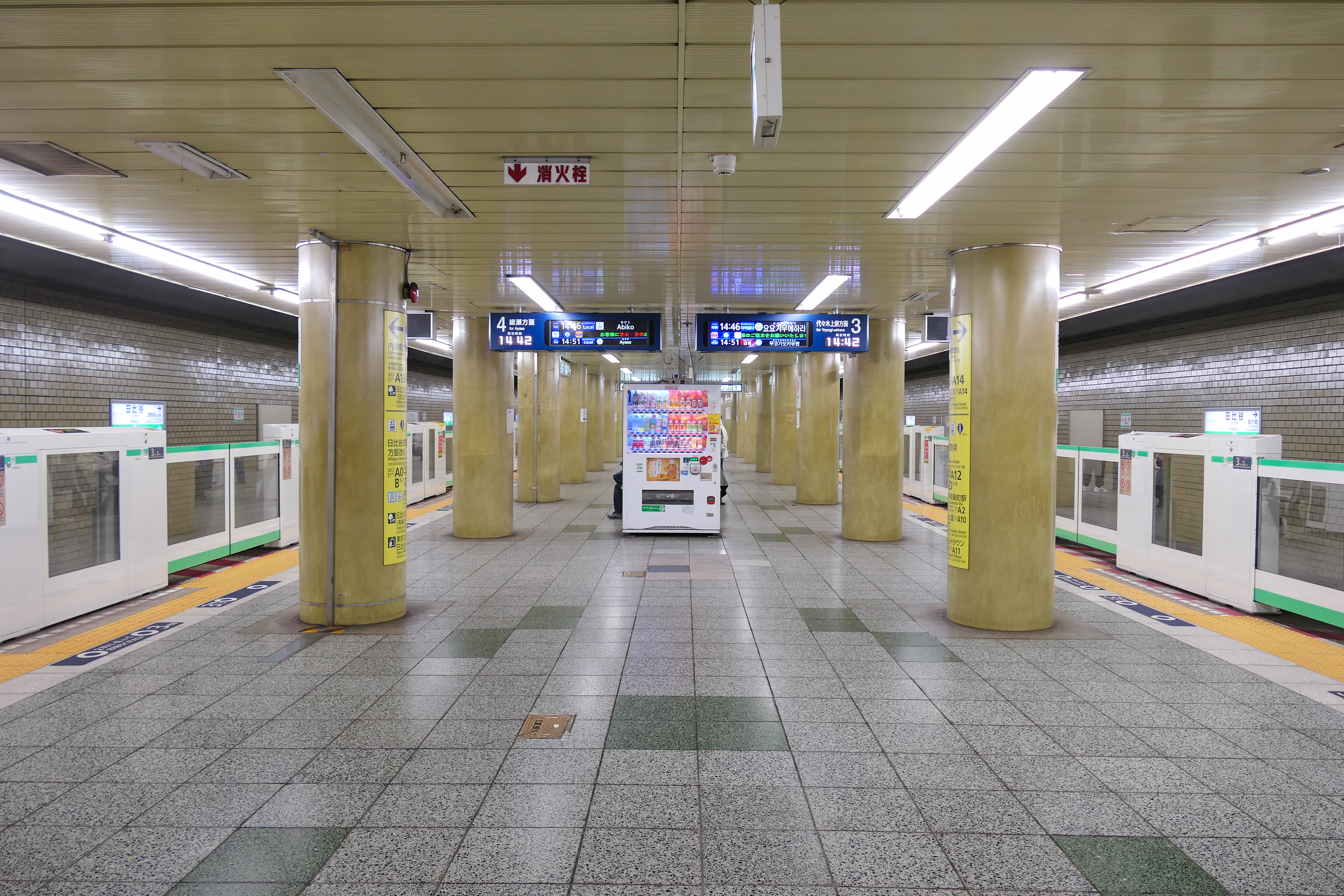
Chiyoda Line platforms, 2023

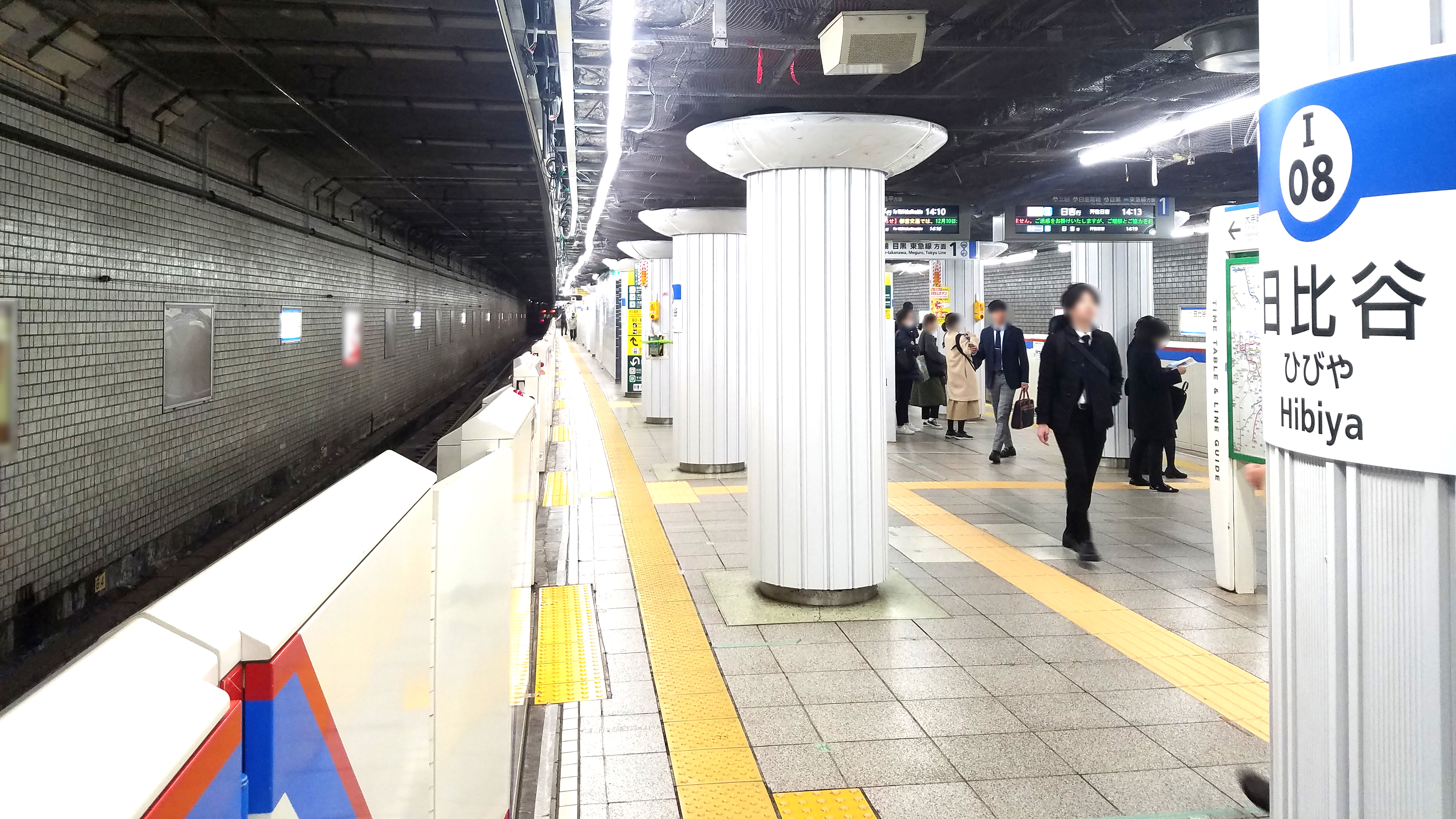
Mita Line platforms, 2019

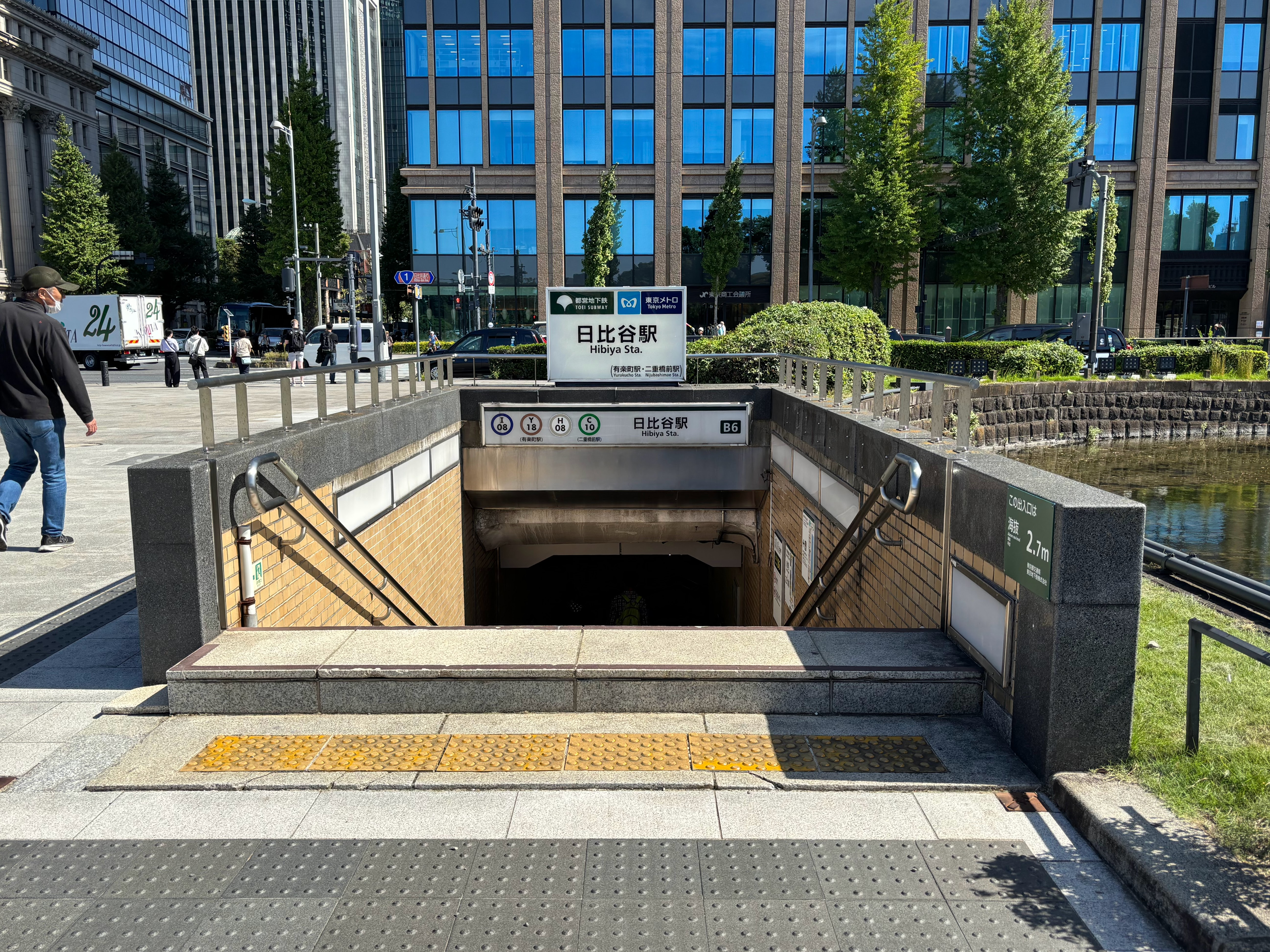
Entrance B6, in Marunouchi district.

== History ==
The Hibiya Line station was opened on 29 August 1964, the Chiyoda Line station was opened on 20 March 1971, and the Mita Line station was opened on 30 June 1972 by the Teito Rapid Transit Authority (TRTA).

The station facilities of the Hibiya and Chiyoda Lines were inherited by Tokyo Metro after the privatization of the TRTA in 2004.

As of 3 November 2026, the departure melody for the Tokyo Metro platforms has been Akira Ifukube's theme song for Godzilla, in honor of the Toho company whose headquarters are located nearby.

== Surrounding area ==
- Yūrakuchō Station (on the Tokyo Metro Yūrakuchō Line; connected via underground passages)
- Hibiya, Yūrakuchō and Ginza area
- Tokyo Imperial Palace
- Hibiya Park
  - The Chiyoda City Hibiya Library
- Tokyo Takarazuka Theater
- Imperial Hotel, Tokyo
- The Peninsula Tokyo
