= Itabashihoncho Station =

Metro station in Tokyo, Japan

Coordinates: 35.7614°N 139.7053°E

Itabashihoncho Station 板橋本町駅

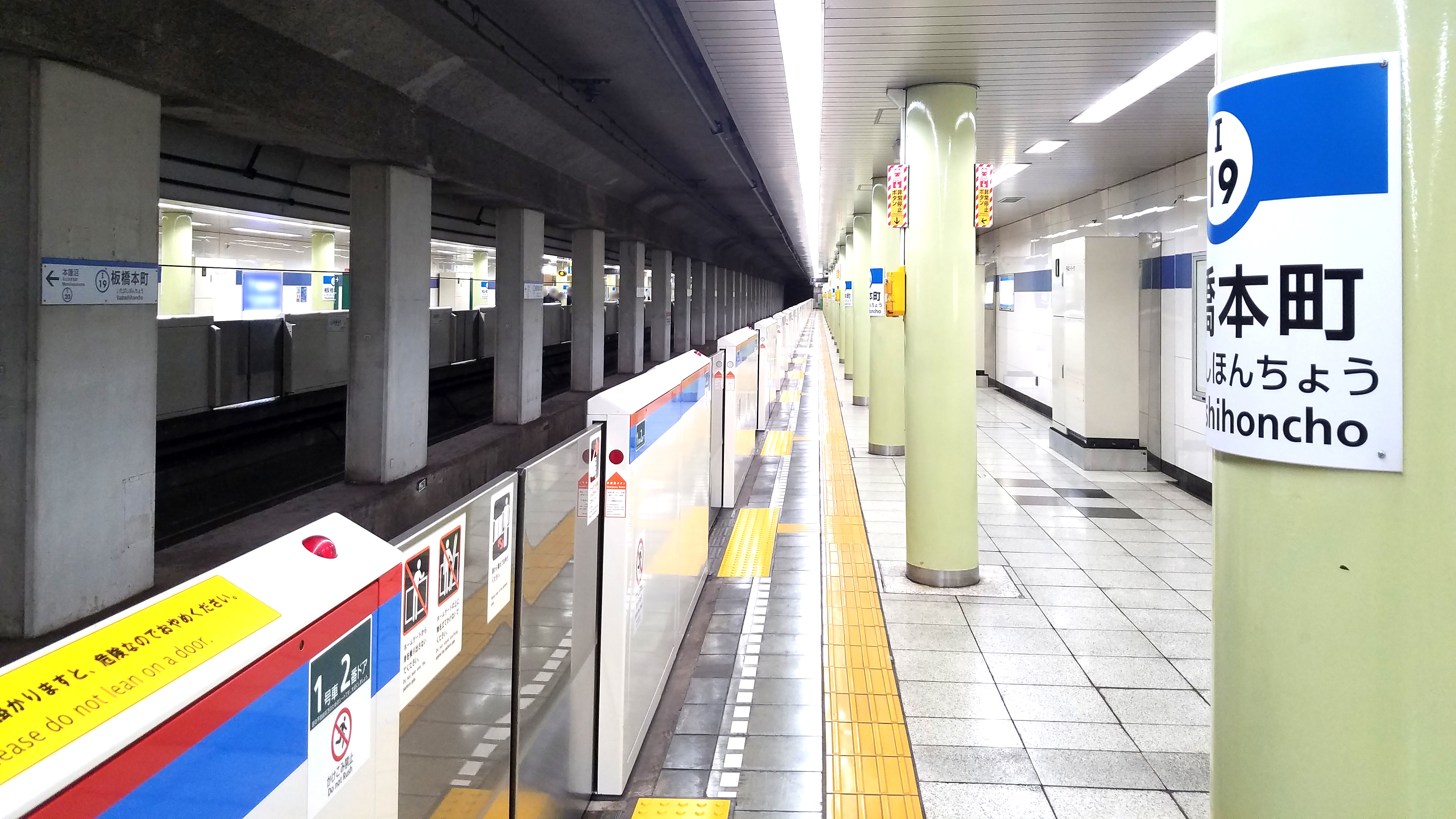
- Platform level of Itabashihoncho Station.

General information
- Location: 17-1 Yamatocho, Itabashi, Tokyo; Japan
- Operator: Toei Subway
- Line: Mita Line
- Platforms: 2 side platforms
- Tracks: 2

Construction
- Structure type: Underground
- Accessible: Yes

Other information
- Station code: I-19

History
- Opened: 27 December 1968; 57 years ago

Services
Preceding station	Toei Subway	Following station
Motohasunuma towards Nishi-takashimadaira	Mita Line	Itabashikuyakushomae towards Meguro
Location
- Location within Special wards of Tokyo Location within Tokyo Bay and Bōsō Peninsula Location within Tokyo Location within Japan

Itabashihoncho Station (板橋本町駅, Itabashi-honchō-eki) is a subway station on the Toei Mita Line in Itabashi, Tokyo, Japan, operated by Toei Subway.

It is located in the northern part of Tokyo, under the intersection of Nakasendo and Kannana-dori.

== Platforms ==
The station consists of two side platforms.

1
2
Mita Line
Mita Line
- for Sugamo, Ōtemachi, and Meguro
- Meguro Line for Musashi-Kosugi and Hiyoshi
- Sotetsu Main Line for Ebina via the Tokyu/Sotetsu Shin-Yokohama Line
- Sotetsu Izumino Line for Shōnandai via the Tokyu/Sotetsu Shin-Yokohama Line
for Nishi-Takashimadaira

== History ==
The station opened on 27 December 1968.
