= Shin-itabashi Station =

Metro station in Itabashi, Tokyo, Japan

Coordinates: 35.7488°N 139.7196°E

Shin-itabashi Station 新板橋駅

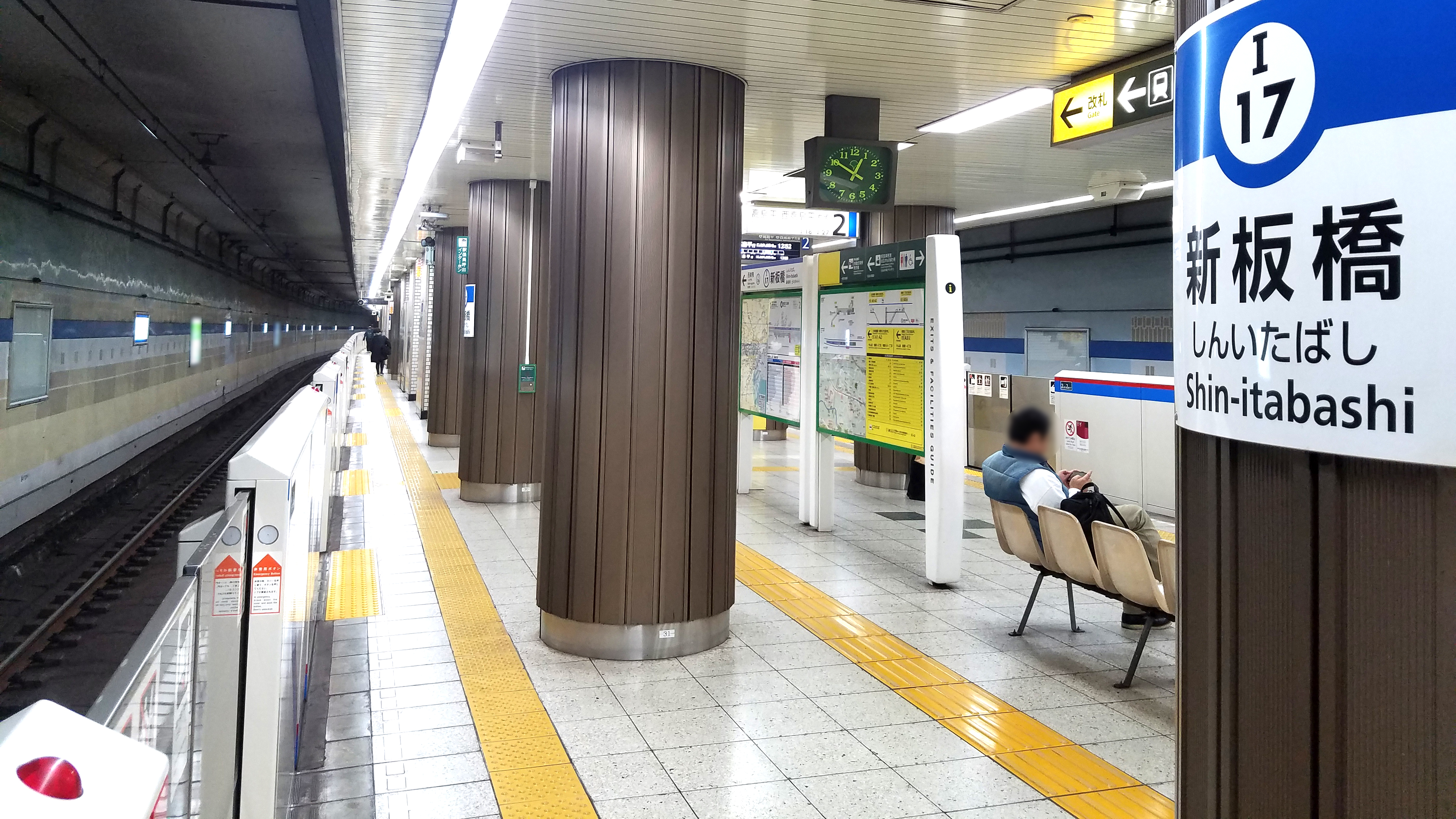
- Platforms

General information
- Location: 1 Chome-53-17 Itabashi, Itabashi City, Tokyo; Japan
- Operator: Toei Subway
- Line: Mita Line
- Platforms: 1 island platform
- Tracks: 2

Construction
- Structure type: Underground
- Accessible: Yes

Other information
- Station code: I-17

History
- Opened: 27 December 1968; 57 years ago

Passengers
- 2015: 28,697 daily

Services
Preceding station	Toei Subway	Following station
Itabashikuyakushomae towards Nishi-takashimadaira	Mita Line	Nishi-Sugamo towards Meguro
Location
- Location within Special wards of Tokyo Location within Tokyo Bay and Bōsō Peninsula Location within Tokyo Location within Japan

Shin-itabashi Station (新板橋駅, Shin-itabashi eki) is a metro station on the Toei Mita Line in Itabashi, Tokyo, Japan, operated by Toei Subway.

== Lines ==
Shin-itabashi Station is served by the Toei Mita Line, and is numbered I-17. Located between Nishi-sugamo and Itabashi-kuyakushomae, it is 17.0 km (10.6 mi) from the starting point of the Mita Line at Meguro.

== Station layout ==
The station consists of an island platform serving two tracks.

=== Platforms ===
1
2
Mita Line
Mita Line
- for Sugamo, Ōtemachi, and Meguro
- Meguro Line for Musashi-Kosugi and Hiyoshi
- Sotetsu Main Line for Ebina via the Tokyu/Sotetsu Shin-Yokohama Line
- Sotetsu Izumino Line for Shōnandai via the Tokyu/Sotetsu Shin-Yokohama Line
for Nishi-takashimadaira

== History ==
Shin-itabashi Station opened on 27 December 1968.

== Surrounding area ==
- Itabashi Station

The station is close to Itabashi Station on the JR Saikyō Line. It takes about 5 minutes from here to the station.

- Shimo-Itabashi Station

Moreover, the station is also near to Shimo-Itabashi Station on the Tobu Tojo Line. It takes about 7 minutes from here to the station.

- Lycée Français International de Tokyo

The French international school relocated to Takinogawa from Fujimi in 2012.
