= Itabashikuyakushomae Station =

Metro station in Tokyo, Japan

Itabashikuyakushomae Station 板橋区役所前駅

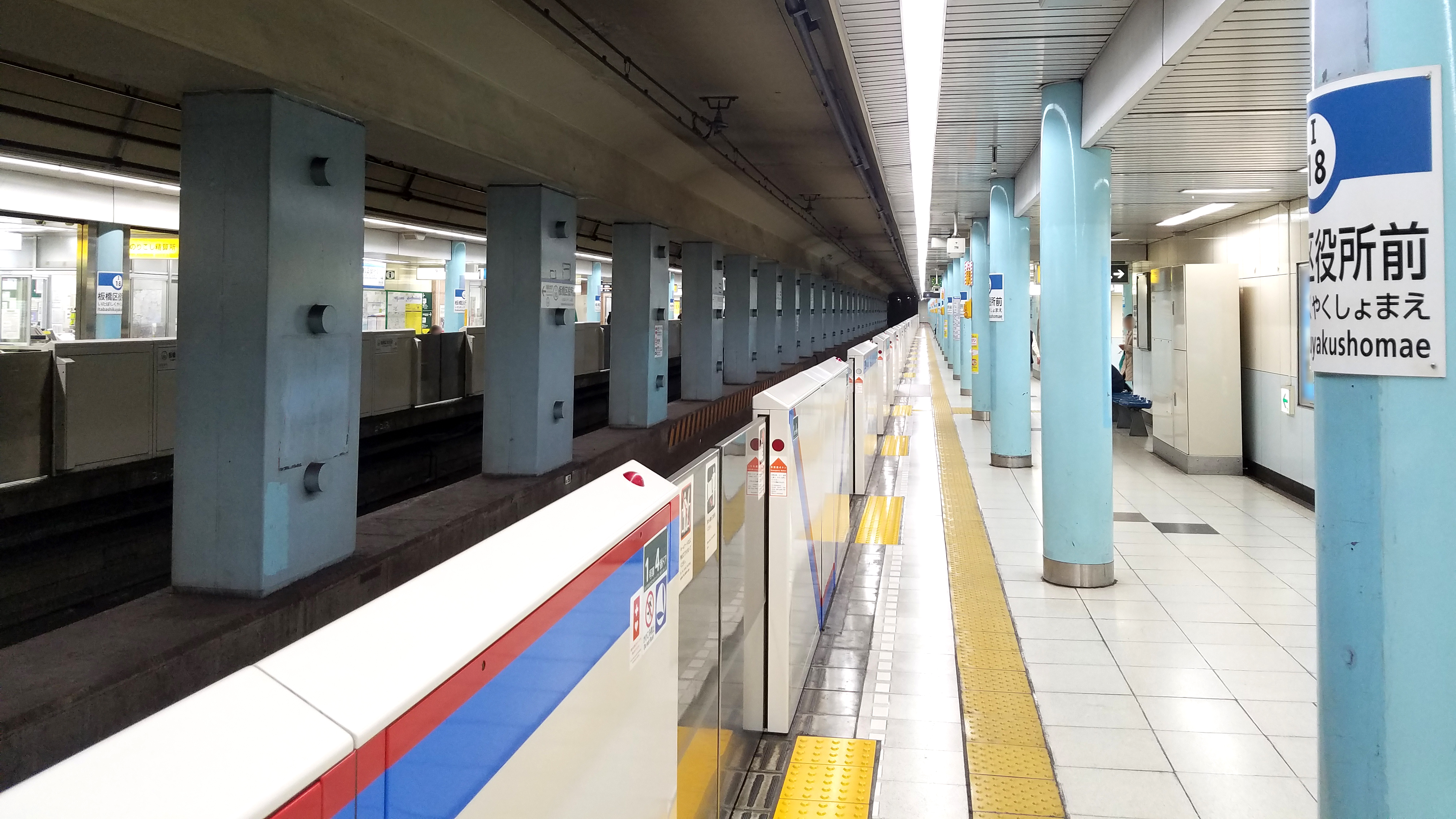
- Platform level of Itabashikuyakushomae Station.

Japanese name
- Shinjitai: 板橋区役所前駅
- Kyūjitai: 板橋區役所前驛
- Hiragana: いたばしくやくしょまええき

General information
- Location: 2-66-17 Itabashi, Itabashi City, Tokyo; Japan
- Coordinates: 35.7513°N 139.7102°E
- Operator: Toei Subway
- Line: Mita Line
- Platforms: 2 side platforms
- Tracks: 2

Construction
- Structure type: Underground
- Accessible: Yes

Other information
- Station code: I-18
- Website: Official website

History
- Opened: 27 December 1968; 57 years ago

Passengers
- FY2016: 16,887 daily

Services
| Preceding station | Toei Subway | Following station |
|---|---|---|
| Itabashihoncho towards Nishi-takashimadaira | Mita Line | Shin-itabashi towards Meguro |
Location
- Location within Special wards of Tokyo Location within Tokyo Bay and Bōsō Peninsula Location within Tokyo Location within Japan

Itabashikuyakushomae Station (板橋区役所前駅, Itabashi-kuyakusho-mae eki) is a metro station on the Toei Mita Line in Itabashi, Tokyo, Japan, operated by Toei Subway. It is located under Itabashi City Office, and the station name translates as "In front of Itabashi Ward Office".

== Lines ==
Itabashikuyakushomae Station is served by the Toei Mita Line subway, and is numbered I-18.

== Station layout ==
The station consists of two side platforms serving two tracks.

=== Platforms ===
1
2
Mita Line
Mita Line
- for Sugamo, Ōtemachi, and Meguro
- Meguro Line for Musashi-Kosugi and Hiyoshi
- Sotetsu Main Line for Ebina via the Tokyu/Sotetsu Shin-Yokohama Line
- Sotetsu Izumino Line for Shōnandai via the Tokyu/Sotetsu Shin-Yokohama Line
for Nishi-takashimadaira

== History ==
Itabashikuyakushomae Station opened on 27 December 1968.

== Surrounding area ==
- Itabashi City Office
- The Nakajuku district
