= Hibiya =

Neighborhood of Chiyoda, Tokyo, Japan

Coordinates: 35°41′38.41″N 139°45′12.94″E

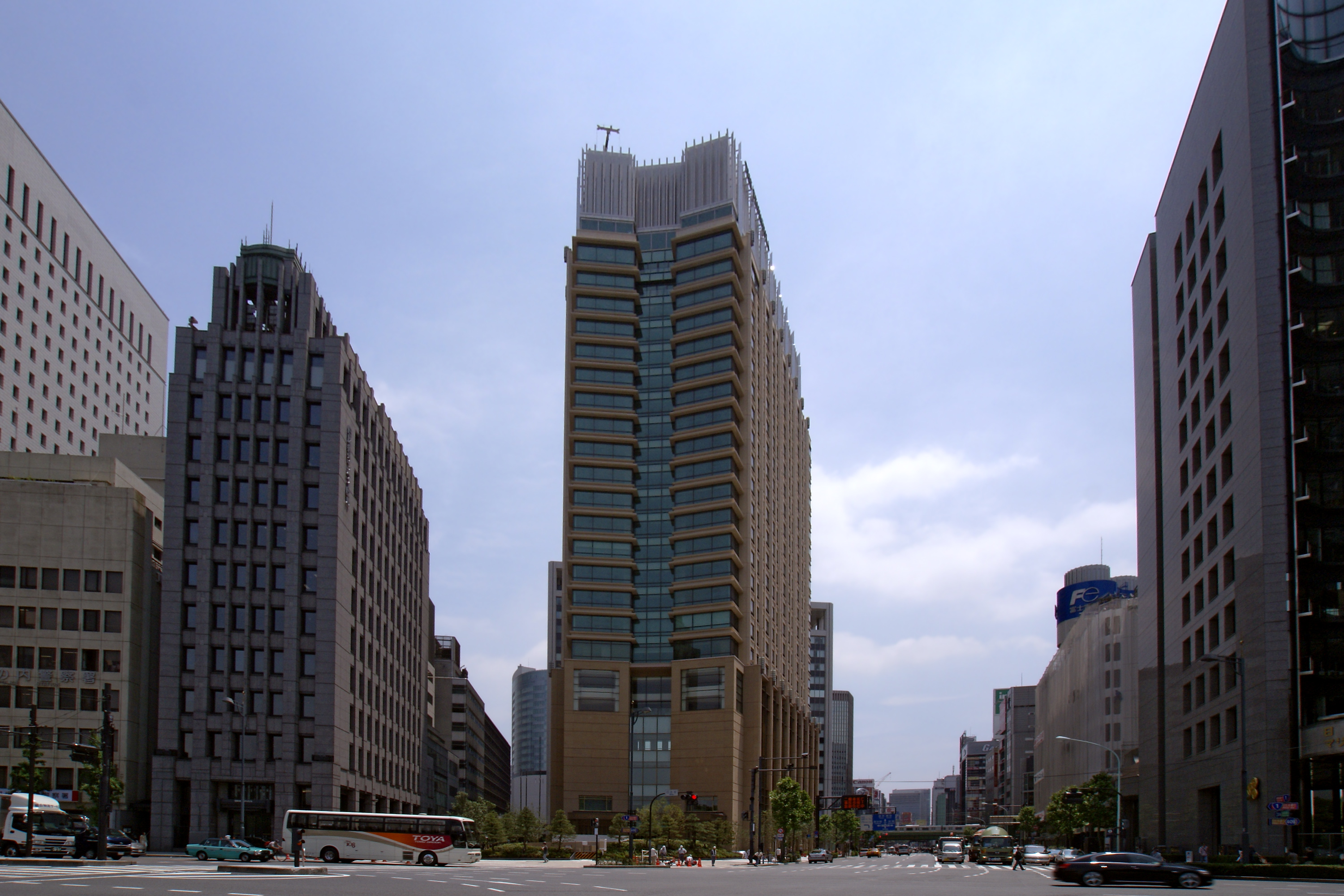
Buildings in Hibiya/Yūrakuchō

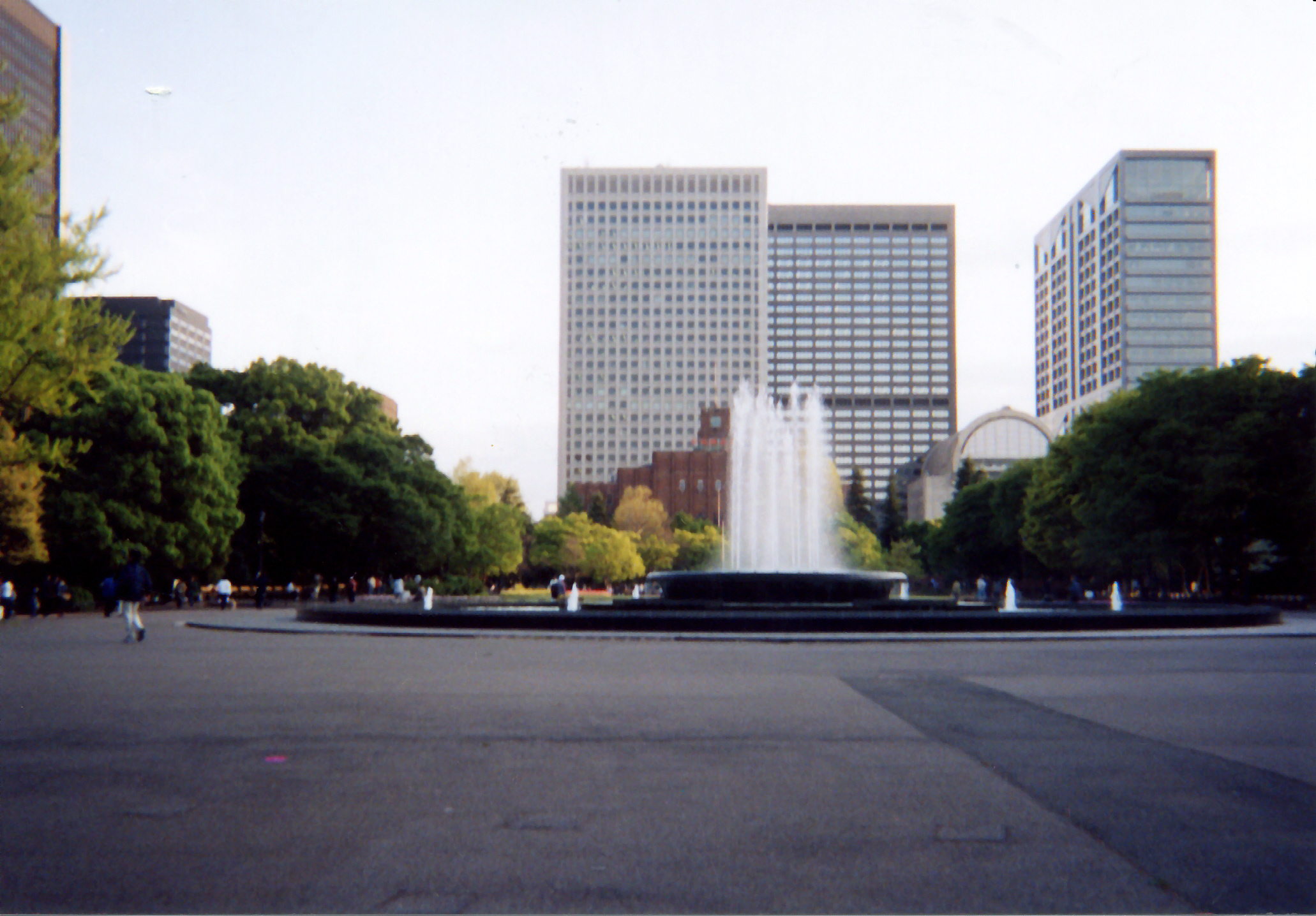
Hibiya Park

Hibiya (日比谷) is a colloquial name for a neighborhood of Chiyoda Ward in Tokyo. The area along Hibiya Street (National Route 1) from Yūrakuchō to Uchisaiwaichō is generally considered Hibiya district. Administratively, it is part of the Yūrakuchō district.

There is no actual administrative district in Chiyoda called "Hibiya" but the name is used in some local place names such as Hibiya Park and Hibiya Station (administratively in Yūrakuchō). Hibiya was part of the old Kōjimachi ward in Tokyo City, before it was transformed into a metropolis.

== Etymology ==
The outskirts of this district are reclaimed from the ocean, and the "hibi" of Hibiya is derived from the facility for the laver of nori made of bamboo, whose name is also "hibi". This effectively makes the word an ateji, kanji characters used to phonetically represent native Japanese words.

== History ==
Originally an inlet of the sea ran northwards to a cove at present-day Hibiya and Kokyo Gaien plaza, into which the Kanda River flowed.

In the era of Tokugawa shogunate, the Tokugawa bakufu worked out of Edo castle and the area surrounding Edo castle was developed and landfilled. The fishing village then became an urban area where many daimyō lived.

On September 5, 1905, Hibiya Park was the initial site of the Hibiya riots, which expanded into a citywide riot, triggered by the terms of the Treaty of Portsmouth which ended the Russo-Japanese War (1904−1905).

After the end of the Meiji Restoration Hibiya, the city of Tokyo had become a modern city for there were many buildings including the Imperial Hotel (Tokyo's first western hotel), Rokumeikan, Tokyo city hall and the Tokyo Club. In the 1930s, the first electric traffic light in Japan appeared at a Hibiya crossing point. The once fashionable district has changed into a business street.

== Transportation ==
- Hibiya Station
  - Toei Mita Line
  - Tokyo Metro Hibiya Line
  - Tokyo Metro Chiyoda Line
- Yūrakuchō Station
  - JR East Yamanote Line
  - JR East Keihin-Tōhoku Line
  - Tokyo Metro Yūrakuchō Line

Hibiya and Yurakucho stations are connected by underground passageways.

== See also ==
- Tokyo Midtown Hibiya, a mixed use building overlooking Hibiya Park
- Yurakucho, an administrative district covering the entire Hibiya area
- Hibiya Godzilla Square – Square in Tokyo, Japan
