= Yūrakuchō =

Business district of Chiyoda, Tokyo

Coordinates: 35.673164°N 139.760545°E

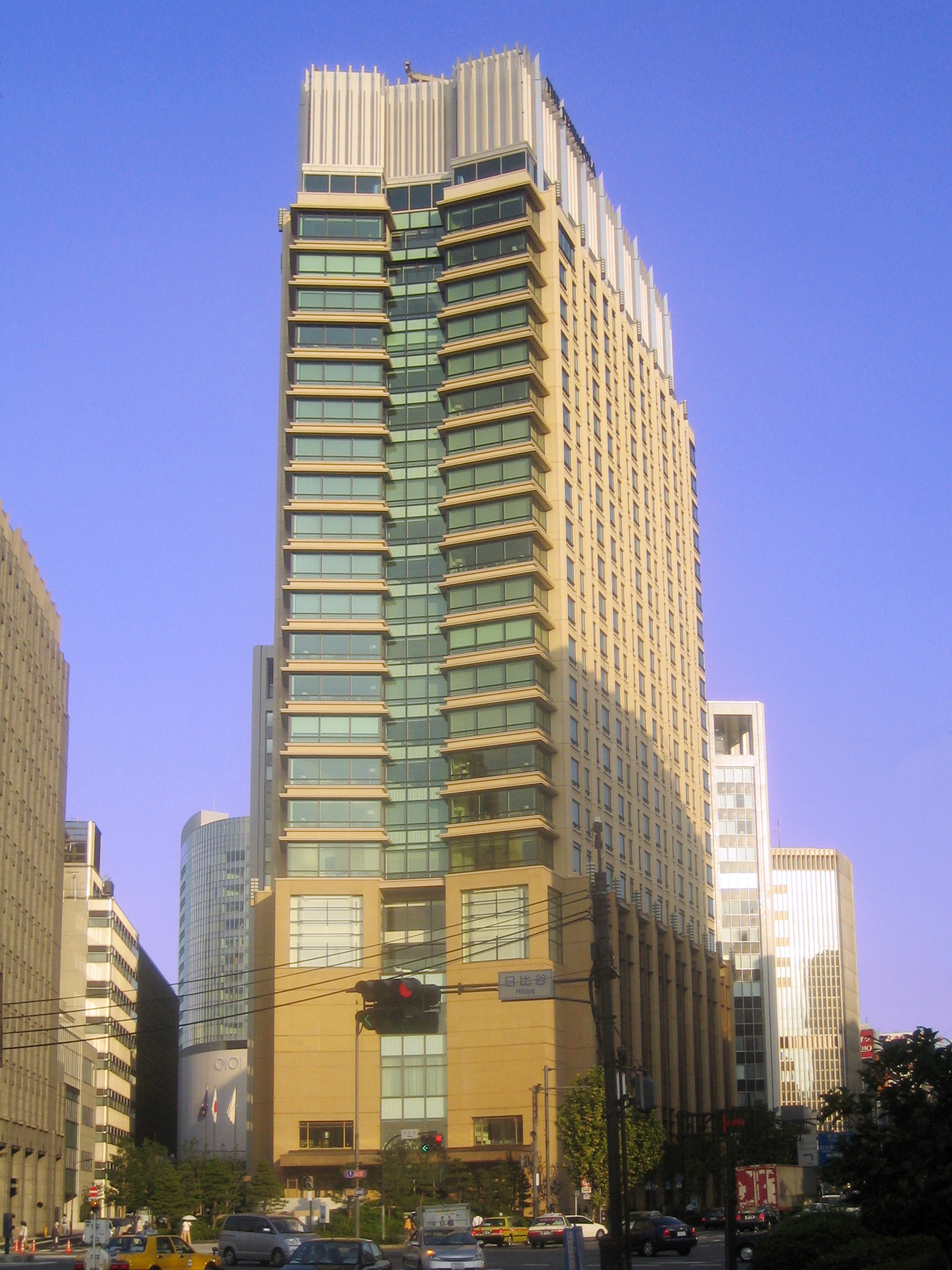
The Peninsula Tokyo in Yūrakuchō

Yūrakuchō (有楽町) is a business district of Chiyoda, Tokyo, Japan, situated in between the Ginza and Hibiya Park, southeast of the Tokyo Imperial Palace. The district takes its name from Oda Nagamasu (1547–1622), who was also known as Yūraku (有楽). Oda Nagamasu built his mansion here on land granted by Tokugawa Ieyasu near the Sukiya-bashi Gate of Edo Castle. The place name dates from the Meiji period.

Yūrakuchō is served by several train and subway stations, including Hibiya Station (Toei Subway and Tokyo Metro lines) and Yūrakuchō Station (JR East and Tokyo Metro lines).

Unlike its tonier neighbor Ginza, Yūrakuchō provides a glimpse of Japanese life from the early postwar period, with its many izakaya (Japanese-style bars, denoted by their red lanterns known as akachochin) and outdoor yakitori restaurants, many of which are located near or under the train tracks serving Tokyo's JR Yamanote Line. Because of its easy access to Tokyo Station, Yūrakuchō bars and restaurants are popular among businessmen on their way home from work. The administrative Yūrakuchō district also covers the Hibiya area.

== History ==
In 1707, the Tokugawa shogunate established the Minami-machi Bugyō-sho, the office of one of the magistrates of Edo, in this area. The place name dates from the Meiji period. It arises from an altered pronunciation of Urakusai.

== Landmarks ==
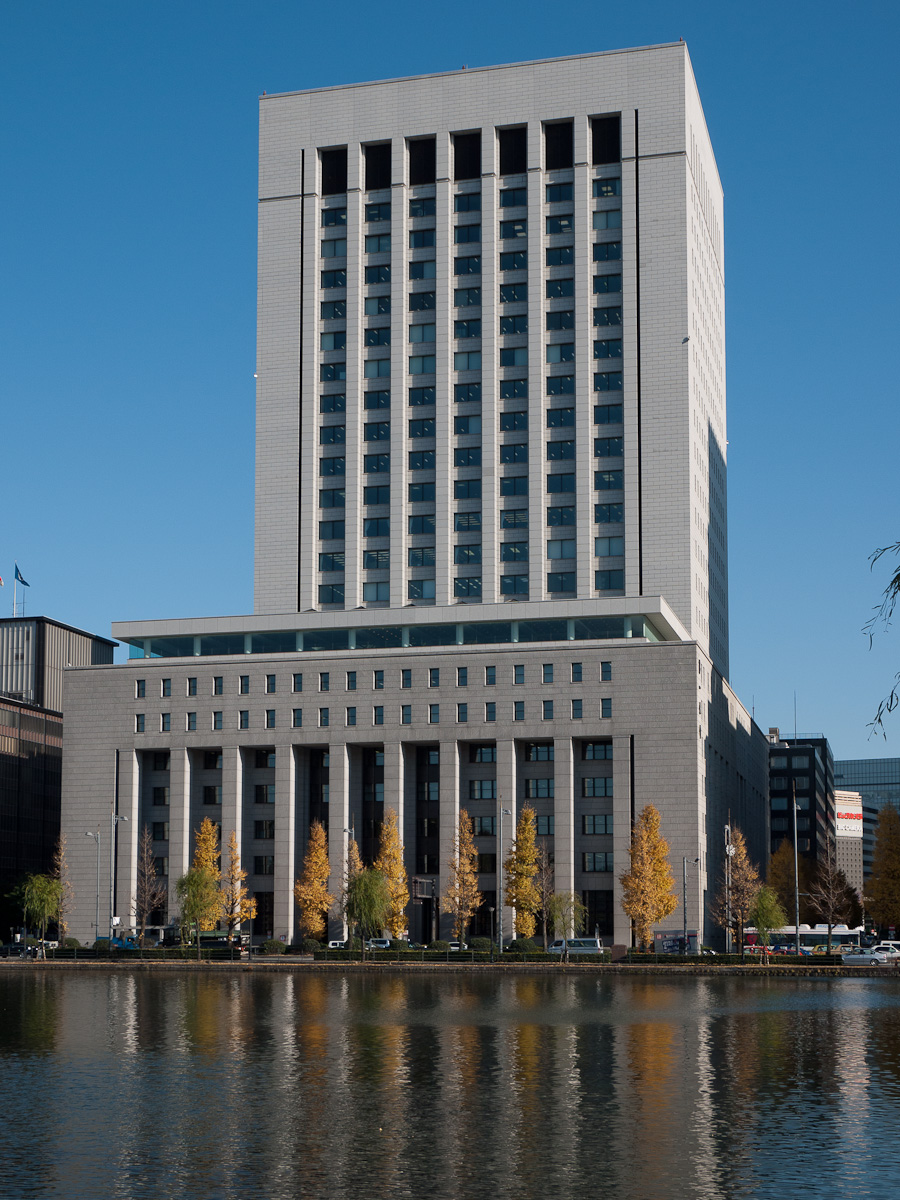
DN Tower 21 incorporates the building Douglas MacArthur used as the headquarters of SCAP.

One of the landmarks in Yūrakuchō is DN Tower 21. Home to Daiichi Life, the building, across the moat from the Tokyo Imperial Palace, was the headquarters of Supreme Commander for the Allied Powers Douglas MacArthur during the occupation of Japan. Norinchukin Bank shares the facility.

The Yūrakuchō Center Building (Yūrakuchō Mullion) complex, featuring retail, 7 movie theaters, convention halls, and parking, is also located here. The district has many theatres and cinemas, among them the Tokyo International Forum, Toho Imperial Theater, Nissei Theater, Marunouchi Tōei, Chanter, Tokyo Takarazuka Theater, Scala-za and Miyuki-za. The Hibiya Mitsui houses the home offices of the Sumitomo Mitsui Banking Corporation, Japan Steel Works, and Asahi Kasei, while the Shin Yūrakuchō Building is home to Asahi Glass Co., Nippon Paper Industries, and Nichiro Corporation. Toyota Tsusho and Toho have their headquarters in the district, and the Japan National Tourist Organization (JNTO) has both its headquarters and a Tourist Information Center in Yūrakuchō. The Foreign Correspondents' Club of Japan has its facilities in the Yūrakuchō Denki North Building.

Nippon Broadcasting System (JOLF-AM) broadcasts live from Yūrakuchō since its first broadcast. Fuji Television (JOCX-TV) formerly shared facilities with JOLF.

== Economy ==
Toho's headquarters, the Toho Hibiya Building (東宝日比谷ビル, Tōhō Hibiya Biru), are in Yūrakuchō, Chiyoda, Tokyo. The company moved into its current headquarters in April 2005.

Japan Airlines operates a domestic and international flights ticketing office on the first floor of the Yurakucho Denki Building in Yūrakuchō.

At one time Japan Asia Airways had its headquarters in the Yurakucho Denki Building, and Galaxy Airlines had its headquarters in the district.

== Transportation ==
- Hibiya Station
  - Toei Mita Line
  - Tokyo Metro Hibiya Line
  - Tokyo Metro Chiyoda Line
- Yūrakuchō Station
  - JR East Yamanote Line
  - JR East Keihin-Tōhoku Line
  - Tokyo Metro Yūrakuchō Line

Hibiya and Yurakucho stations are connected by underground passageways.

== Education ==
Chiyoda Board of Education operates public elementary and junior high schools. Chiyoda Elementary School (千代田小学校) is the zoned elementary school for Yūrakuchō 1-2 chōme. There is a freedom of choice system for junior high schools in Chiyoda Ward, and so there are no specific junior high school zones.

== See also ==
- Hibiya
- Uchisaiwaicho
- Marunouchi
- Shitamachi
