= Shin-takashimadaira Station =

Metro station in Tokyo, Japan

Coordinates: 35.7903°N 139.6544°E

Shin-takashimadaira Station 新高島平駅

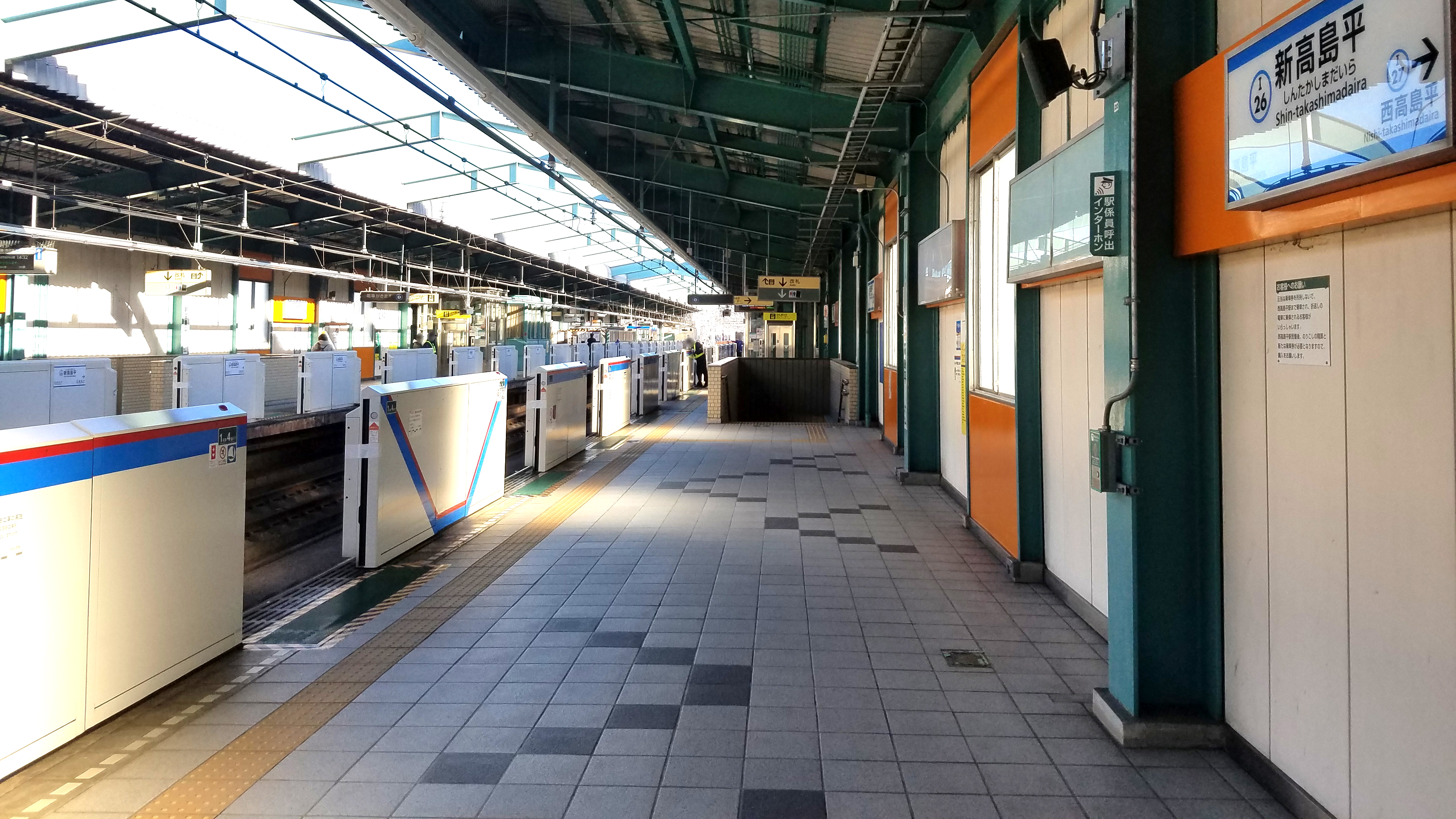
- The platforms, December 2019

General information
- Location: 7–1 Takashimadaira, Itabashi City, Tokyo （板橋区高島平7-1） Japan
- Operator: Toei Subway
- Line: Mita Line
- Platforms: 2 side platforms
- Tracks: 2

Construction
- Structure type: Elevated

Other information
- Station code: I-26

History
- Opened: 6 May 1976; 50 years ago

Services
Preceding station	Toei Subway	Following station
Nishi-takashimadaira Terminus	Mita Line	Takashimadaira towards Meguro
Location
- Location within Special wards of Tokyo Location within Tokyo Bay and Bōsō Peninsula Location within Tokyo Location within Japan

Shin-takashimadaira Station (新高島平駅, Shin-takashimadaira-eki) is a railway station on the Toei Mita Line in Itabashi, Tokyo, Japan, operated by the Tokyo subway operator Tokyo Metropolitan Bureau of Transportation (Toei).

== Lines ==
Shin-takashimadaira Station is served by the Toei Mita Line, and is numbered "I-26".

== Station layout ==
The station has two side platforms on the second-floor ("2F") level serving two tracks.

=== Platforms ===
1
2
Mita Line
Mita Line
- for Sugamo, Ōtemachi, and Meguro
- Meguro Line for Musashi-Kosugi and Hiyoshi
- Sotetsu Main Line for Ebina via the Tokyu/Sotetsu Shin-Yokohama Line
- Sotetsu Izumino Line for Shōnandai via the Tokyu/Sotetsu Shin-Yokohama Line
for Nishi-takashimadaira

== History ==
The station opened on 6 May 1976.

== See also ==
- List of railway stations in Japan
