= Itabashi Station =

Railway station in Tokyo, Japan

Coordinates: 35°44′46″N 139°43′10″E

JA13 Itabashi Station 板橋駅
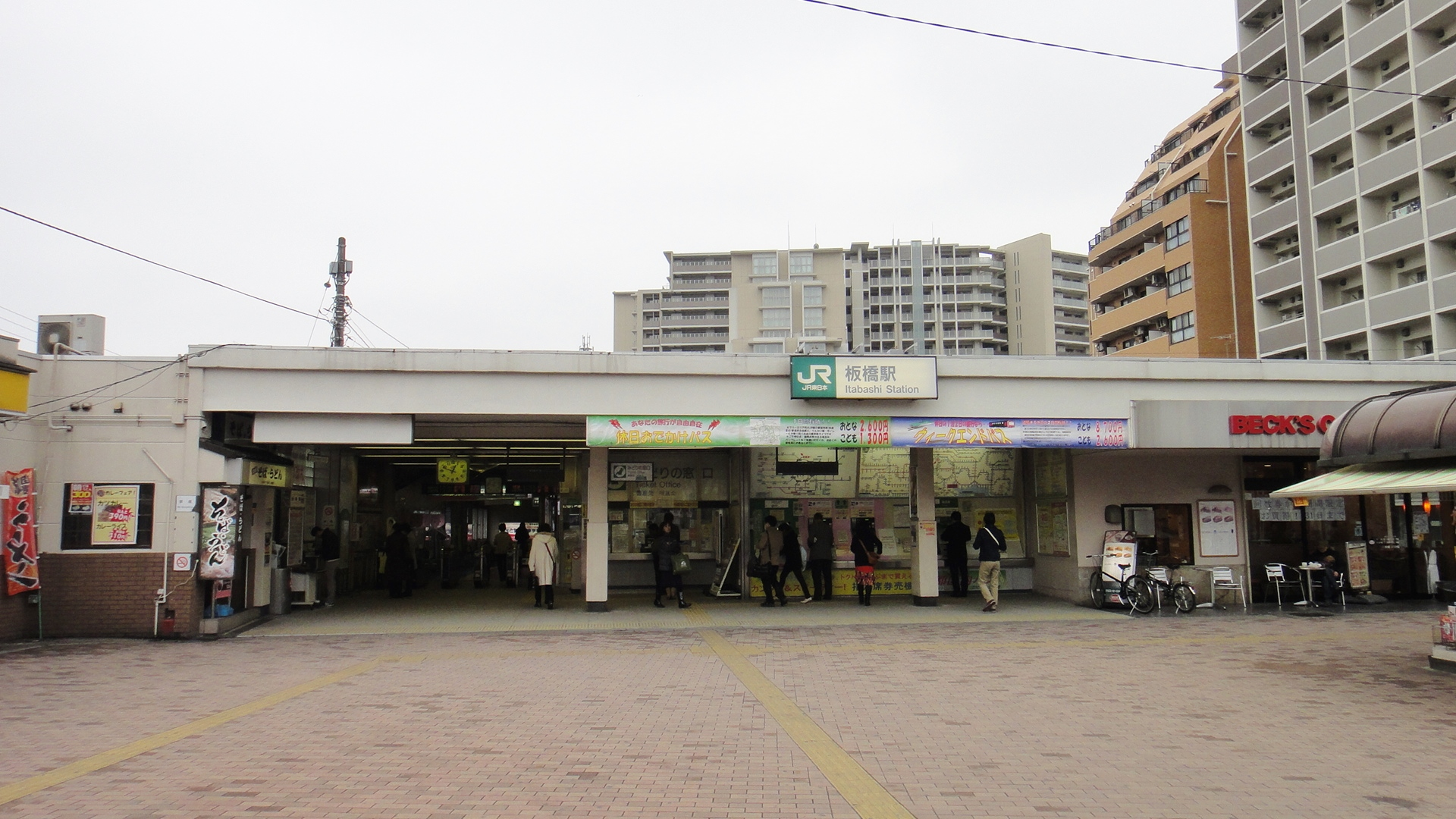
- West entrance, March 2013

General information
- Location: 4-1-7 Takinogawa , Kita, Tokyo （東京都北区滝野川七丁目4-1） Japan
- Operator: JR East
- Line: Saikyo Line
- Connections: Bus stop

History
- Opened: 1 March 1885

Passengers
- FY2011: 30,168 daily

Services
Preceding station	JR East	Following station
Ikebukuro towards Ōsaki	Saikyō Line Commuter Rapid Rapid Local	Jūjō JA14 towards Ōmiya
Location

Itabashi Station (板橋駅, Itabashi-eki) is a railway station on the Saikyo Line in Tokyo, Japan, operated by East Japan Railway Company (JR East). The station spans three municipalities: Kita (East Exit and station office), Itabashi (West Exit and northside of the platform), and Toshima (south side of the platform).

== Lines ==
Itabashi Station is served by the Akabane Line between Ikebukuro and Akabane stations, which forms part of the Saikyo Line which runs between Ōsaki in Tokyo and Ōmiya in Saitama Prefecture. Some trains continue northward to Kawagoe via the Kawagoe Line and southward to Shin-Kiba via the TWR Rinkai Line. The station is located 1.8 km north of Ikebukuro Station.

== Station layout ==
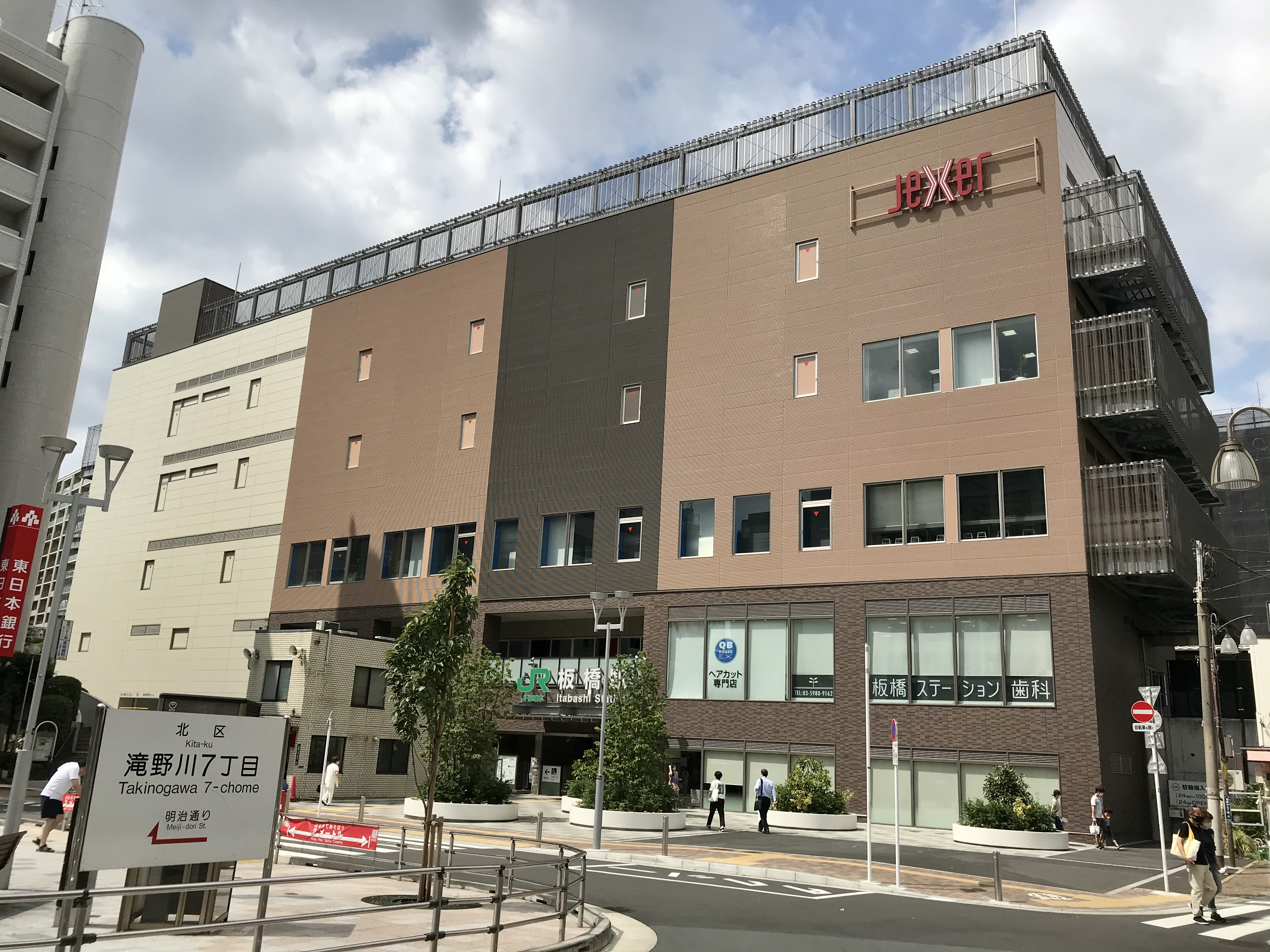
East (Takinogawa) entrance, September 2020

The station consists of a single island platform serving two tracks.

The station has a "Midori no Madoguchi" staffed ticket office.

=== Platforms ===
1	Saikyō Line	for Akabane, Musashi-Urawa, Ōmiya ■ Kawagoe Line through service to Kawagoe
2	Saikyō Line	for Ikebukuro, Shinjuku, and Ōsaki; Rinkai Line through service to Shin-Kiba; Sotetsu Line through service to Hazawa yokohama-kokudai and Ebina

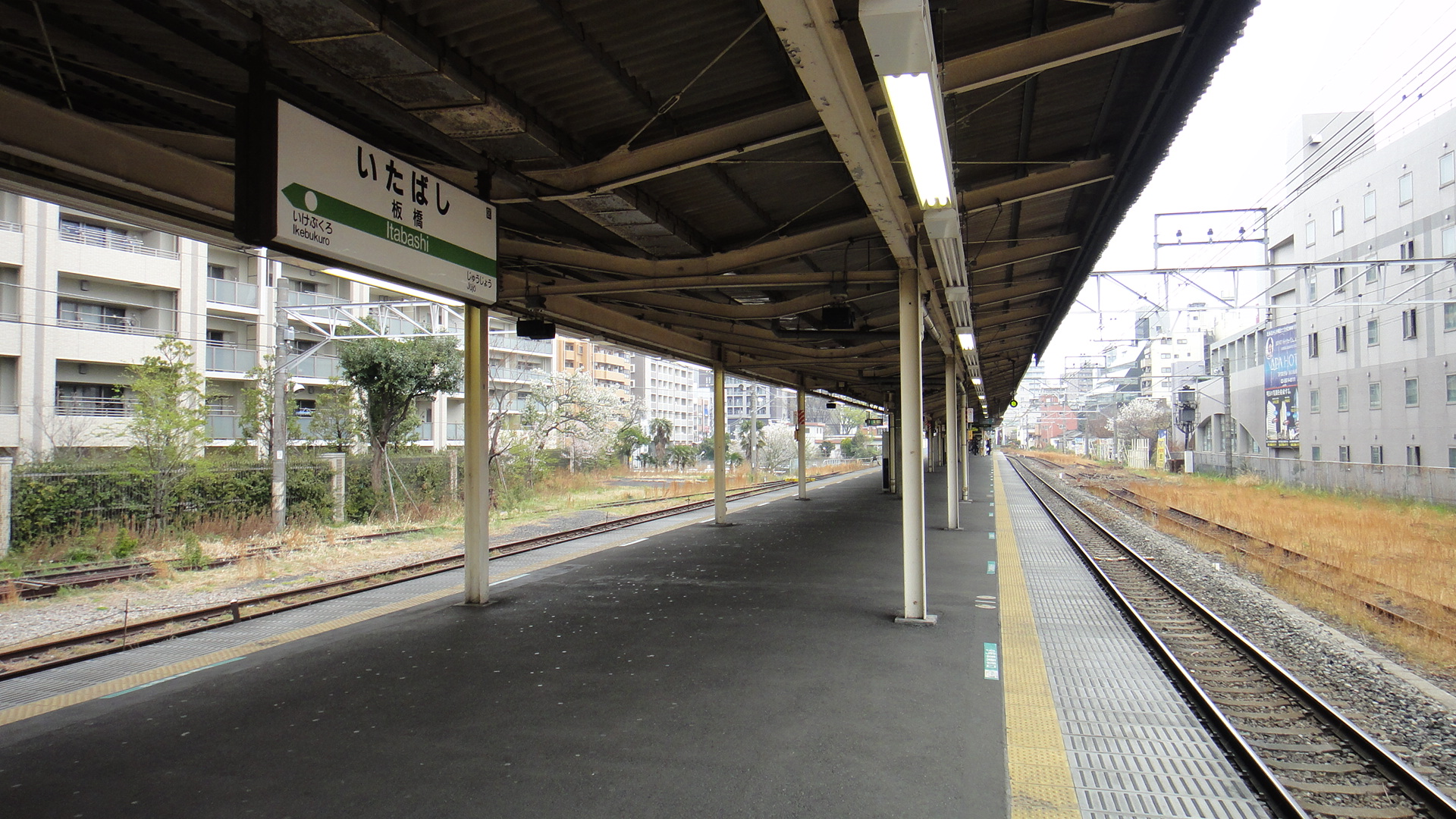
View of the platforms looking north, March 2013

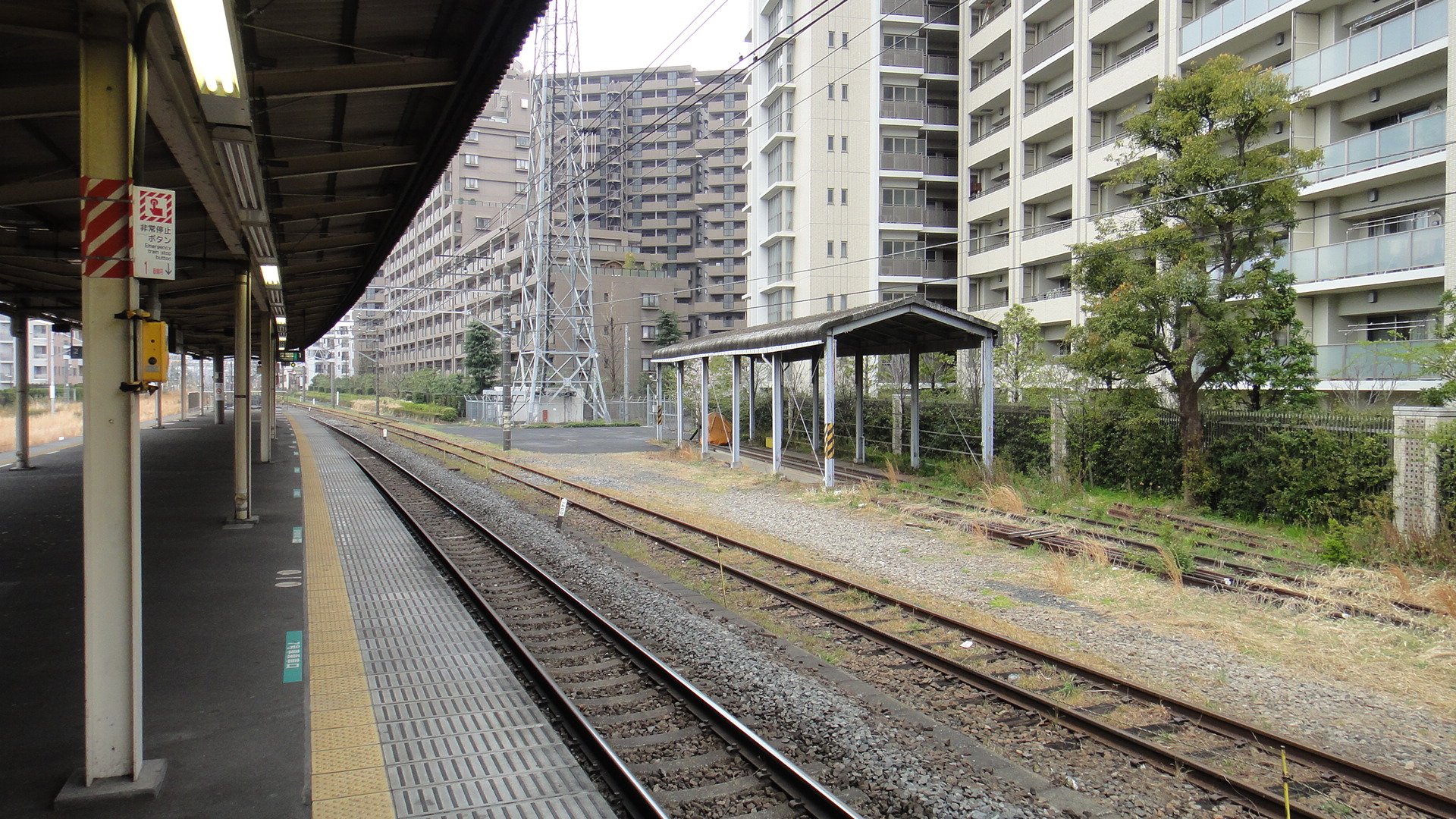
Disused permanent way maintenance sidings on the west side, March 2013

== History ==
Itabashi Station opened on 1 March 1885.

== Passenger statistics ==
In fiscal 2011, the station was used by an average of 30,168 passengers daily (boarding passengers only).

The passenger figures for previous years are as shown below.

Fiscal year	Daily average
2000	28,522
2005	29,348
2010	29,871
2011	30,168

== Surrounding area ==
- Shin-Itabashi Station (Toei Mita Line)
- Shimo-Itabashi Station (Tobu Tojo Line)
- Tokyo Metropolitan Kitazono High School
- Sugamo High School
