= Toei Mita Line =

Subway line in Tokyo, Japan

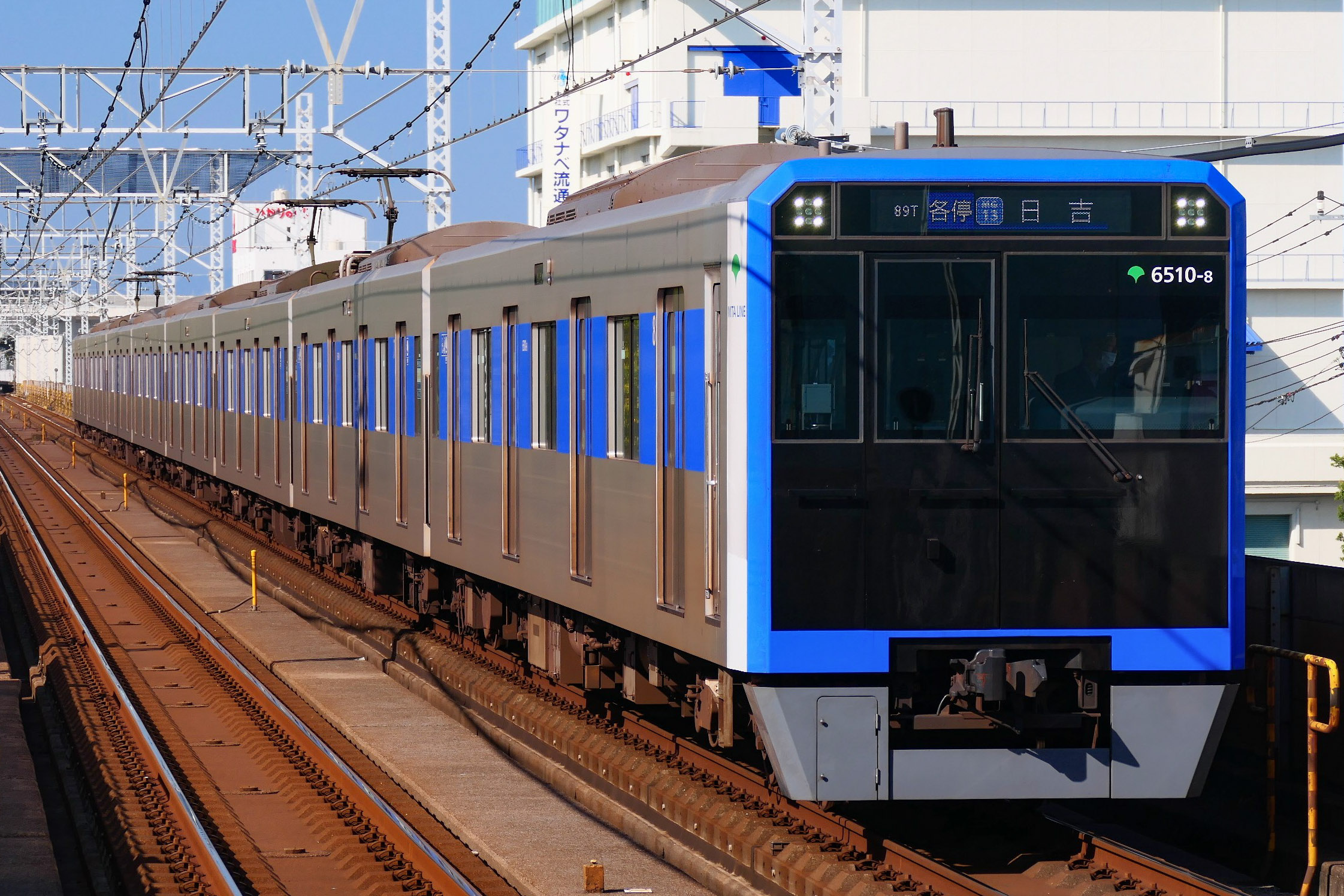
- A Toei 6500 series train at Shin-takashimadaira Station

Overview
- Other name: Line 6
- Native name: 都営三田線
- Status: In service
- Owner: Tokyo Metropolitan Bureau of Transportation
- Line number: I
- Locale: Tokyo
- Termini: Nishi-takashimadaira; Meguro
- Stations: 27
- Color on map: Blue

Service
- Type: Rapid transit
- System: Tokyo subway (Toei Subway)
- Operator: Tokyo Metropolitan Bureau of Transportation
- Depot: Shimura
- Rolling stock: Toei 6300 and 6500 series; Tokyu 3000, 3020 and 5080 series; Sotetsu 21000 series
- Daily ridership: 638,365 (2016)

History
- Opened: 27 December 1968; 57 years ago
- Last extension: 2000

Technical
- Line length: 26.5 km (16.5 mi)
- Track gauge: 1,067 mm (3 ft 6 in)
- Minimum radius: 160 m (520 ft)
- Electrification: Overhead line, 1,500 V DC
- Operating speed: 75 km/h (47 mph)
- Signalling: Cab signalling, closed block
- Train protection system: New CS-ATC
- Maximum incline: 3.5%
Route map
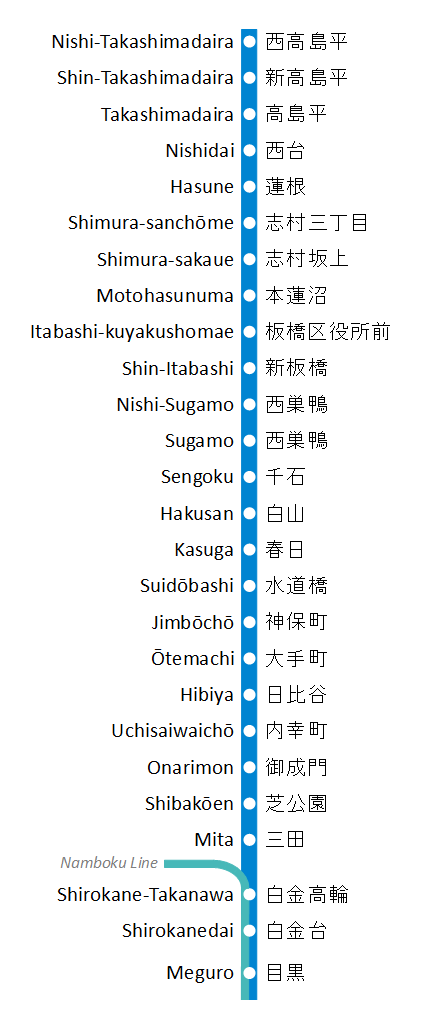

The Toei Mita Line (都営三田線, Toei Mita-sen) is a subway line of the municipal Toei Subway network in Tokyo, Japan. The line runs between Nishi-Takashimadaira in Itabashi and Meguro in Shinagawa. Trains continue with direct service into the Meguro Line of Tokyu Corporation for Hiyoshi. The portion between Shirokane-Takanawa and Meguro is shared with the Tokyo Metro Namboku Line.

The line was named after the Mita district in Minato, Tokyo, under which it passes. The name “Mita Line” dates to 1904, when a Tokyo tram line of the same name opened, operating above ground between Hibiya and Mita along the route of the present line.

In fiscal year 2023, the Mita Line was Toei's second most profitable line, earning 6.30 billion yen in surplus (after the Asakusa Line). It served 606,811 passengers on average per day, the lowest in the Toei network.

On maps and signboards, the line is shown in blue. Stations carry the letter "I" followed by a two-digit number.

== Overview ==
Most platforms on the Mita Line are equipped with chest-height automatic platform gates that open in sync with the train doors. The line was the first in the Tokyo subway system to have low barriers. The section between Shirokane-Takanawa and Meguro, which is shared with the Tokyo Metro Namboku Line, has used full-height platform screen doors since its opening. As of April 2022, the platform doors have been fully replaced for 8 car operations.

The right-of-way and stations between Shirokane-Takanawa and Meguro are shared with the Tokyo Metro Namboku Line – a unique situation on the Tokyo subway where both operators share common infrastructure. Under an agreement of both parties, the fare for this section is calculated on the Toei system for passengers travelling to stations on the Mita Line past Shirokane-Takanawa, using the Tokyo Metro system for those travelling on the Namboku Line past Shirokane-Takanawa, and on the system "most beneficial to the passenger" (presently the Tokyo Metro schedule) for travel solely on the shared section.

According to the Tokyo Metropolitan Bureau of Transportation, as of June 2009, the Mita Line is the ninth most crowded subway line in Tokyo, running at 164%^{[a]} capacity between Nishi-Sugamo and Sugamo stations.

== History ==
The Mita Line was first envisioned in 1957 as a northern branch of Line 5 (the present Tōzai Line), serving the section between Ōtemachi and Itabashi. Under a revised proposal in 1962, the line was made independent and its construction was undertaken by the Tokyo Metropolitan Government. The new line (Line 6) was planned to run from Gotanda Station on the southwestern side of the Yamanote Line through central Tokyo, with its northern extensions via Yamatochō (大和町) in Itabashi (near present Itabashi-honchō), diverting to Kami-Itabashi and Shimura (志村) (present Takashimadaira). The southernmost portion, from Sengakuji to Nishi-Magome and Nishi-Magome depot, was to be shared with Line 1 (Asakusa Line); therefore, Line 6 would be 1,435 mm (4 ft 8 1/2 in) gauge.

Due to political considerations, the design of the Mita Line changed several times during the early 1960s. There were plans for it to run to Toda, Saitama, to serve a boat-racing venue for the 1964 Summer Olympics. The government of Saitama also proposed the construction of a new subway line which would allow through service on the Mita Line as far as Ōmiya Station. In 1964, these plans were changed to allow the Mita Line to connect with the Tōbu Tōjō Line via a branch to be built by Tobu between Yamatomachi (大和町) (now Wakōshi), and Shimura, the northern end of Line 6. At the southern end, the junction with the Tokyu network would be via a connecting line, which would be constructed by Tokyu from Sengakuji to Kirigaya (桐ヶ谷) on the Tōkyū Ikegami Line; the route would continue to the then-Den-en-toshi Line and finally west, down to Nagatsuta. As a result, the construction standards of Line 6 were based on those of Tobu and Tokyu (such as 1,067 mm (3 ft 6 in) gauge track and 20-meter-long cars – today, the Mita Line is the only Toei line to use this gauge). A depot was planned at Shimura, independent of the Nishi-Magome depot on Line 1.

However, both Tokyu and Tobu decided the following year to operate their thorough services with the Teito Rapid Transit Authority (TRTA, now Tokyo Metro) lines instead. With no thorough service opportunities available the Tokyo Metropolitan Government began construction on the central portion of the line, leaving the plans for the Itabashi and Mita ends open for future development. This required an extension somewhere south of Seishōkō-mae (清正公前) (present Shirokane-Takanawa), probably to the then-Mekama Line of Tokyu (on the commencement of inter running to Mita and Namboku lines, the Mekama Line was divided into the Meguro Line and Tōkyū Tamagawa Line) which competed with TRTA Line 7, later called the Tokyo Metro Namboku Line.

The first segment of the line opened on 27 December 1968, between Sugamo and Takashimadaira (10.4 km (6.5 mi)). The line was extended a further 7.3 km (4.5 mi) south to Hibiya on 30 June 1972, and 3.3 km (2.1 mi) further south to Mita on 27 November 1973. The northern 1.3 km (0.81 mi) extension (originally licensed to Tobu and later transferred to Toei Subway) was completed on 6 May 1976. For the next 24 years, the line operated between Mita and Nishi-Takashimadaira; the authorized Mita and Sengakuji section had been left uncompleted.

In 1985 the then-Ministry of Transport finally settled the plan regarding the southern extension of the line and shelved all plans for further extension to the north due to the development of the Saikyō Line. On 26 September 2000, the final 4 km (2.5 mi) segment from Mita to Meguro opened, and through service to the Meguro Line of Tokyu began at the same time, at which point the line switched to driver-only operation.

By the end of 2020, all platform screen doors on the Mita Line were extended to accommodate 8 cars in preparation of the Sōtetsu Tōkyū Link Line through service from the Sotetsu Line.

Mita Line through services to and from the Sotetsu Line began operation on 18 March 2023. Effective that date, the Mita Line began providing through services as far south as Ebina on the Sotetsu Main Line and Shonandai on the Sotetsu Izumino Line, with a fraction of trips turning around at Shin-Yokohama Station. Most local services still make it as far south as Hiyoshi on the Tokyu Toyoko Line with some peak hour trips terminating at Musashi-Kosugi (also on the Toyoko Line).

== Stations ==
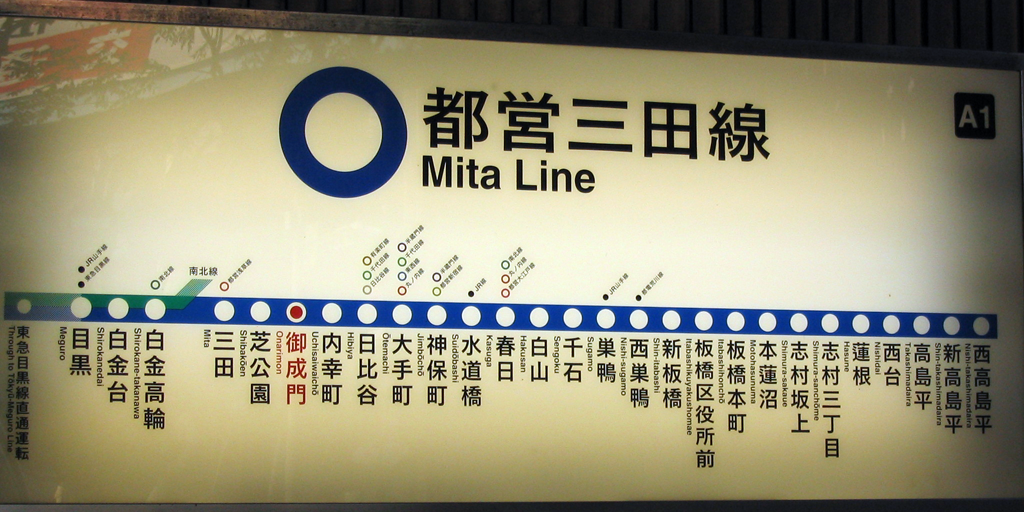
Line diagram

All stations are located in Tokyo.

No.	Station	Distance in km (mi)		Transfers	Location
No.	Station	Between stations	Total	Transfers	Location
↑ Through-running services to/from ↑: Okusawa, Musashi-Kosugi, Hiyoshi via Meguro Line; Shin-Yokohama via Tōkyū Shin-Yokohama Line; Nishiya via Sōtetsu Shin-Yokohama Line; Yamato, Ebina via Sōtetsu Main Line; Shōnandai via Sōtetsu Izumino Line
I-01	Meguro 目黒	—N/a	0 (0)	Meguro Line (MG01); Namboku Line (N-01); Yamanote Line (JY22)	Shinagawa
I-02	Shirokanedai 白金台	1.3 (0.81)		Namboku Line (N-02; shared)	Minato
I-03	Shirokane-takanawa 白金高輪	1.0 (0.62)	2.3 (1.4)	Namboku Line (N-03; shared)	Minato
I-04	Mita 三田	1.7 (1.1)	4.0 (2.5)	Asakusa Line (A-08); Yamanote Line (Tamachi: JY27); Keihin–Tōhoku Line (Tamachi: JK22)	Minato
I-05	Shibakoen 芝公園	0.6 (0.37)	4.6 (2.9)	Ōedo Line (Akabanebashi: E-21)	Minato
I-06	Onarimon 御成門	0.7 (0.43)	5.3 (3.3)		Minato
I-07	Uchisaiwaicho 内幸町	1.1 (0.68)	6.4 (4.0)	At Shimbashi: Ginza Line (G-08) Asakusa Line (A-10) Yamanote Line (JY29) Keihin–Tōhoku Line (JK24) Tōkaidō Line (JT02) Yokosuka Line (JO18) Yurikamome (U-01)	Chiyoda
I-08	Hibiya 日比谷	0.9 (0.56)	7.3 (4.5)	Hibiya Line (H-08); Chiyoda Line (C-09); Yūrakuchō Line (Yūrakuchō: Y-18); Yamanote Line (Yūrakuchō: JY30); Keihin–Tōhoku Line (Yūrakuchō: JK25); Underground passage to Ginza and Higashi-ginza stations	Chiyoda
I-09	Ōtemachi 大手町	0.9 (0.56)	8.2 (5.1)	Marunouchi Line (M-18); Tōzai Line (T-09); Chiyoda Line (C-11); Hanzōmon Line (Z-08)	Chiyoda
I-10	Jimbocho 神保町	1.4 (0.87)	9.6 (6.0)	Hanzōmon Line (Z-07); Shinjuku Line (S-06)	Chiyoda
I-11	Suidobashi 水道橋	1.0 (0.62)	10.6 (6.6)	Chūō–Sōbu Line (JB17)	Bunkyō
I-12	Kasuga 春日	0.7 (0.43)	11.3 (7.0)	Marunouchi Line (Korakuen: M-22); Namboku Line (Korakuen: N-11); Ōedo Line (E-07)	Bunkyō
I-13	Hakusan 白山	1.4 (0.87)	12.7 (7.9)		Bunkyō
I-14	Sengoku 千石	1.0 (0.62)	13.7 (8.5)		Bunkyō
I-15	Sugamo 巣鴨	0.9 (0.56)	14.6 (9.1)	Yamanote Line (JY11)	Toshima
I-16	Nishi-sugamo 西巣鴨	1.4 (0.87)	16.0 (9.9)	Toden Arakawa Line (Shin-koshinzuka: SA20)	Toshima
I-17	Shin-itabashi 新板橋	1.0 (0.62)	17.0 (10.6)	Saikyō Line (Itabashi: JA13)	Itabashi
I-18	Itabashikuyakushomae 板橋区役所前	0.9 (0.56)	17.9 (11.1)		Itabashi
I-19	Itabashihoncho 板橋本町	1.2 (0.75)	19.1 (11.9)		Itabashi
I-20	Motohasunuma 本蓮沼	0.9 (0.56)	20.0 (12.4)		Itabashi
I-21	Shimura-sakaue 志村坂上	1.1 (0.68)	21.1 (13.1)		Itabashi
I-22	Shimura-sanchome 志村三丁目	0.9 (0.56)	22.0 (13.7)		Itabashi
I-23	Hasune 蓮根	1.2 (0.75)	23.2 (14.4)		Itabashi
I-24	Nishidai 西台	0.8 (0.50)	24.0 (14.9)		Itabashi
I-25	Takashimadaira 高島平	1.0 (0.62)	25.0 (15.5)		Itabashi
I-26	Shin-takashimadaira 新高島平	0.7 (0.43)	25.7 (16.0)		Itabashi
I-27	Nishi-takashimadaira 西高島平	0.8 (0.50)	26.5 (16.5)		Itabashi

== Rolling stock ==
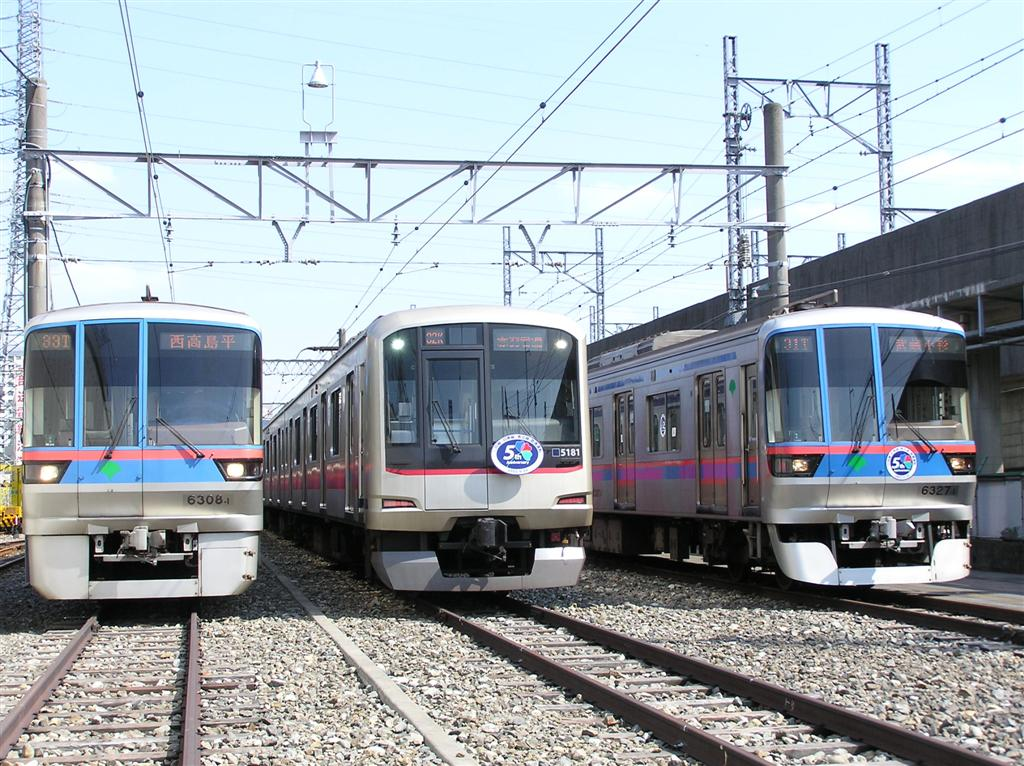
6300 series (left and right) and Tokyu 5080 series (center) at Shimura depot

=== Present ===
- Toei 6300 series 6-car sets (since 1993)
- Toei 6500 series 8-car sets (since 14 May 2022)
- Tokyu 3000 series 8-car sets (since 1999)
- Tokyu 3020 series 8-car sets (since 2020)
- Tokyu 5080 series 8-car sets (since 2003)
- Sotetsu 21000 series 8-car sets (since 18 March 2023)

=== Former rolling stock ===
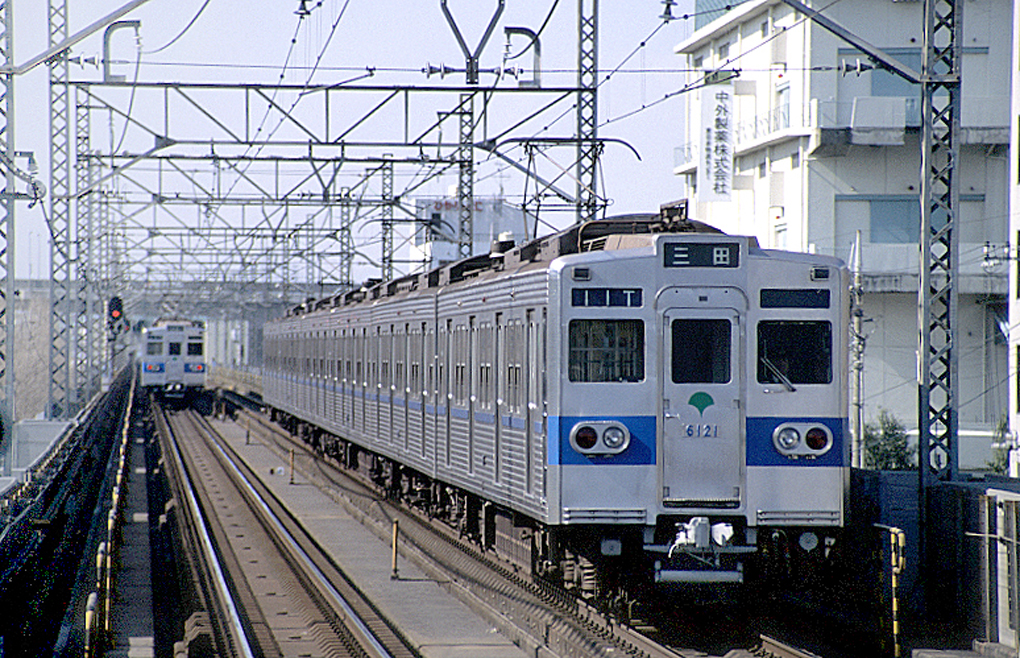
6000 series between Shin-Takashimadaira and Nishi-Takashimadaira, February 1999

- Toei 6000 series (from 1968 until 1999)
- Toei 10-000 series (prototype for Shinjuku Line EMUs)

== Maintenance facilities ==
- Shimura Depot at Takashimadaira

== Notes ==
a. Crowding levels defined by the Ministry of Land, Infrastructure, Transport and Tourism:

100% — Commuters have enough personal space and can take a seat or stand while holding onto the straps or hand rails.
150% — Commuters have enough personal space to read a newspaper.
180% — Commuters must fold newspapers to read.
200% — Commuters are pressed against each other in each compartment but can still read small magazines.
250% — Commuters are pressed against each other, unable to move.
