= Nishi-takashimadaira Station =

Metro station in Tokyo, Japan

Coordinates: 35.7919°N 139.6459°E

Nishi-takashimadaira Station 西高島平駅

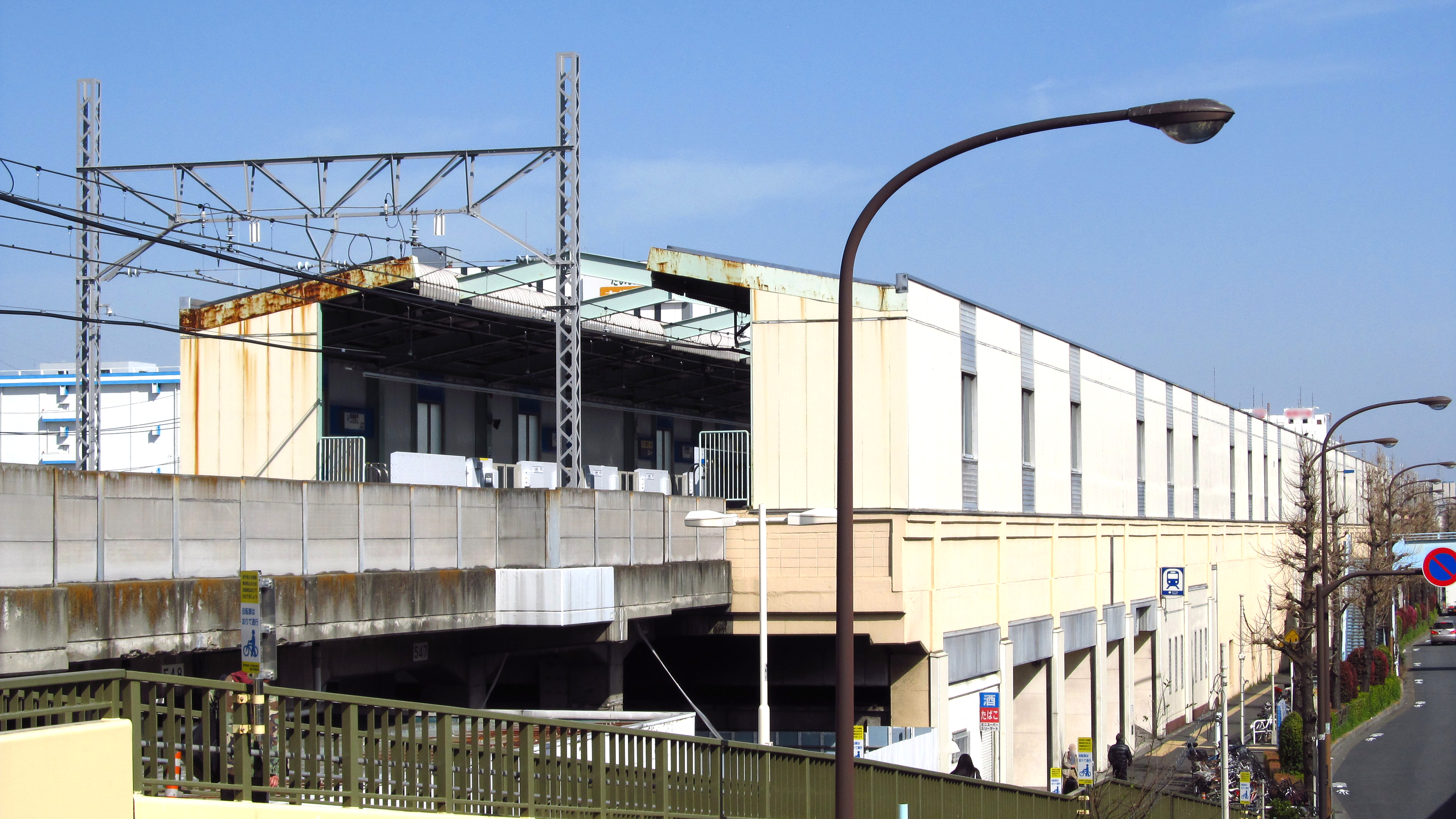
- Station building

General information
- Location: 6-1 Takashimadaira, Itabashi City, Tokyo （板橋区高島平6-1） Japan
- Operator: Toei Subway
- Line: Mita Line
- Platforms: 2 side platforms
- Tracks: 2

Construction
- Structure type: Elevated
- Accessible: Yes

Other information
- Station code: I-27

History
- Opened: 5 June 1976; 50 years ago

Passengers
- FY2011: 12,048 daily

Services
Preceding station	Toei Subway	Following station
Terminus	Mita Line	Shin-takashimadaira towards Meguro
Location
- Location within Special wards of Tokyo Location within Tokyo Bay and Bōsō Peninsula Location within Tokyo Location within Japan

Nishi-takashimadaira Station (西高島平駅, Nishi-takashimadaira eki) is a railway station on the Toei Mita Line in Itabashi, Tokyo, Japan, operated by the Tokyo subway operator Tokyo Metropolitan Bureau of Transportation (Toei). It is the northernmost station on the Tokyo subway network.

== Lines ==
Nishi-takashimadaira Station is served by the Toei Mita Line, and is numbered "I-27".

== Layout ==
The station consists of two side platforms both heading the same direction. This is one of the few dead-end terminal stations on the Tokyo subway network that have side platforms (the others being Nishi-Magome on the Asakusa Line and Kita-Ayase on the Chiyoda Line). The platforms are located on the second floor ("2F") level.

=== Platforms ===
1-2
Mita Line
- for Sugamo, Ōtemachi, and Meguro
- Meguro Line for Musashi-Kosugi and Hiyoshi
- Sotetsu Main Line for Ebina via the Tokyu/Sotetsu Shin-Yokohama Line
- Sotetsu Izumino Line for Shōnandai via the Tokyu/Sotetsu Shin-Yokohama Line

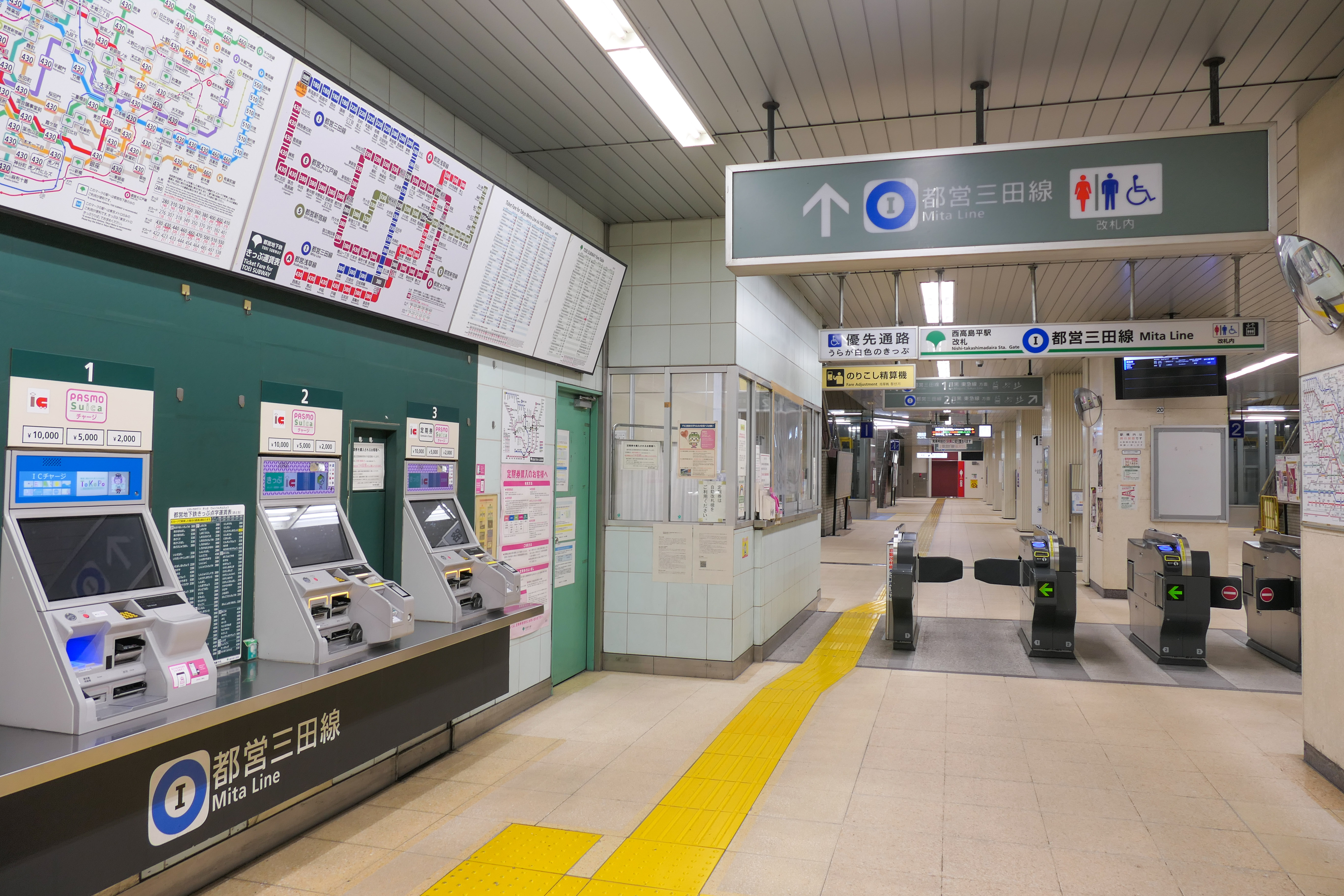
Ticket gates

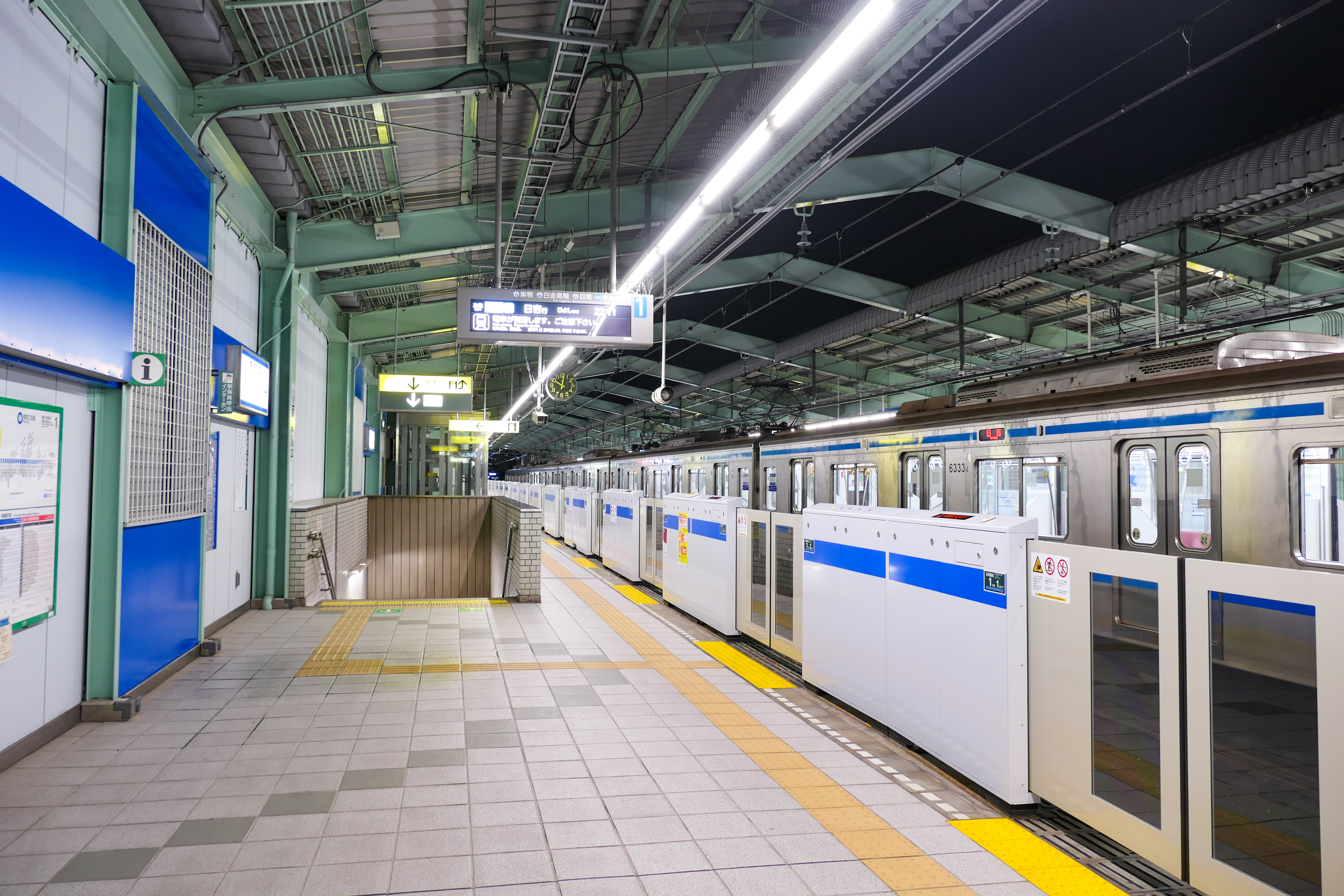
Platforms

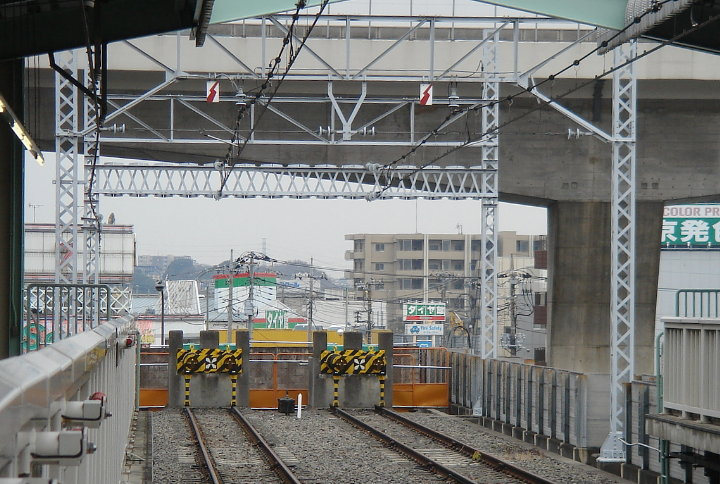
Buffer stops

== History ==
The station opened on 5 June 1976.

== Passenger statistics ==
In fiscal 2011, the station was used by an average of 12,048 passengers daily.

== See also ==
- List of railway stations in Japan
