= Sugamo Station =

Railway and metro station in Tokyo, Japan

Coordinates: 35.733345°N 139.739496°E

JY11 Sugamo Station 巣鴨駅

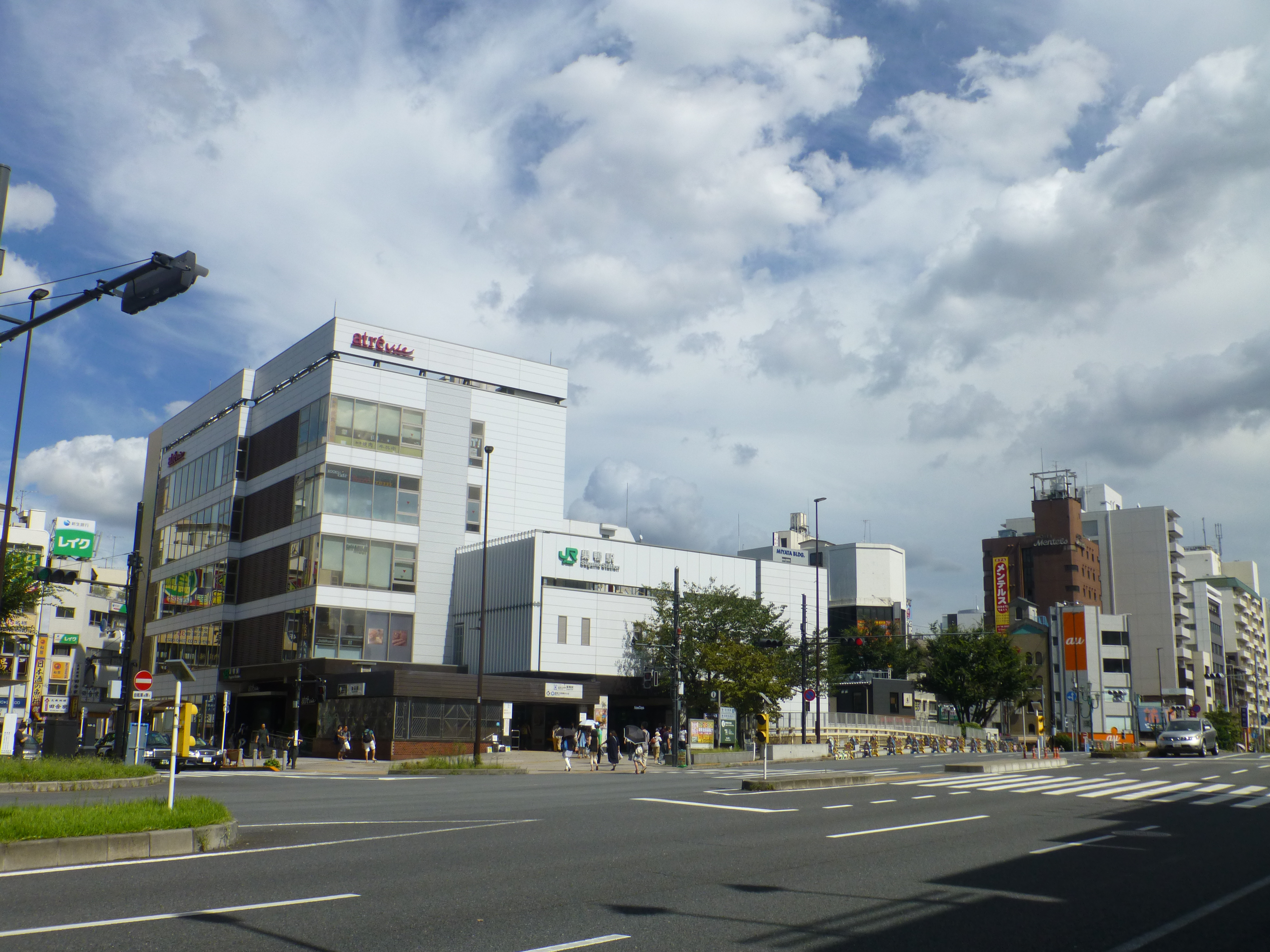
- JR station building in August 2016

Japanese name
- Shinjitai: 巣鴨駅
- Kyūjitai: 巢鴨驛
- Hiragana: すがもえき

General information
- Location: 1 Sugamo, Toshima City, Tokyo; Japan
- Operator: JR East; Toei Subway
- Lines: Yamanote Line; Mita Line
- Platforms: 2 island platforms (1 for each line)
- Tracks: 4 (2 for each line)
- Connections: Bus terminal

Construction
- Structure type: Above ground (Yamanote Line); Underground (Mita Line)
- Accessible: Yes

Other information
- Station code: I-15 (Mita Line); JY11 (Yamanote Line)

History
- Opened: 1 April 1903; 123 years ago

Passengers
- FY2024: 134,320 daily; 53,999 daily

Services
Preceding station	JR East	Following station
Ōtsuka JY12 Next counter-clockwise	Yamanote Line	Komagome JY10 Next clockwise
Preceding station	Toei Subway	Following station
Nishi-sugamo towards Nishi-takashimadaira	Mita Line	Sengoku towards Meguro
Location
- Location within Tokyo Yamanote Loop Location within Tokyo wards area Location within Japan

Sugamo Station (巣鴨駅, sugamo-eki) is a railway station in Toshima, Tokyo, Japan, operated by the East Japan Railway Company (JR East) and Toei Subway.

== Lines ==
Sugamo Station is served by the following two lines.

- Yamanote Line
- Toei Mita Line

== Station layout ==
Platform edge doors were installed on the Yamanote Line platforms during fiscal 2013.

=== JR East platforms ===
1	Yamanote Line	for Tabata, Ueno, and Tokyo
2	Yamanote Line	for Ikebukuro, Shinjuku, and Shibuya

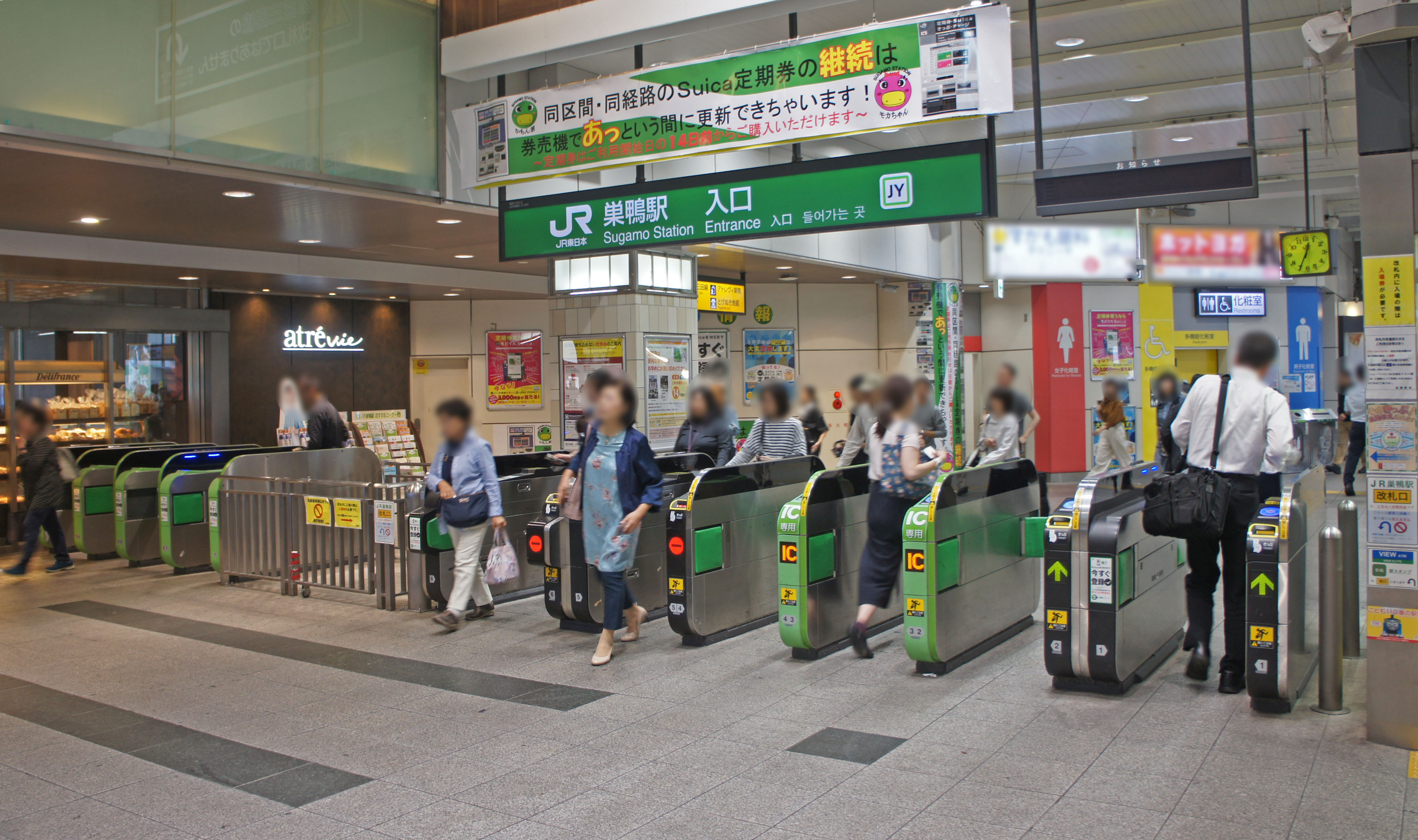
JR East ticket gates

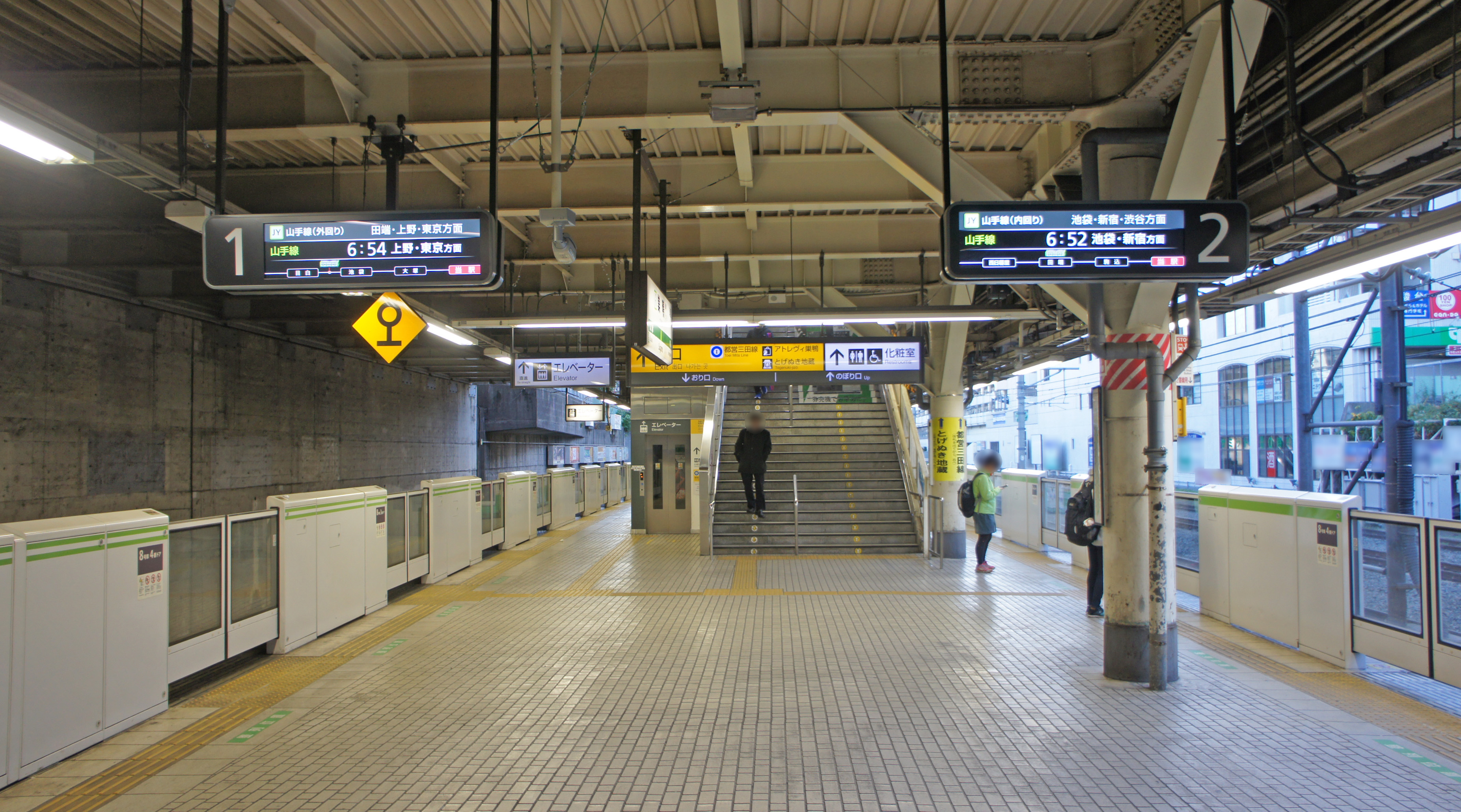
Yamanote Line platforms

=== Toei platforms ===
1
2
Mita Line
Mita Line
- for Ōtemachi, Shirokane-takanawa, and Meguro
- Meguro Line for Musashi-Kosugi and Hiyoshi
- Sotetsu Main Line for Ebina via the Tokyu/Sotetsu Shin-Yokohama Line
- Sotetsu Izumino Line for Shōnandai via the Tokyu/Sotetsu Shin-Yokohama Line
for Nishi-takashimadaira

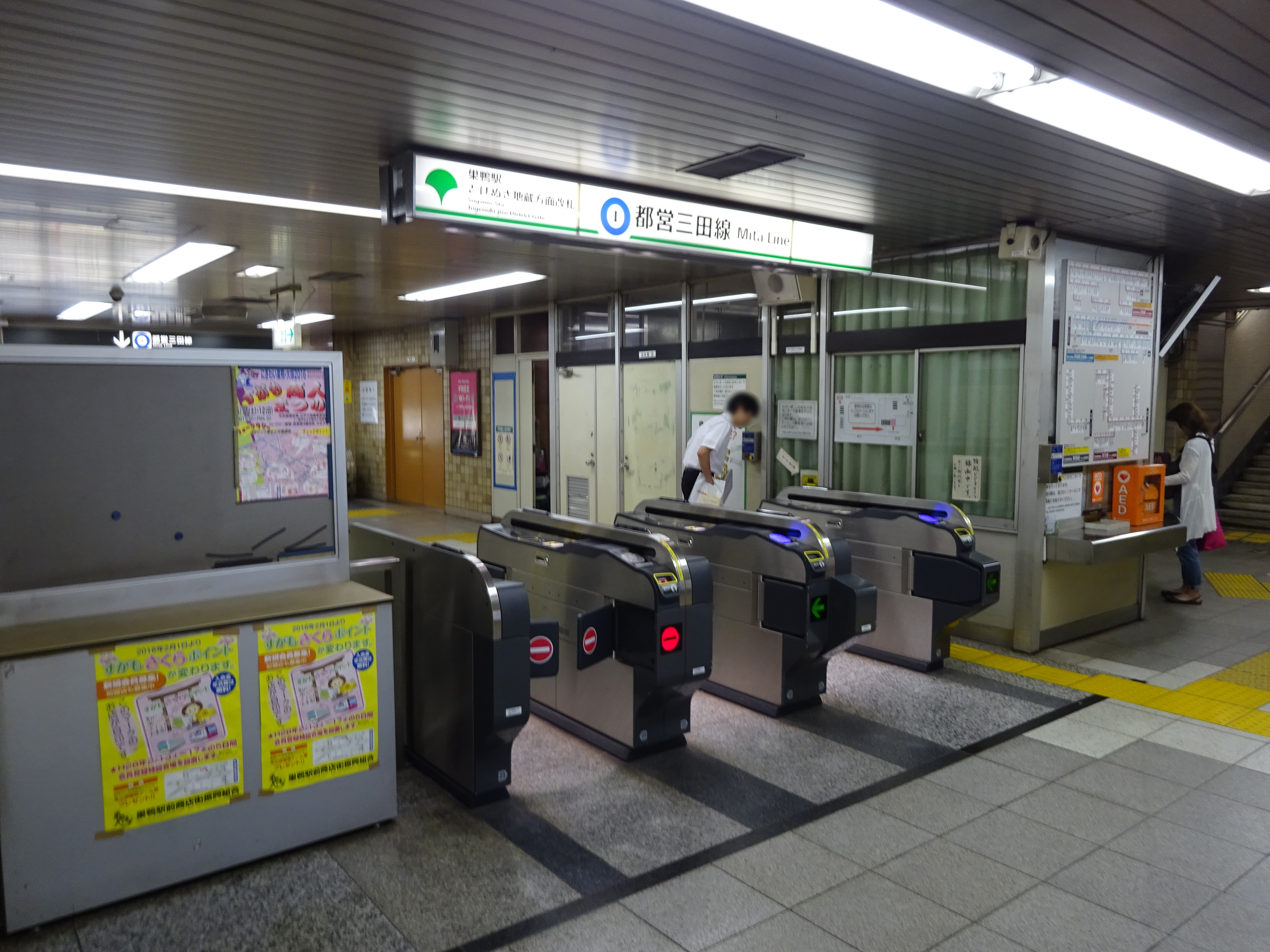
Toei ticket gates

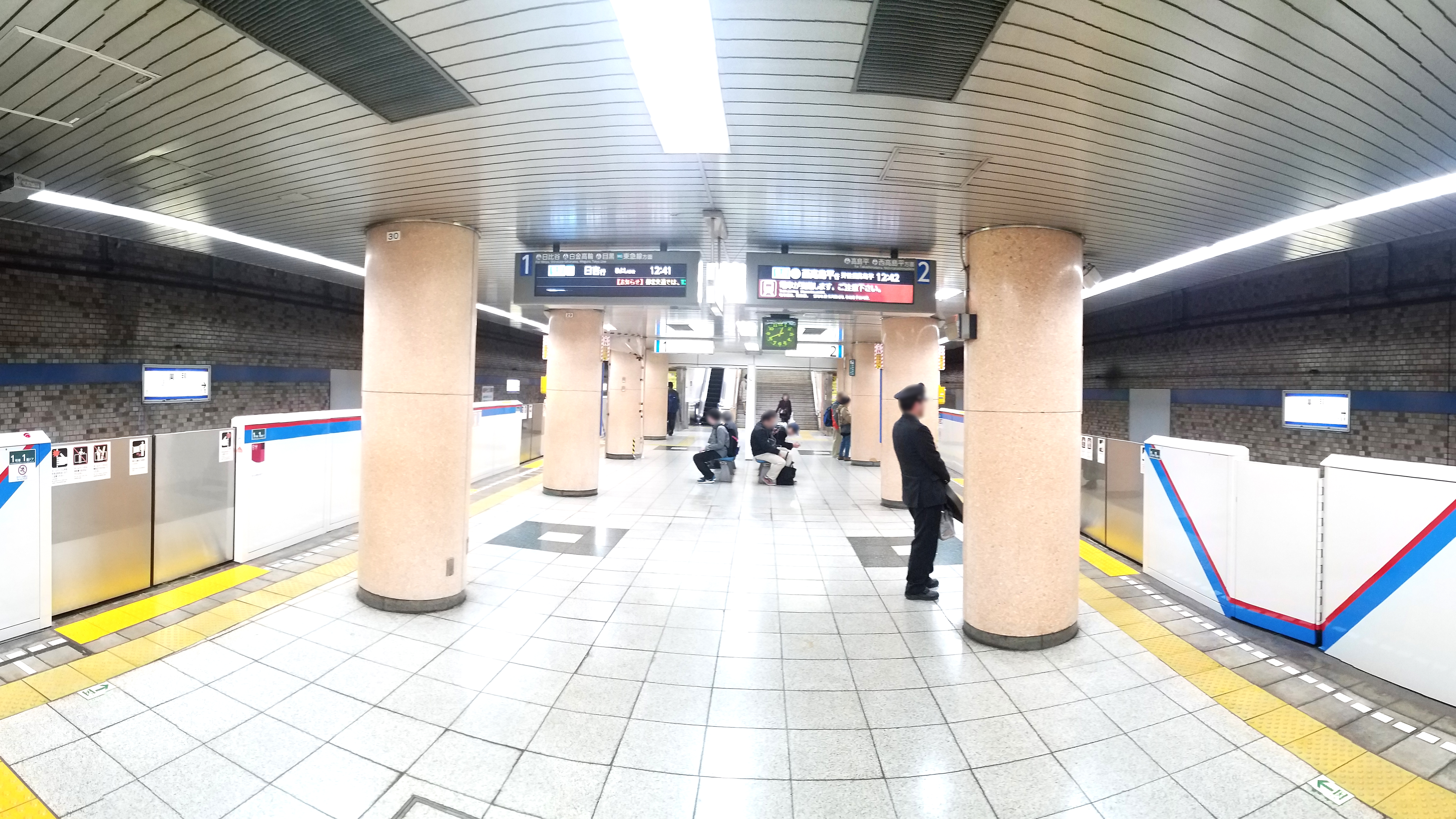
Mita Line platform

== History ==
The station opened on 1 April 1903.

Station numbering was introduced in 2016 with Sugamo being assigned station number JY11.

== Passenger statistics ==
In fiscal 2013, the JR East station was used by an average of 77,089 passengers daily (boarding passengers only), making it the 57th-busiest station operated by JR East. In fiscal 2013, the Toei station was used by an average of 46,241 passengers daily (boarding passengers only). The daily average passenger figures (boarding passengers only) for JR East in previous years are as shown below.

Fiscal year	Daily average
2000	81,818
2005	76,739
2010	77,457
2011	76,093
2012	76,249
2013	77,089

== Surrounding area ==
To the north of the station is a long shopping street, Jizō-dōri (地蔵通り), which is popular with older ladies, and the area is known as "Harajuku for Grannies".

== See also ==
- List of railway stations in Japan
