= 6000 series =

6000 series may refer to:

== Computers ==
- CDC 6000 series mainframe computer manufactured by Control Data Corporation
- Honeywell 6000 series mainframe computer manufactured by Honeywell
- PC-6000 series of consumer-grade personal computers manufactured by NEC
- Radeon HD 6000 series graphics processing units produced by AMD
- Radeon RX 6000 series graphics processing units produced by AMD

== Japanese train types ==
- Chichibu Railway 6000 series
- Fujikyu 6000 series
- Hankyu 6000 series
- JR Shikoku 6000 series
- Keihan 6000 series, operated by Keihan Electric Railway
- Keio 6000 series
- Kintetsu 6000 series, operated by Kintetsu Railway
- Kumamoto Electric Railway 6000 series, formerly operated by Toei Transportation
- Kobe Municipal Subway 6000 series
- Meitetsu 6000 series
- Nagoya Municipal Subway 6000 series
- Nankai 6000 series, operated by Nankai Electric Railway
- Nishitetsu 6000 series, operated by Nishi-Nippon Railroad
- Sanyo 6000 series
- Sapporo Municipal Subway 6000 series
- Seibu 6000 series
- Shintetsu 6000 series
- Sotetsu 6000 series
- Tobu 6000 series, operated by Tobu Railway
- Toei 6000 series
- Tokyo Metro 6000 series
- Tokyu 6000 series

== Other train types ==
- 6000 series (Chicago "L")
- Seoul Metro 6000 series
