= 6500 series =

6500 series may refer to:

== Japanese train types ==
- Meitetsu 6500 series electric multiple unit operating for Nagoya Railroad
- Shintetsu 6500 series electric multiple unit operating for Kobe Electric Railway (Shinetsu)
- Toei 6500 series electric multiple unit operating for Toei Transportation
