= 600 (disambiguation) =

600 may refer to:

== In general ==
- 600 (number), a number in the 600s range
- AD 600 (DC), a year of the Common Era
- 600 BC, a year Before the Common Era

== Products ==
- .600 Overkill, a hunting cartridge designed to fit the CZ-550 action
- CFR-600, a sodium-cooled pool-type fast-neutron nuclear reactor under construction in Xiapu County, Fujian
- FBR-600, a 600-MWe fast breeder nuclear reactor design
- Fort-600, a 40 mm stand-alone grenade launcher
- Treo 600, a smartphone developed by Handspring
- S&P 600, a stock market index established by S&P Global Ratings
- Amiga 600, a home computer

=== Vehicles ===
- DAF 600, a small family car
- Dodge 600, a mid-size car
- Embraer Legacy 600, a business jet derivative of the Embraer ERJ family of commercial jet aircraft
- Fiat 600, a city car
  - Fiat 600 (2023), a sport utility vehicle
  - SEAT 600, a license-built version of the Fiat 600 manufactured by SEAT
- Lloyd 600, a supermini car
- Mercedes-Benz 600, an ultra-luxury car
- Saab-Lancia 600, a hatchback
- Tatra 600, a large family car

== Other uses ==
- 600 AM, an AM radio frequency
- 600 metres, a rarely run middle-distance running event in track and field competitions
- Coca-Cola 600, originally World 600, an annual 600-mile (970 km) NASCAR Cup Series points race held at the Charlotte Motor Speedway in Concord, North Carolina
- RATAN-600, a radio telescope in Zelenchukskaya, Karachay–Cherkess Republic, Russia

== See also ==
- 600s (disambiguation)
- 6000 (disambiguation)
- 60 (disambiguation)
- 6 (disambiguation)
- DC (disambiguation) (Latin: DC, lit. '600')
