= 6000 =

6000 may refer to:

- 6000 (number) and the 6000s
- The last year of the 6th millennium, a century leap year starting on Saturday
- The Hebrew Year 6000, in the Gregorian 3rd millennium (from 29 September 2239 to 16 September 2240)
- 6000 List, the Anti-Corruption Foundation initiative related to 2022 Russian invasion of Ukraine
- Pontiac 6000, a mid-sized car produced by General Motors

== See also ==
- 6000 series (disambiguation)
