= Chichibu Railway 5000 series =

Japanese train type

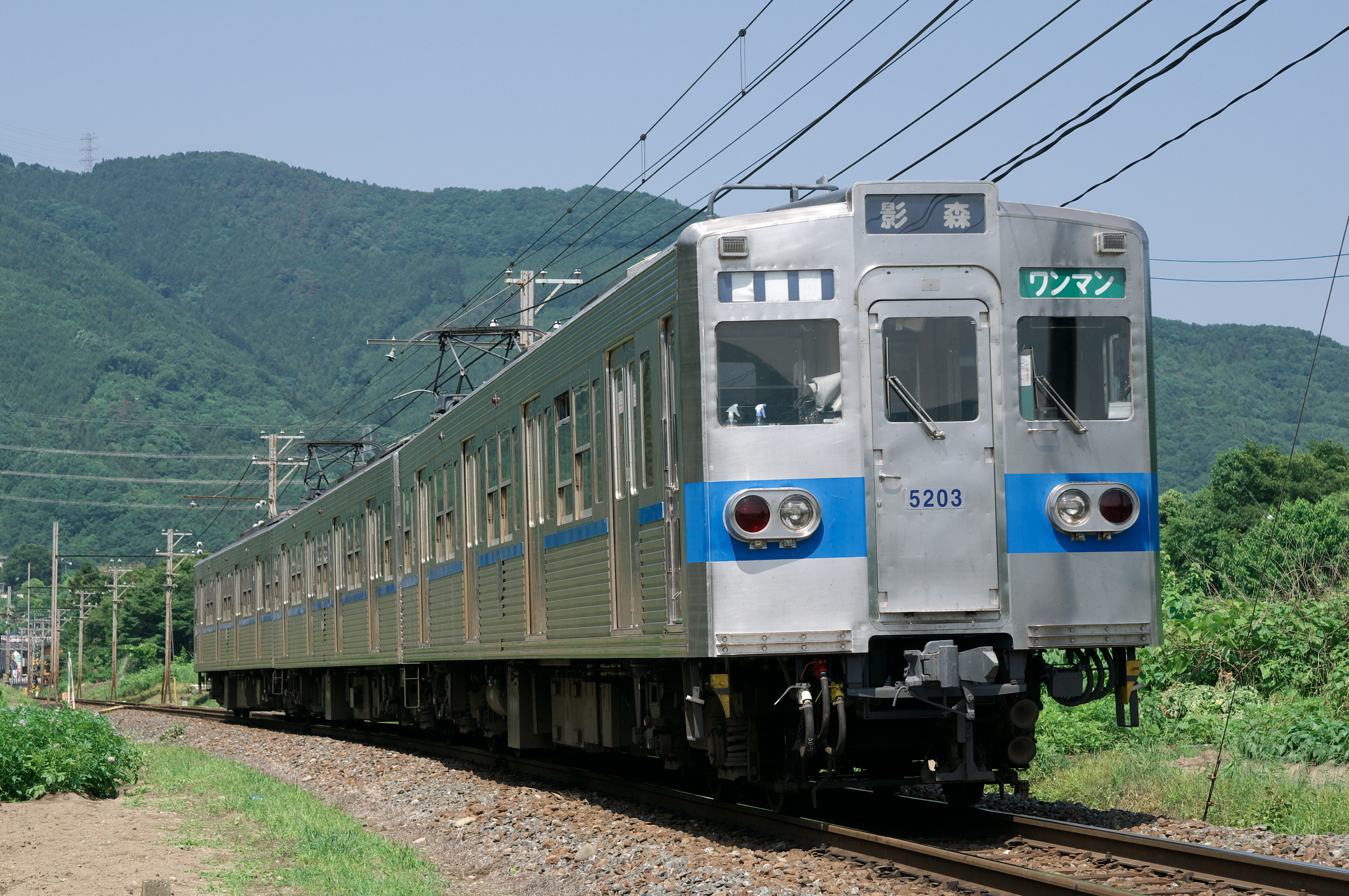
- Set 5003, June 2011
- In service: 1999–
- Replaced: 2000 series
- Number built: 12 vehicles (4 sets)
- Number in service: 9 vehicles (3 sets)
- Number scrapped: 3 vehicles (1 set)
- Formation: 3 cars per trainset
- Operator: Chichibu Railway
- Depot: Kumagaya
- Line served: Chichibu Main Line

Specifications
- Car body construction: Stainless steel
- Car length: 20 m (65 ft 7 in)
- Doors: 4 pairs per side
- Electric system: 1,500 V DC
- Current collection: Overhead wire
- Track gauge: 1,067 mm (3 ft 6 in)

The Chichibu Railway 5000 series (秩父鉄道5000系) is an electric multiple unit (EMU) train type operated by the private railway operator Chichibu Railway on Chichibu Main Line local services in Japan.

== Fleet details ==
As of 1 April 2014, three three-car sets (sets 5001 to 5003) were in service.

DeHa (M1c)	DeHa (M2)	KuHa (Tc)
5001 (ex 6191)	5101 (ex 6196)	5201 (ex 6198)
5002 (ex 6241)	5102 (ex 6246)	5202 (ex 6248)
5003 (ex 6251)	5103 (ex 6256)	5203 (ex 6258)
5004 (ex 6261)	5104 (ex 6266)	5204 (ex 6268)

The DeHa 5000 and 5100 cars are each fitted with one lozenge-type pantograph.

== History ==
Four 3-car trains were converted in 1999 from former Toei 6000 series (Toei Mita Line) commuter EMUs.
