= Toei 6300 series =

Japanese train type

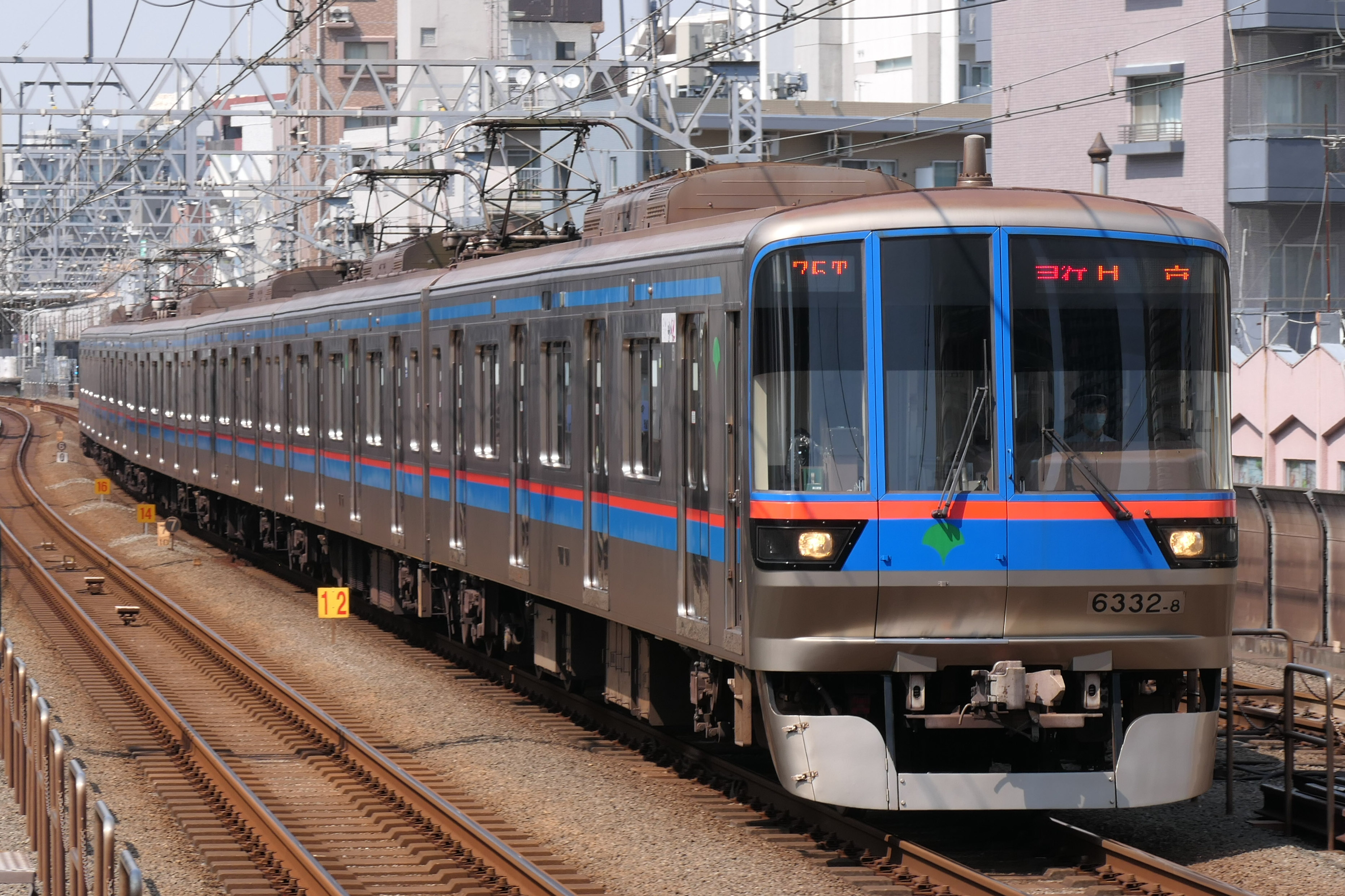
- Set 6332 in June 2021
- Manufacturers: Kawasaki Heavy Industries and Kinki Sharyo
- Replaced: Toei 6000 series
- Constructed: 1993-2000
- Entered service: 23 June 1993
- Scrapped: 2022 -
- Number built: 222 vehicles (37 sets)
- Number in service: 144 vehicles (24 sets)
- Number scrapped: 30 vehicles (5 sets)
- Successor: Toei 6500 series
- Formation: 6 cars per set
- Fleet numbers: 6301-6337
- Operator: Toei Subway
- Depot: Shimura
- Lines served: Toei Mita Line, Tokyu Meguro Line, Tōkyū Shin-yokohama Line

Specifications
- Car body construction: Stainless steel
- Car length: 20.250 m (66 ft 5 in) (end cars); 20.000 m (65 ft 7 in) (intermediate cars)
- Width: 2,783 mm (9 ft 1.6 in)
- Height: 4,045 mm (13 ft 3.3 in), with pantograph: 4,125 mm (13 ft 6.4 in)
- Doors: 4 pairs per side
- Wheel diameter: 860 mm (33.86 in)
- Wheelbase: 2,100 mm (83 in)
- Maximum speed: 120 km/h (75 mph)
- Weight: 183.0 t (180.1 long tons; 201.7 short tons) (1st batch)
- Traction system: Variable frequency (GTO/IGBT)
- Power output: 180 kW (240 hp)
- Acceleration: 3.5 km/(h⋅s) (2.2 mph/s)
- Deceleration: 4.0 km/(h⋅s) (2.5 mph/s) (service), 4.5 km/(h⋅s) (2.8 mph/s) (emergency)
- Electric system: 1,500 V DC Overhead wire
- Current collection: Pantograph
- Bogies: KD-308, KD-308A
- Braking systems: Electronically controlled pneumatic brakes, regenerative braking
- Safety systems: CS-ATC, ATO, ATC-P, TASC
- Coupling system: Janney coupler
- Track gauge: 1,067 mm (3 ft 6 in)

The Toei 6300 series (都営6300形, Toei 6300-gata) is an electric multiple unit (EMU) commuter train type operated by the Tokyo Metropolitan Bureau of Transportation (Toei) on the Toei Mita Line in Tokyo, Japan. Introduced into service on 23 June 1993, a total of 37 six-car trainsets (222 vehicles) were built by Kawasaki Heavy Industries and Kinki Sharyo between 1993 and 2000 to replace the non-air-conditioned Toei 6000 series.

== Formations ==
The fleet consists of 37 six-car sets formed as shown below, with car 1 at the Nishi-Takashimadaira end.

Car No.	1	2	3	4	5	6
Designation	Tc1	M1	M2	T1	M1	Tc2
Numbering	63xx-1	63xx-2	63xx-3	63xx-4	63xx-5	63xx-6
Capacity (seated/total)	49/136	55/147				49/136

Cars 2 and 5 are each fitted with two lozenge-type pantographs.

== Interior ==
Seating consists of longitudinal bench seating with sculpted seat cushions, and 4-seat transverse bays are provided at the ends of cars.

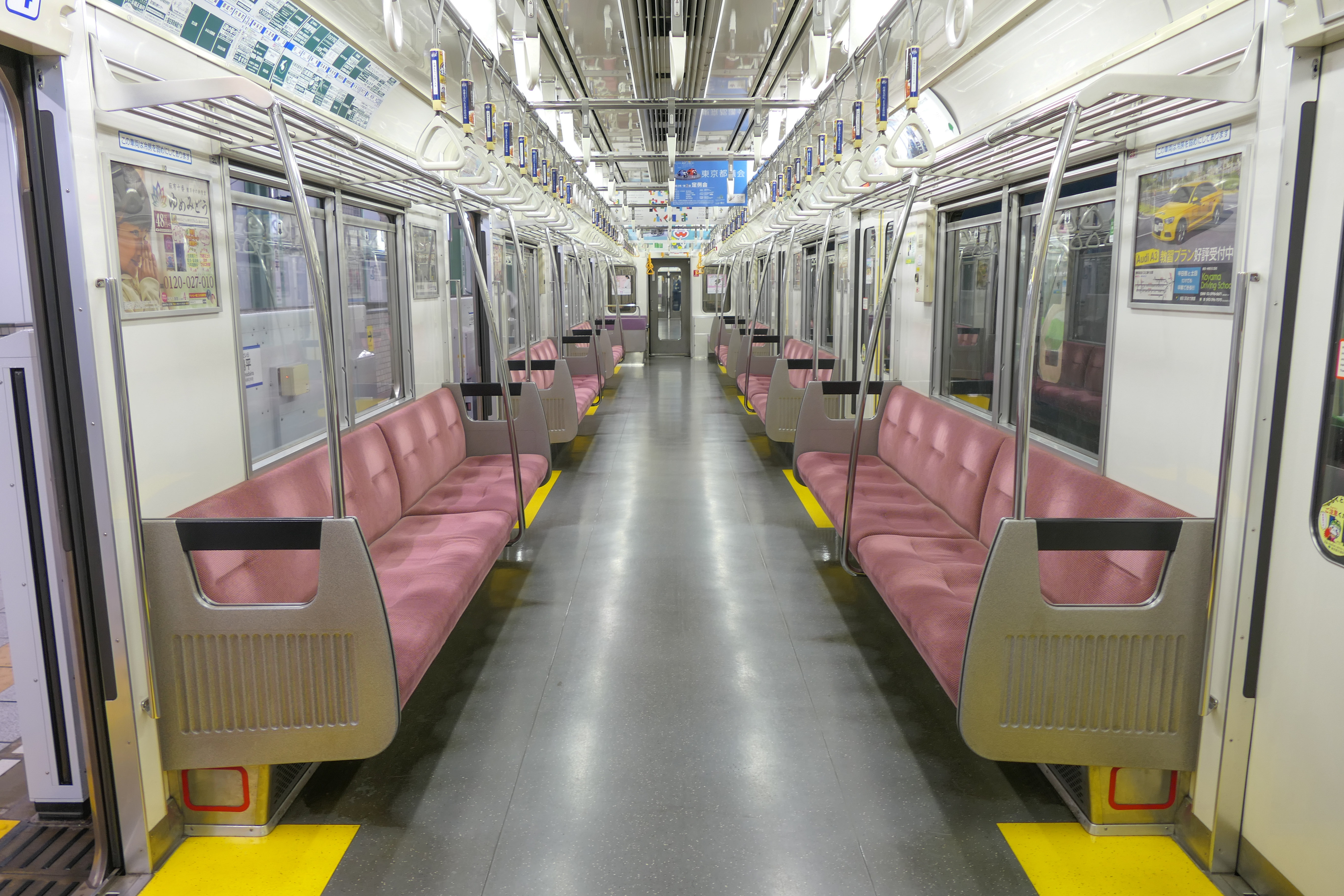
Interior of a first-second batch 6300 series

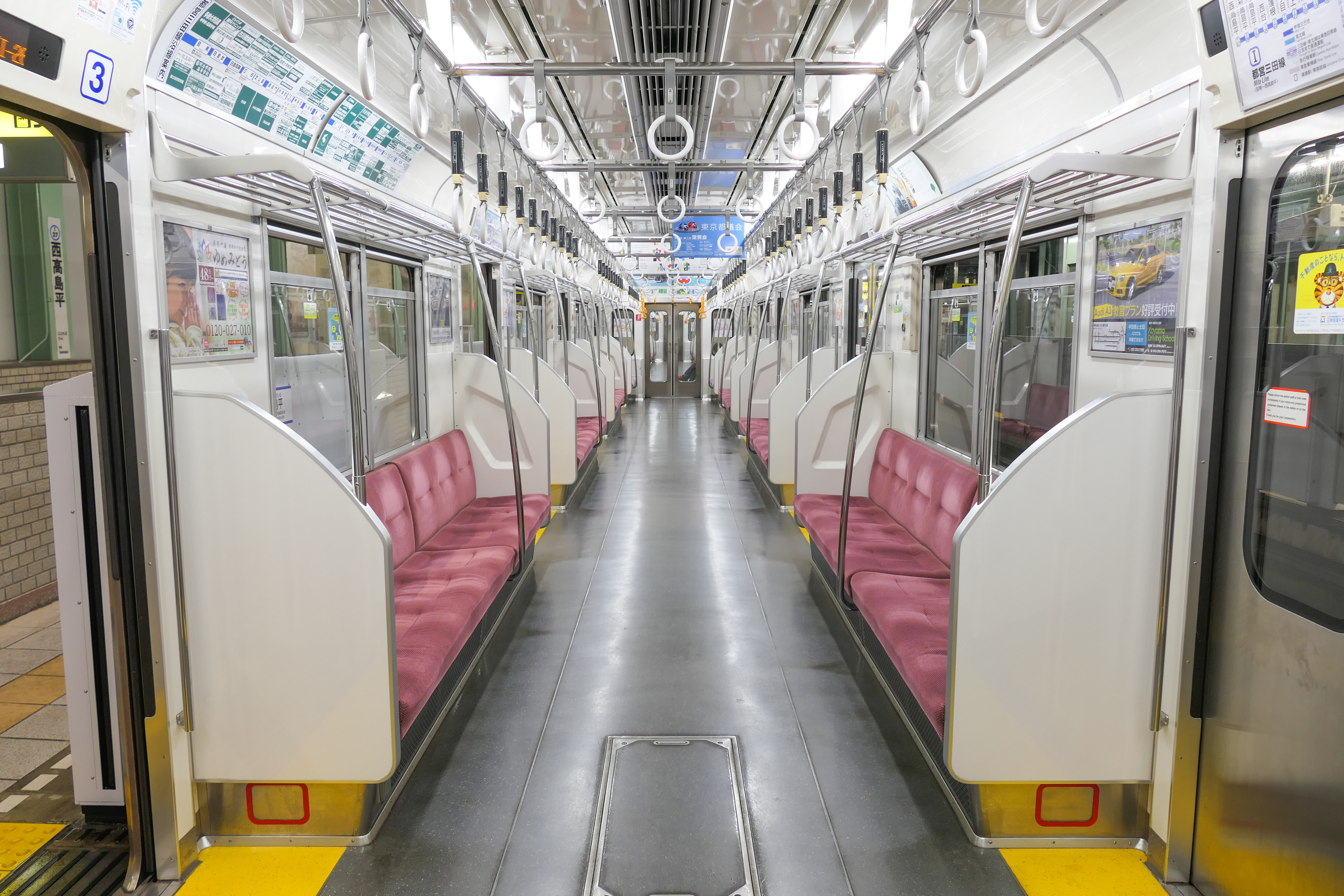
Interior of a third batch 6300 series

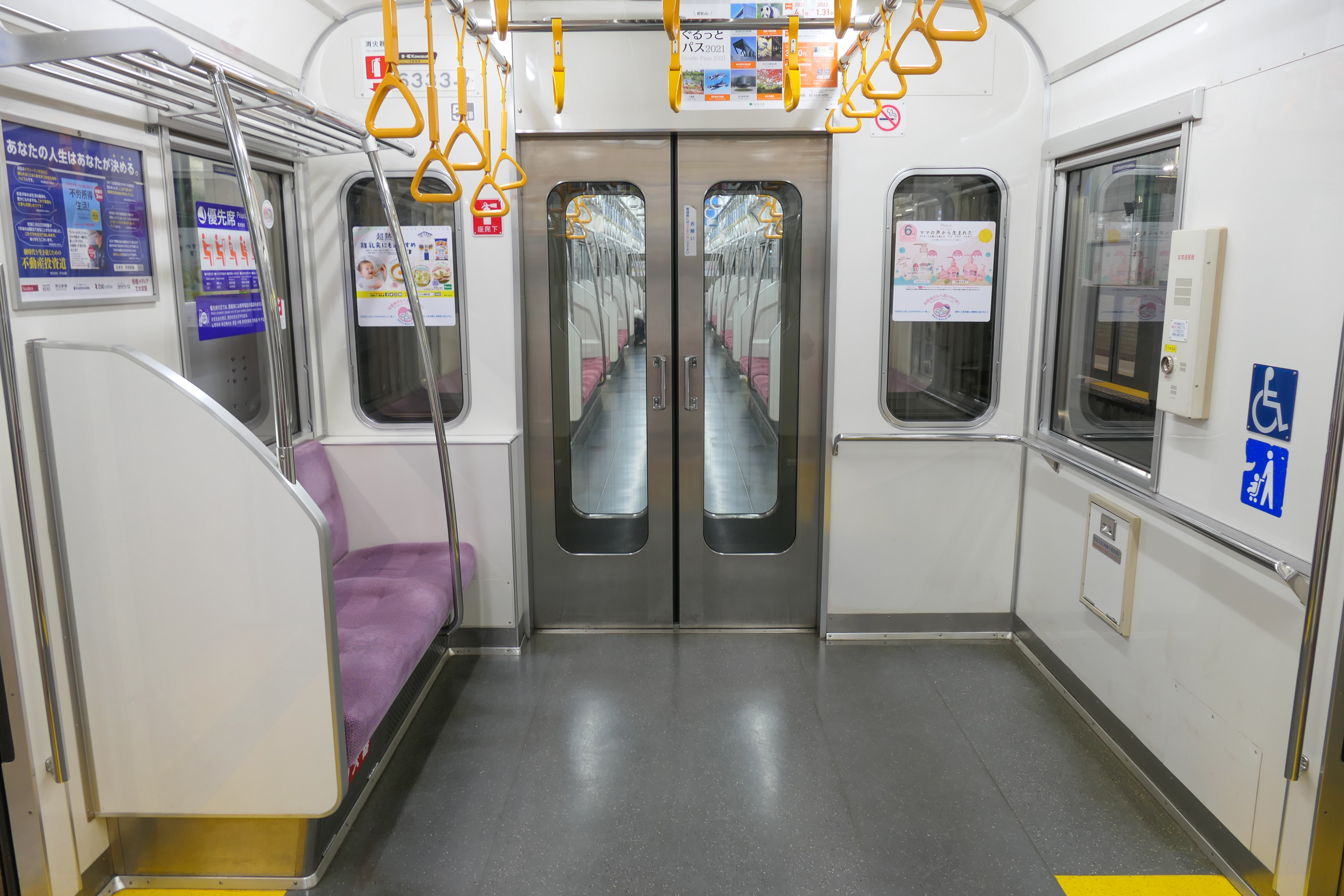
Wheelchair space on the 6300 series

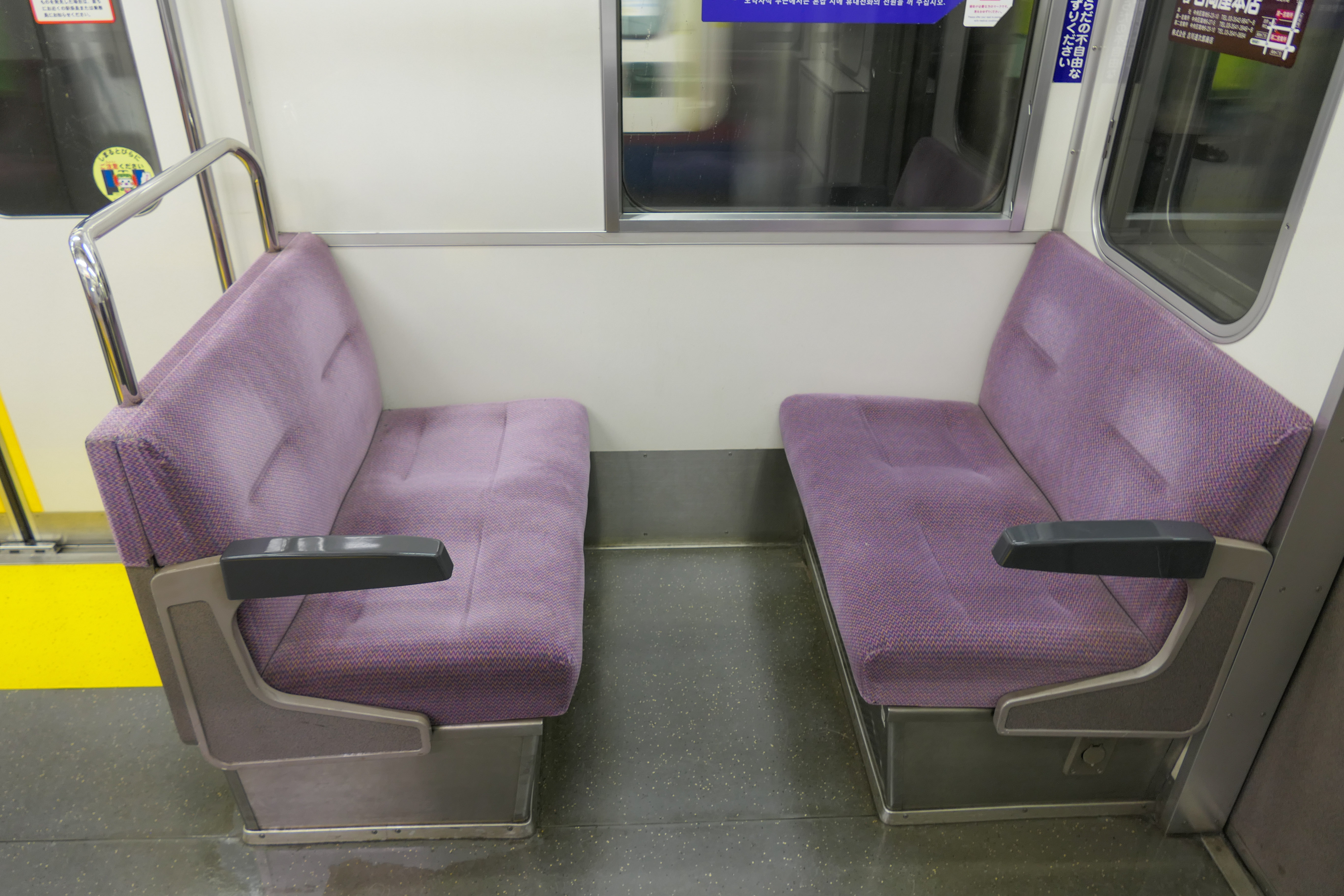
Transverse seating on board a first-second batch 6300 series train

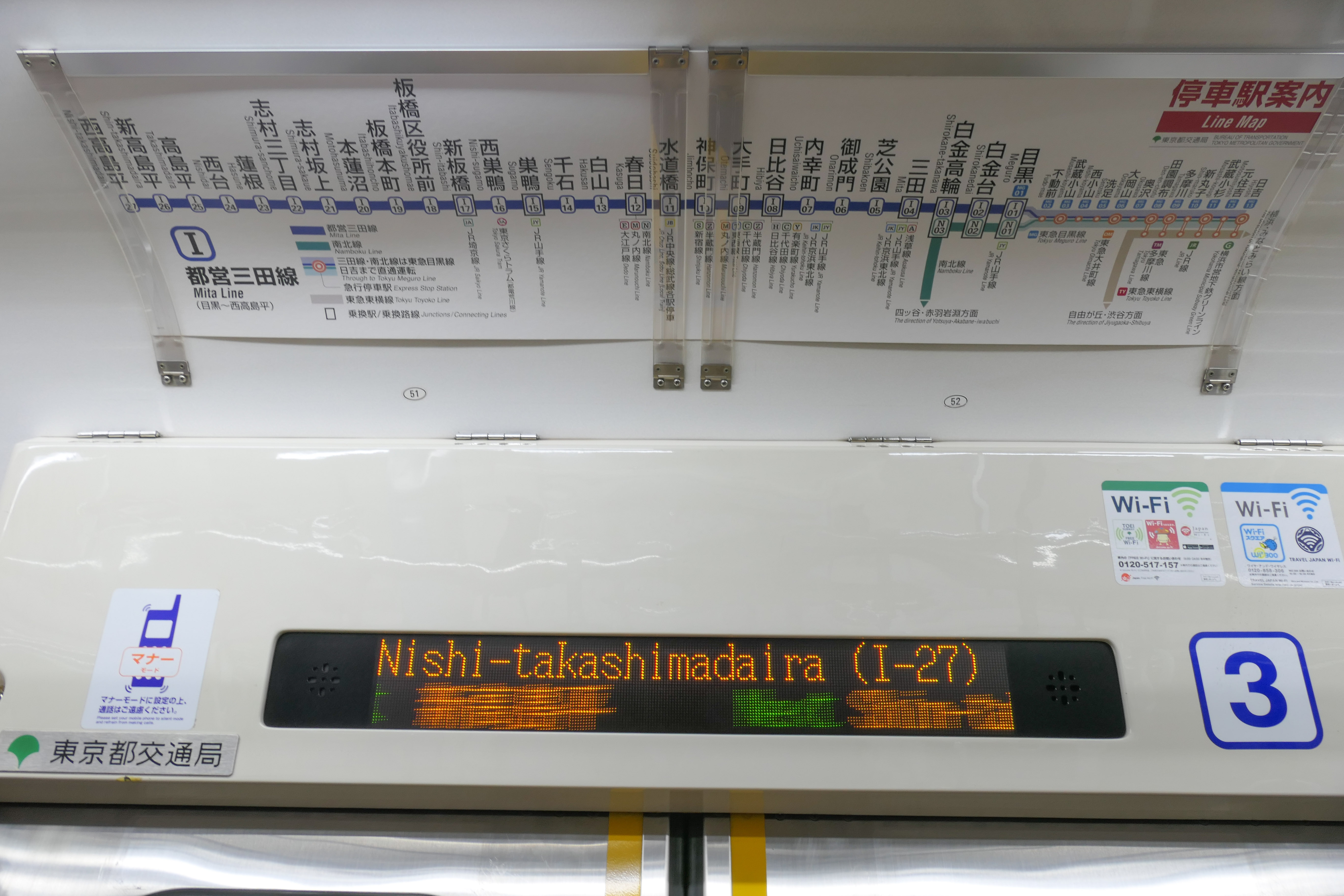
Route map above the doors of the 6300 series

== History ==
The first sets were delivered in May 1993, and entered revenue service from 23 June of the same year; the original purpose of the Toei 6300 series was to replace the non-air-conditioned Toei 6000 series. In 2000, the third batch of the 6300 series was delivered for through-service operations into the Tōkyū Meguro Line as it was more economical to replace the remaining 6000 series units than to modify them. With the installation of a new digital radio system for the Toyoko and Meguro Lines, all remaining first and second batches were retired early from service in late October 2022.

== Future ==
Toei plans to replace the first and second batches of the fleet with new 6500 series 8-car sets from 14 May 2022. The third batch will remain in service, however Toei had expressed interest in completely replacing the entire fleet with new 6500 trainsets as extending the remaining sets to eight car formations and updating them to be compatible with future through running service on the Sotetsu line via the Shin-Yokohama line would be rather costly. For the time being, the third batch sets will only provide service as far as Shin-Yokohama and remain as six car sets.

== Gallery ==
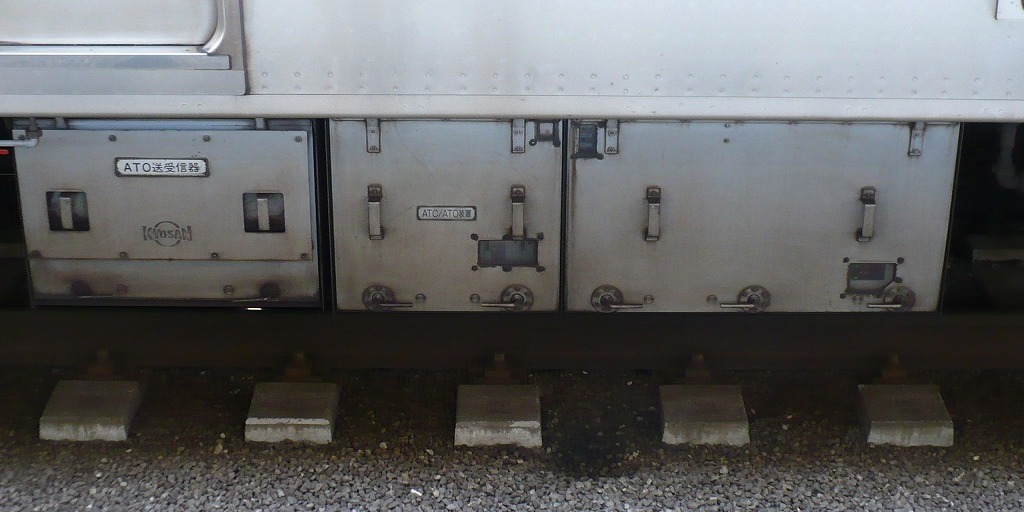
ATO unit as used on the 6300 series

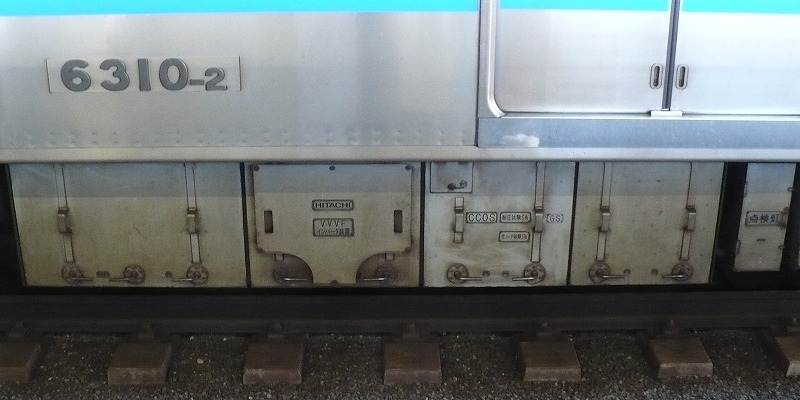
Hitachi GTO-VVVF as used on the first two batches of the 6300 series

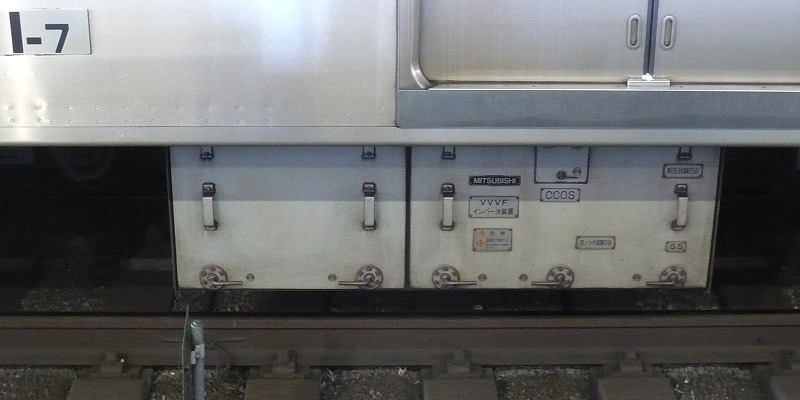
Mitsubishi IGBT-VVVF as used on the third batch

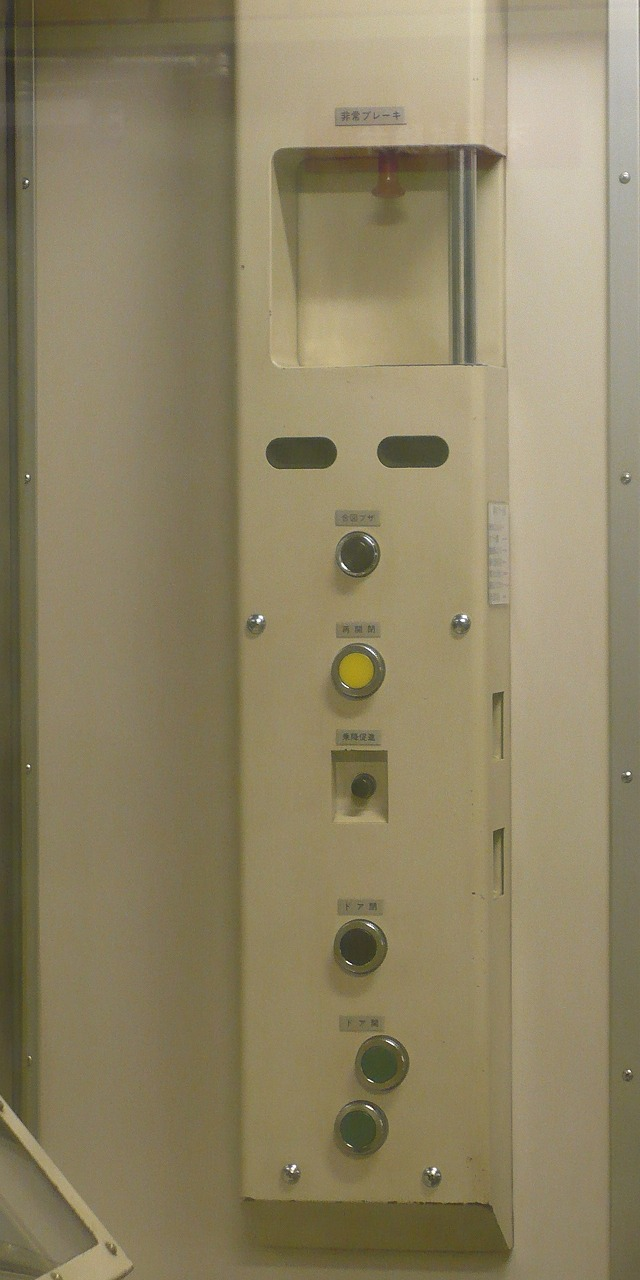
Conductor's panel on the 6300 series

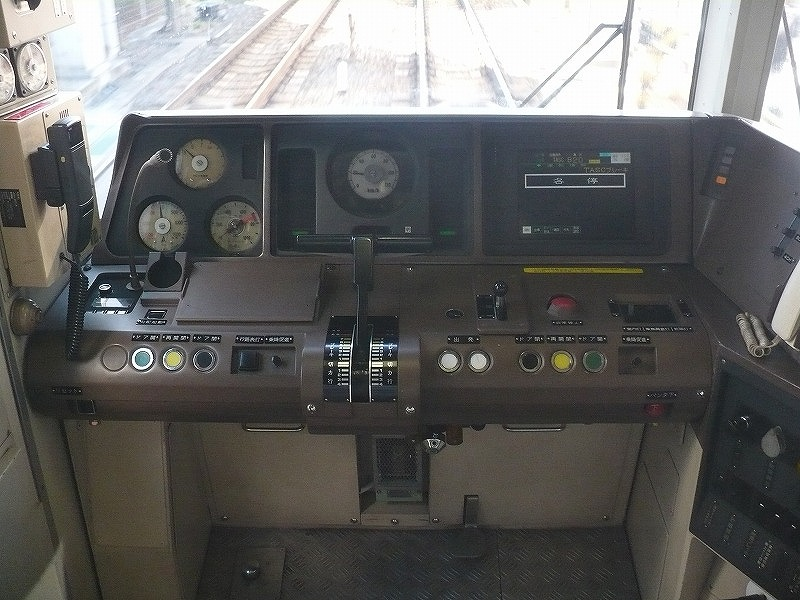
Driver cab of the 6300 series
