= Nishitetsu 6000 series =

Japanese train type

Nishitetsu 6000 and 6050 series
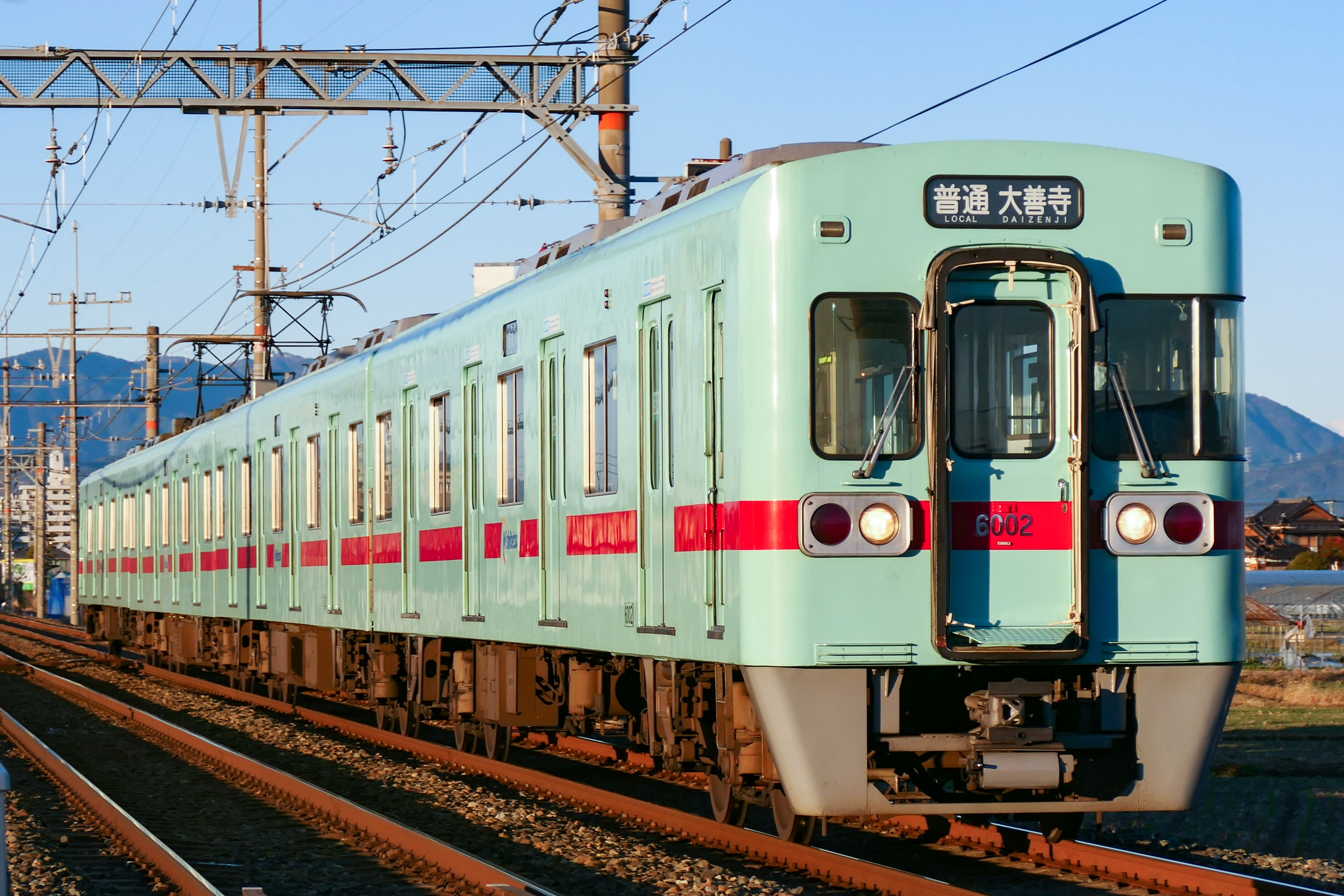
- A 6000 series train in 2023
- In service: 1993–present
- Manufacturer: Kawasaki Heavy Industries
- Constructed: 1993–1995
- Entered service: May 1993
- Number built: 6000 series: 33 vehicles (9 sets); 6050 series: 26 vehicles (7 sets)
- Number in service: 6000 series: 33 vehicles (9 sets); 6050 series: 25 vehicles (7 sets)
- Number scrapped: 6050 series: 1 vehicle
- Formation: 3 or 4 cars
- Fleet numbers: 132 per end car; 146 per intermediate car
- Capacity: 310 per 3-car set; 456 per 4-car set
- Operators: Nishitetsu
- Lines served: Tenjin Ōmuta Line; Dazaifu Line; Amagi Line

Specifications
- Car length: 19,500 mm (64 ft 0 in)
- Width: 2,716 mm (8 ft 10.9 in)
- Height: 4,016 mm (13 ft 2.1 in)
- Doors: 4 pairs per side
- Traction system: 6000 series: Resistor control; 6050 series: Variable frequency (GTO, IGBT)
- Traction motors: 6000 series: 4 × 135 kW (181 hp) 3-phase AC induction motor per powered car; 6050 series: 4 × 165 kW (221 hp) 3-phase AC induction motor per powered car
- Electric system(s): 1,500 V DC overhead catenary
- Current collector(s): Pantograph
- Track gauge: 1,435 mm (4 ft 8 1/2 in)

The Nishitetsu 6000 series (西鉄6000形) is an electric multiple unit (EMU) train type operated by the private railway operator Nishitetsu in Japan since 1993.

Cars delivered with VVVF inverters in 1995 are designated as 6050 series.

== 6000 series ==
6000 series trains are formed as follows, with three or four cars per set.

Nine sets are on the active roster.

=== Four-car sets ===
Car	Tc1	M1	M2	Tc2
Numbering	6000	6200	6300	6500
Capacity	132	146		132

=== Three-car sets ===
Car	Mc1	T	Mc2
Numbering	6700	6900	6800
Capacity	132	146	132

== 6050 series ==
6050 series trains are formed as follows, with three or four cars per set.

Seven sets are on the active roster.

=== Four-car sets ===
Car	Tc1	M1	M2	Tc2
Numbering	6050	6250	6350	6550
Capacity	132	146		132

=== Three-car sets ===
Car	Tc1	M	Tc2
Numbering	6750	6950	6850
Capacity	132	146	132

== Interior ==
Seating consists of longitudinal seating throughout.

== History ==
A total of 16 sets (59 vehicles) were delivered in 3-car and 4-car sets between 1993 and 1995.

=== Refurbishment ===
The seven 6050 series sets underwent a refurbishment programme between 2016 and 2019.

== The Rail Kitchen Chikugo ==
The Rail Kitchen Chikugo (stylized as THE RAIL KITCHEN CHIKUGO) is a sightseeing train which runs on the Tenjin Ōmuta line. It features an onboard restaurant featuring various dishes and local delicacies.

The train is formed from 6050 series set 6053. During refurbishment, this 4-car set was reformed into a 3-car set with spare intermediate car 6253 being scrapped. Operations of The Rail Kitchen Chikugo began on 24 March 2019.

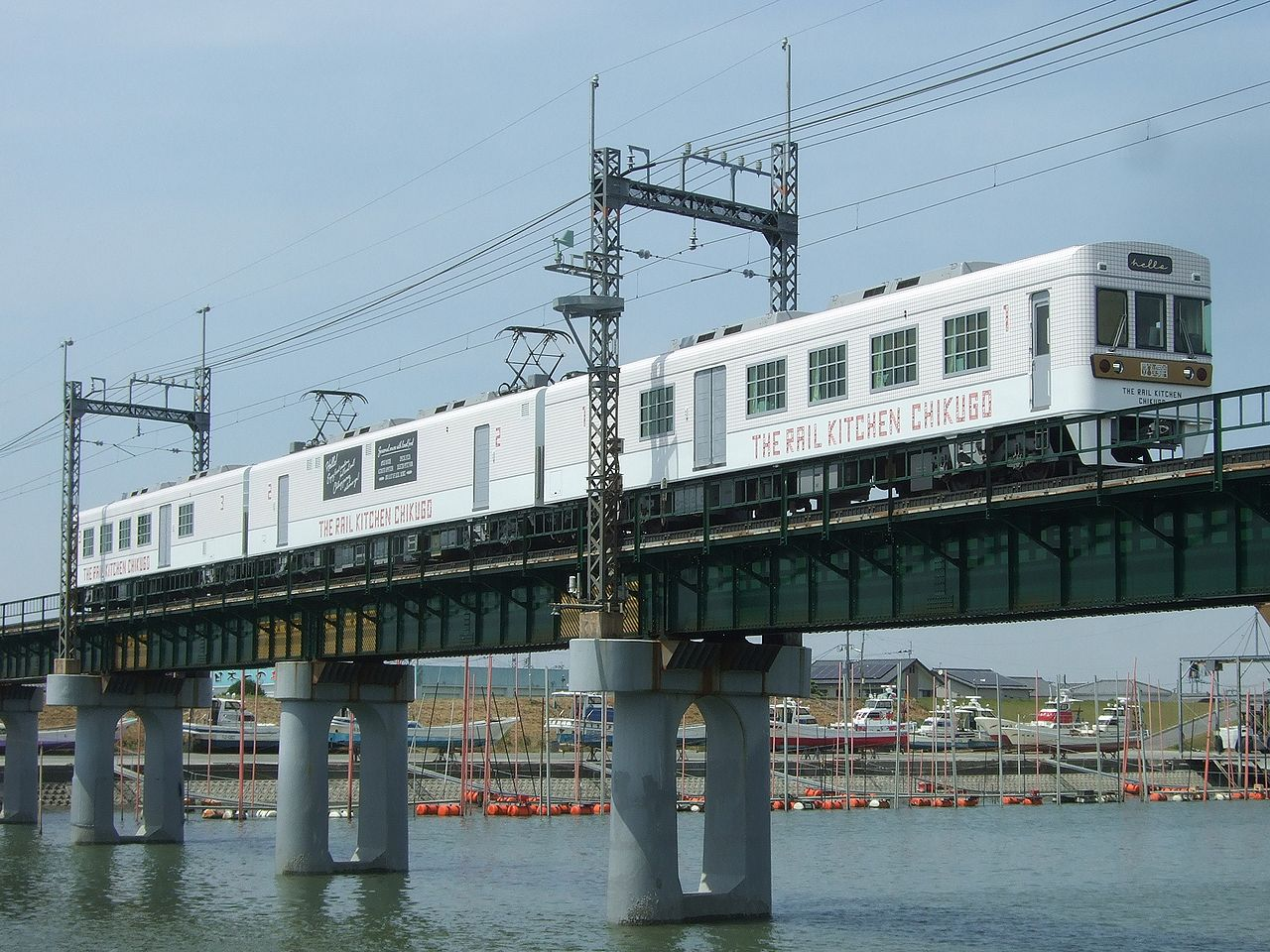
The Rail Kitchen Chikugo
