= Shintetsu 6000 series =

Japanese train type

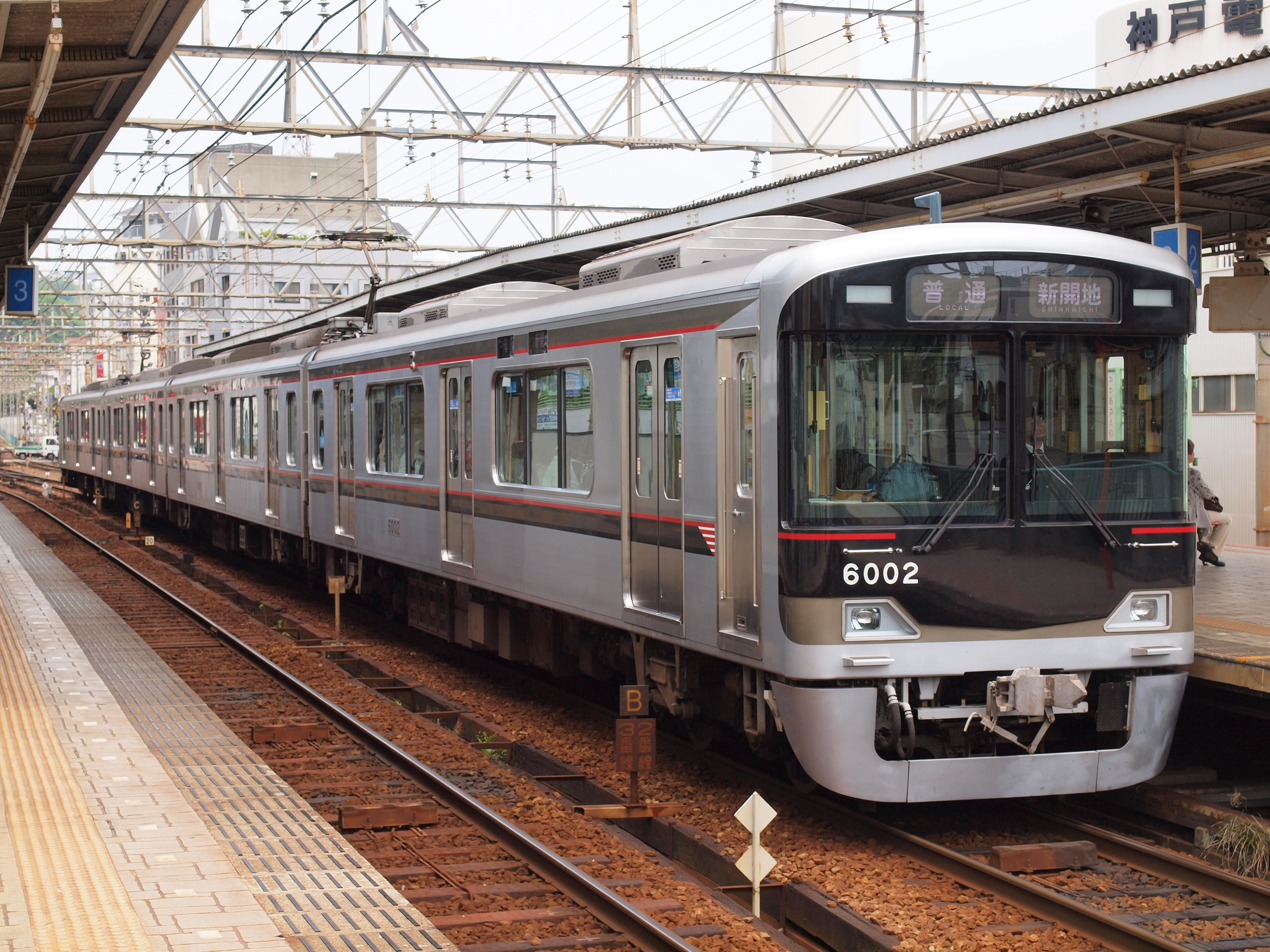
- Shintetsu 6000 series, May 2009
- In service: June 2008 – present
- Manufacturer: Kawasaki Heavy Industries
- Replaced: 1000 series
- Number built: 8 vehicles (2 sets)
- Number in service: 8 vehicles (2 sets)
- Formation: 4 cars per trainset
- Fleet numbers: 6001–6003
- Capacity: 476 per 4-car set (152 seated)
- Operators: Kobe Electric Railway

Specifications
- Car body construction: Stainless steel
- Car length: 18,290 mm (60 ft 0 in)
- Width: 2,700 mm (8 ft 10 in)
- Height: 4,030 mm (13 ft 3 in)
- Doors: 3 pairs per side
- Maximum speed: 80 km/h (50 mph) (service); 100 km/h (62 mph) (design)
- Traction system: Variable frequency (2-level IGBT)
- Power output: 120 kW x 4 per car
- Acceleration: 3.0 km/(h⋅s) (1.9 mph/s)
- Deceleration: 3.3 km/(h⋅s) (2.1 mph/s)
- Electric system(s): 1,500 V DC
- Current collection: Overhead line
- Track gauge: 1,067 mm (3 ft 6 in)

The Shintetsu 6000 series (神戸電鉄6000系, Kōbe Dentetsu 6000-kei) is an electric multiple unit (EMU) train type operated by the private railway operator Kobe Electric Railway (Shintetsu) in Japan since 2008.

== Design ==
It was the first new type ordered by the company in 14 years and also the first type with stainless steel bodies. The 18 m long cars have three pairs of doors per side and longitudinal bench seating throughout.

== Formation ==
As of 1 April 2014, the fleet consisted of two four-car sets formed as follows.

Designation	Mc1	M2	M1	Mc2
Numbering	6000	6100	6100	6000

The Mc1 and M1 cars each have one single-arm pantograph.

== Interior ==
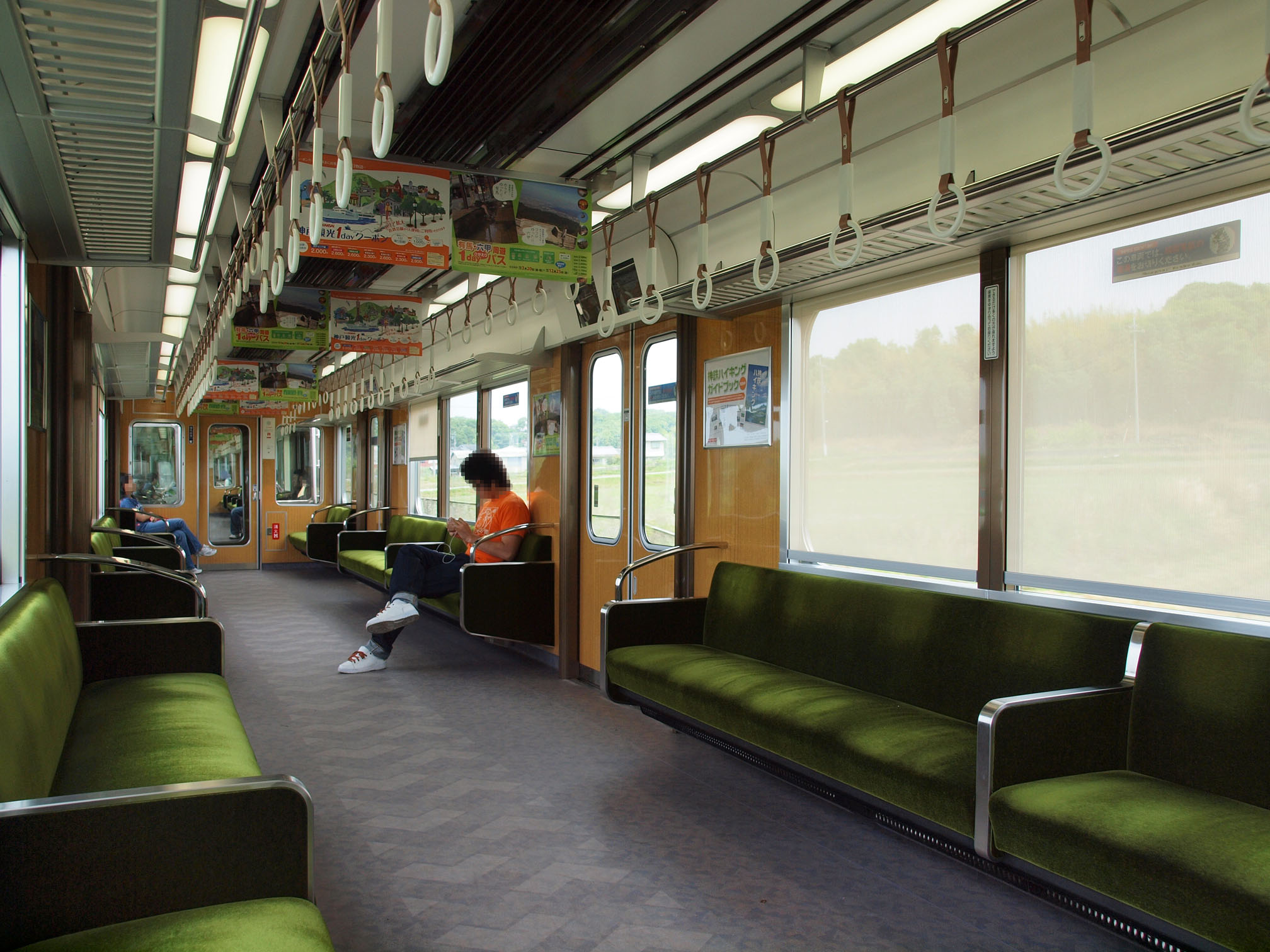
Interior view, May 2009

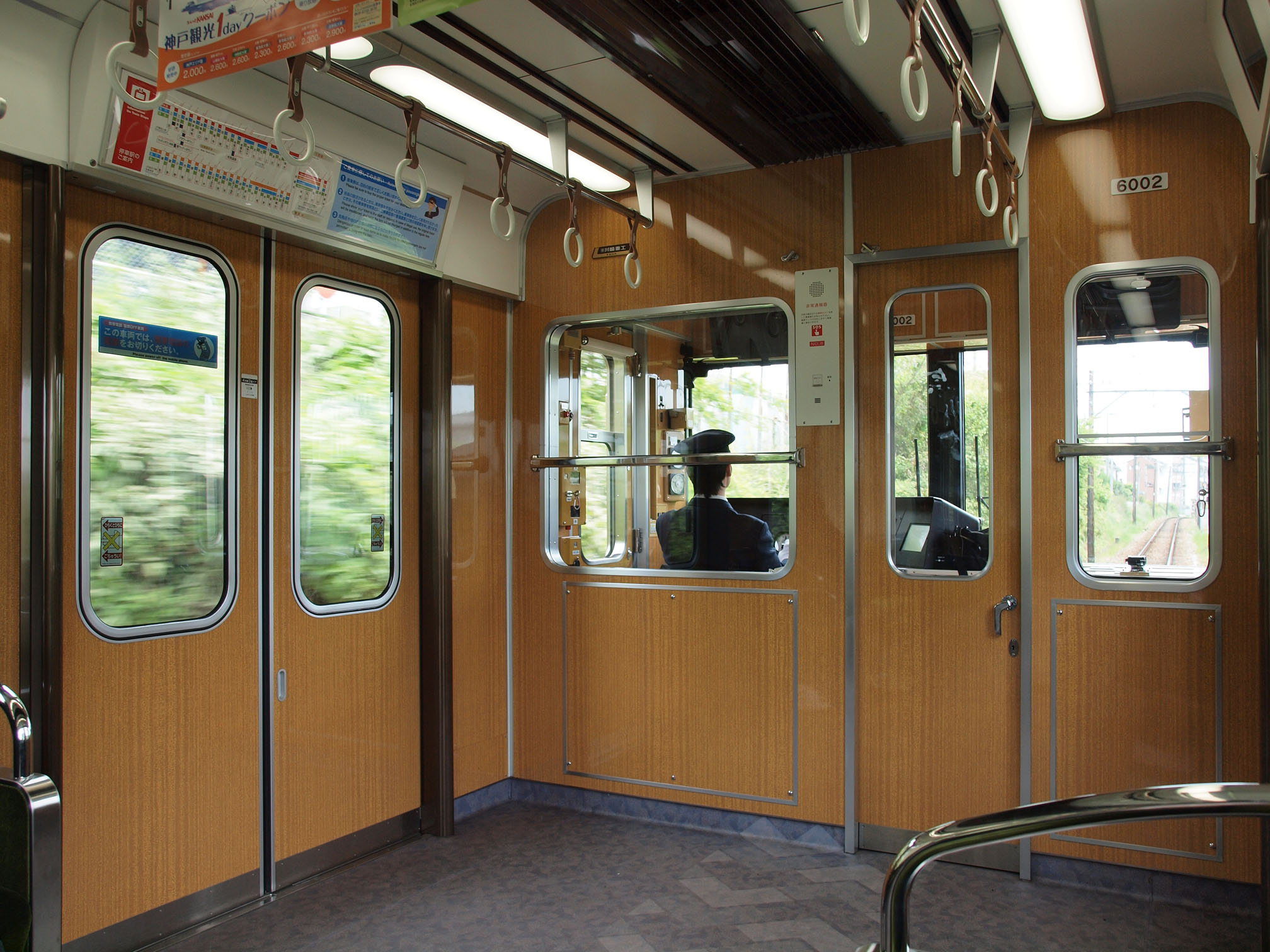
Interior view, May 2009

== History ==
The first set, 6001, was delivered in 2008, and entered revenue-earning service on 4 June 2008.

== See also ==
- Shintetsu 6500 series, 3-car sets based on the 6000 series design
