= Shintetsu 6500 series =

Japanese train type

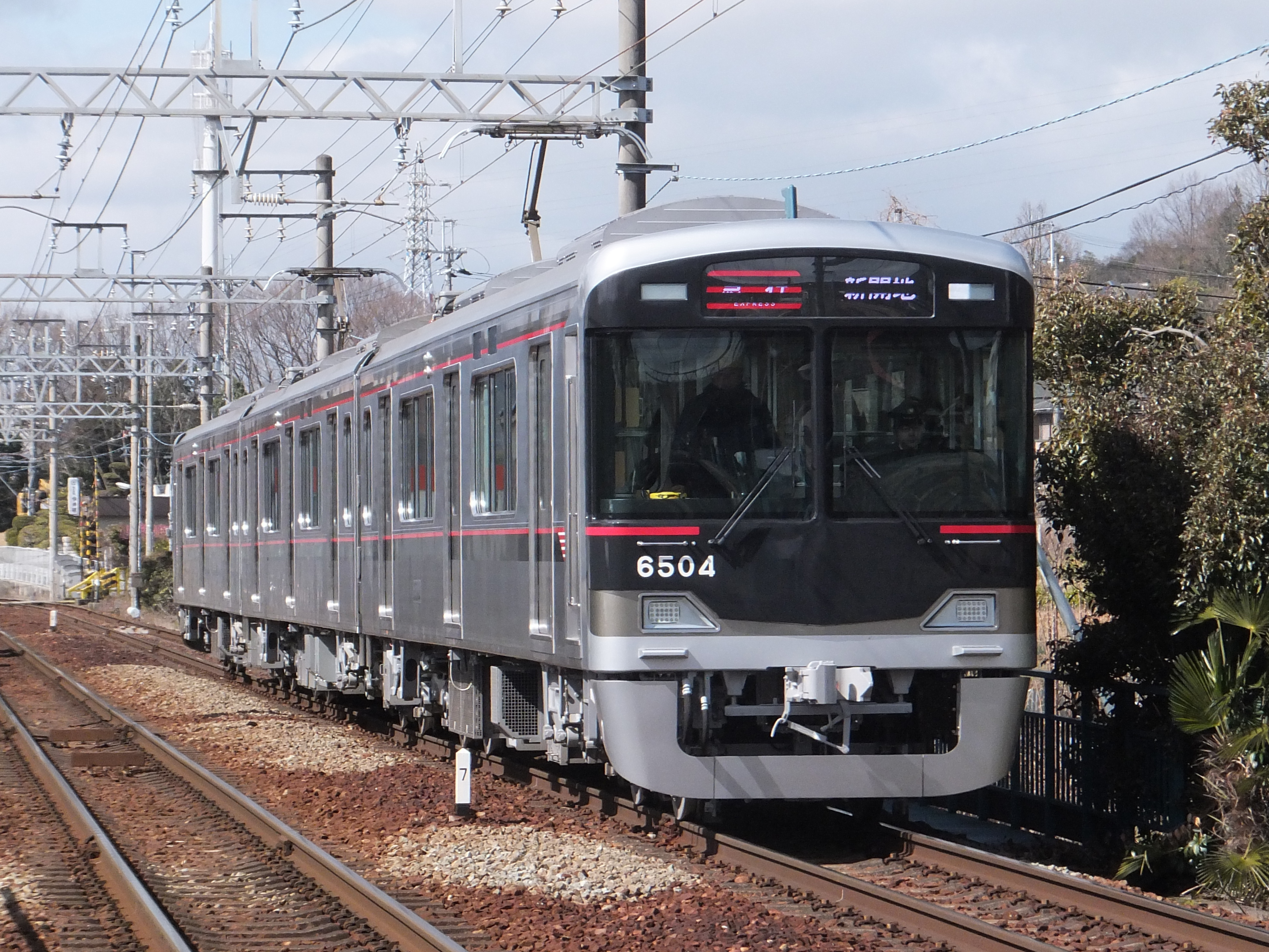
- Set 6503 in February 2017
- Manufacturer: Kawasaki Heavy Industries
- Built at: Kobe
- Replaced: 1000 series
- Constructed: 2015–
- Entered service: 21 May 2016
- Number under construction: 3 vehicles (1 set)
- Number built: 21 vehicles (7 sets)
- Number in service: 21 vehicles (7 sets) (as of February 2020)
- Formation: 3 cars per trainset
- Capacity: 354 (including 237 standing)
- Operators: Kobe Electric Railway

Specifications
- Car body construction: Stainless steel
- Car length: 18,290 mm (60 ft 0 in) (end cars); 18,140 mm (59 ft 6 in) (intermediate cars)
- Width: 2,700 mm (8 ft 10 in)
- Height: 4,030 mm (13 ft 3 in)
- Floor height: 1,140 mm (3 ft 9 in)
- Doors: 3 pairs per side
- Maximum speed: 100 km/h (62 mph)
- Traction system: Variable frequency (SiC-MOSFET)
- Traction motors: MB-5158-B 140 kW traction motors x 8
- Power output: 1,120 kW
- Electric system(s): 1,500 V DC overhead lines
- Current collection: PT7162-A single-arm pantograph
- Bogies: KW-211 (motored), KW-212 (trailer)
- Track gauge: 1,067 mm (3 ft 6 in)

The Shintetsu 6500 series (神戸電鉄6500系, Kōbe Dentetsu 6500-kei) is an electric multiple unit (EMU) train type operated by the private railway operator Kobe Electric Railway (Shintetsu) in Japan since May 2016.

== Design ==
The trains were built by Kawasaki Heavy Industries in Kobe. Based on the earlier 6000 series trains also built by Kawasaki Heavy Industries, they have stainless steel bodies with three pairs of sliding doors per side.

== Formation ==
The trains are formed as three-car sets as follows, with two motored driving ("Mc") cars sandwiching a non-powered trailer ("T") intermediate car.

Designation	Mc1	T	Mc2
Numbering	650x	660x	650x
Weight (t)	34.2	29.6	34.2
Capacity (Total/seated)	115/37	124/43	115/37

The two motored cars each have one PT7162-A single-arm pantograph.

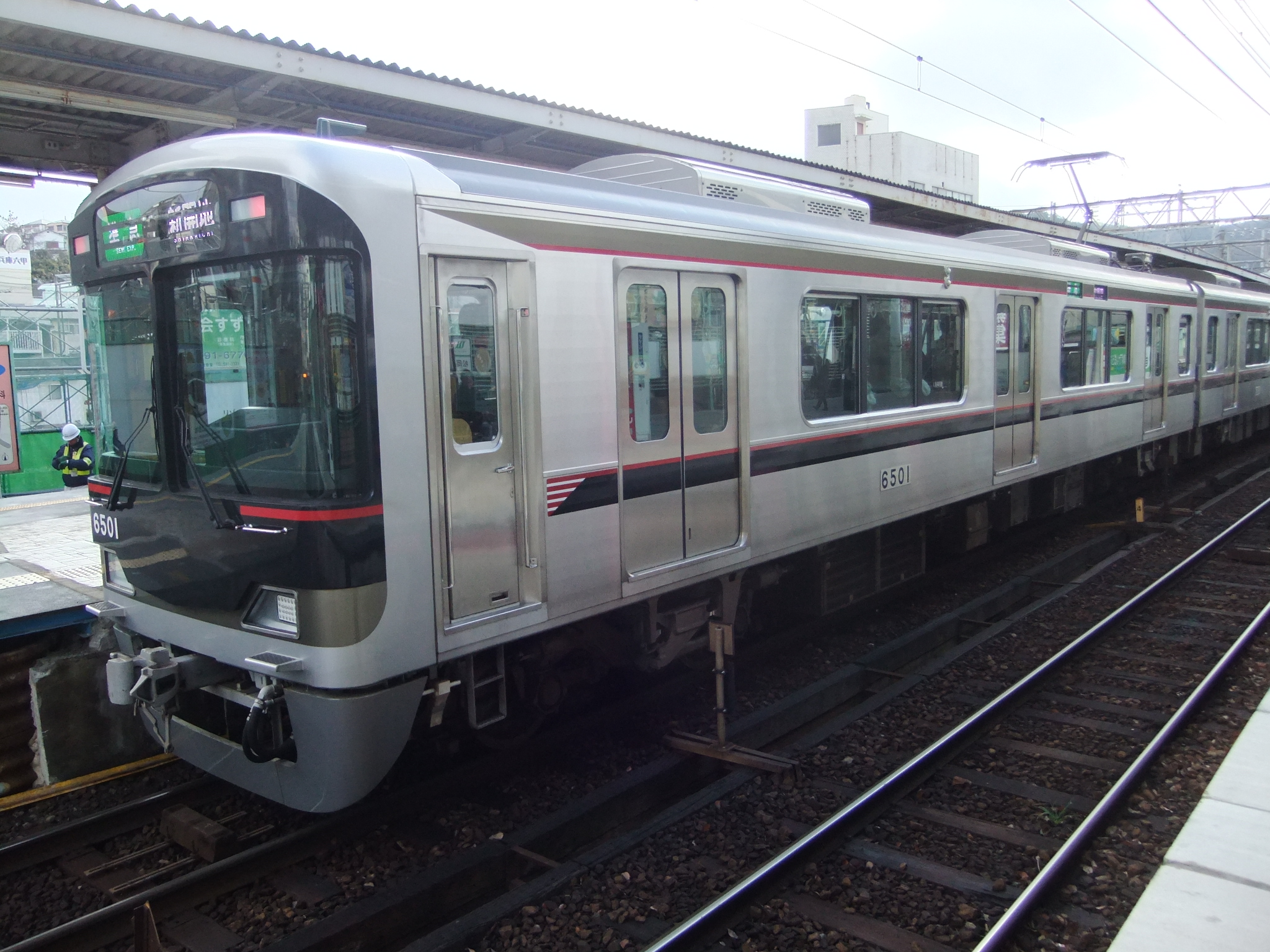
Car 6501

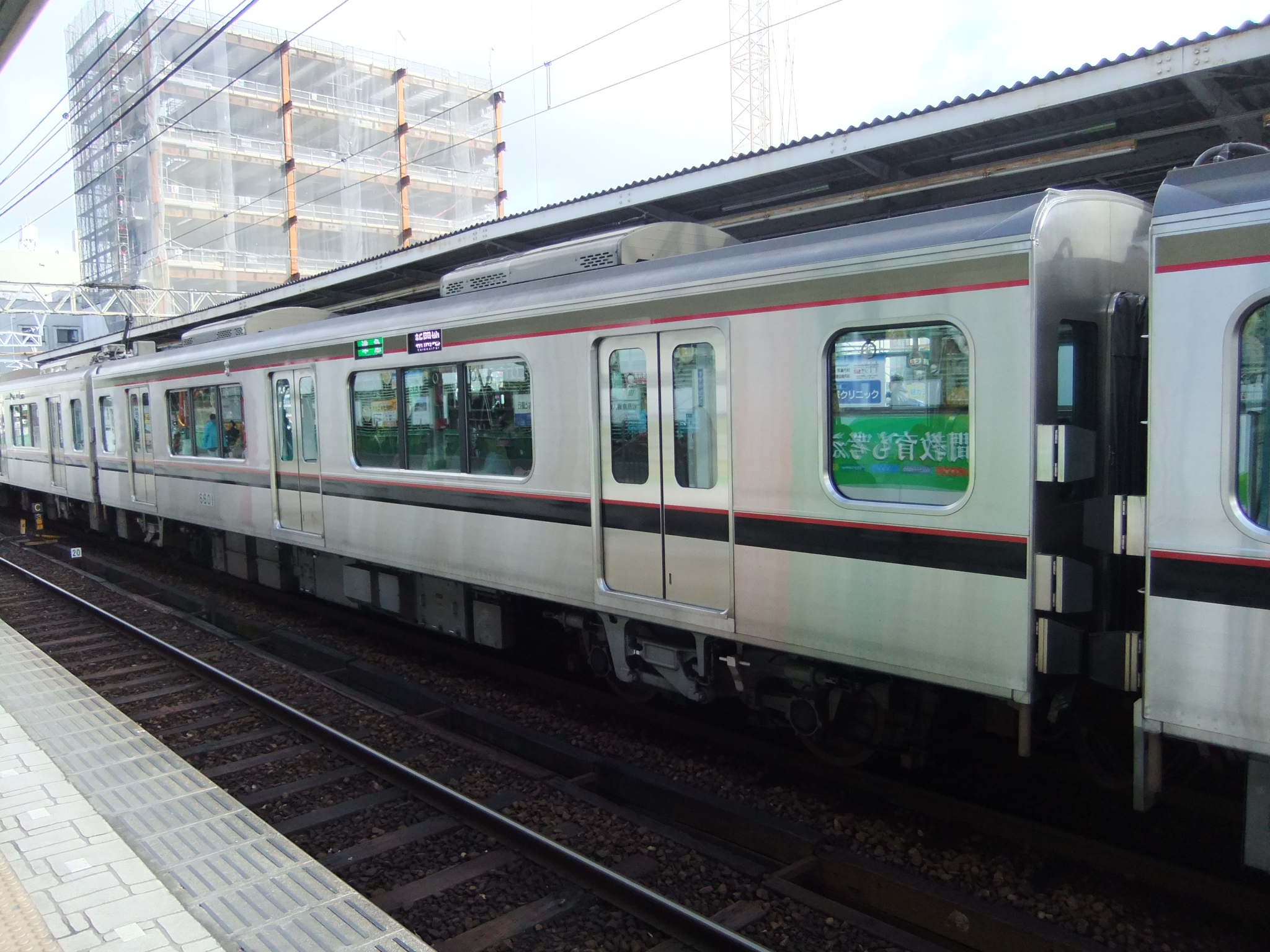
Car 6601

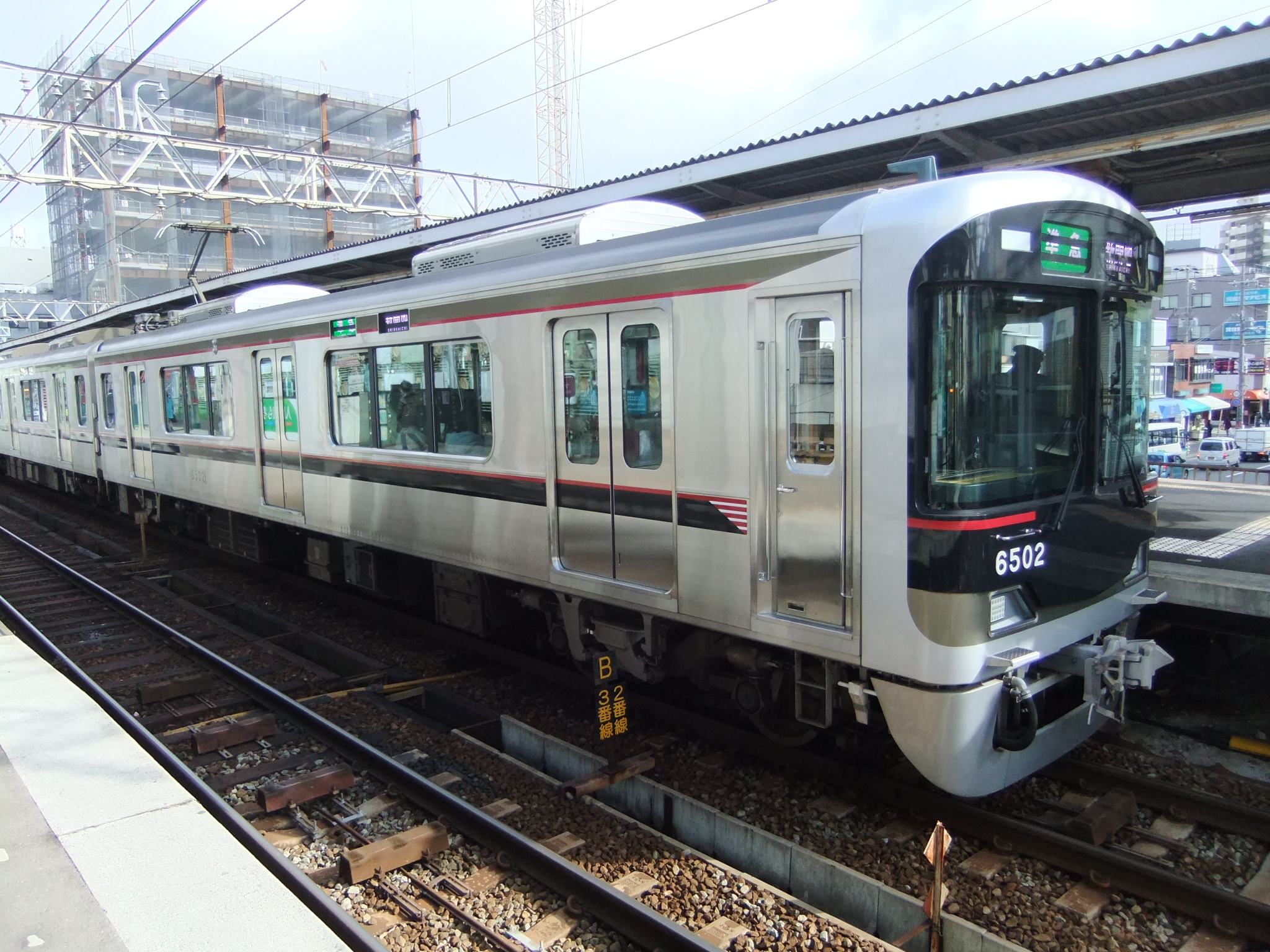
Car 6502

== Interior ==
Passenger accommodation consists of longitudinal bench seating. LCD passenger information screens above the doorways provides information in four languages: Japanese, English, Chinese, and Korean. Each car includes a wheelchair space.

== History ==
Details of the new order were announced in June 2015. The first set, 6501, entered service on 21 May 2016.

=== Fleet/build details ===
The individual build histories for the fleet are as follows.

Set No.	Car numbers	Date delivered
6501F	6501 - 6601 - 6502	29 February 2016
6503F	6503 - 6602 - 6504	1 February 2017
6505F	6505 - 6603 - 6506	1 February 2018
6507F	6507 - 6604 - 6508	12 March 2018
6509F	6509 - 6605 - 6510	2 February 2019
6511F	6511 - 6606 - 6512	5 March 2019
6513F	6513 - 6607 - 6514	2 February 2020
