= 600s =

600s may refer to:

- The period from 600 to 699, almost synonymous with the 7th century (601–700).
- The period from 600 to 609, known as the 600s (decade), almost synonymous with the 61st decade (601–610).
