= Toei 6500 series =

Japanese train type

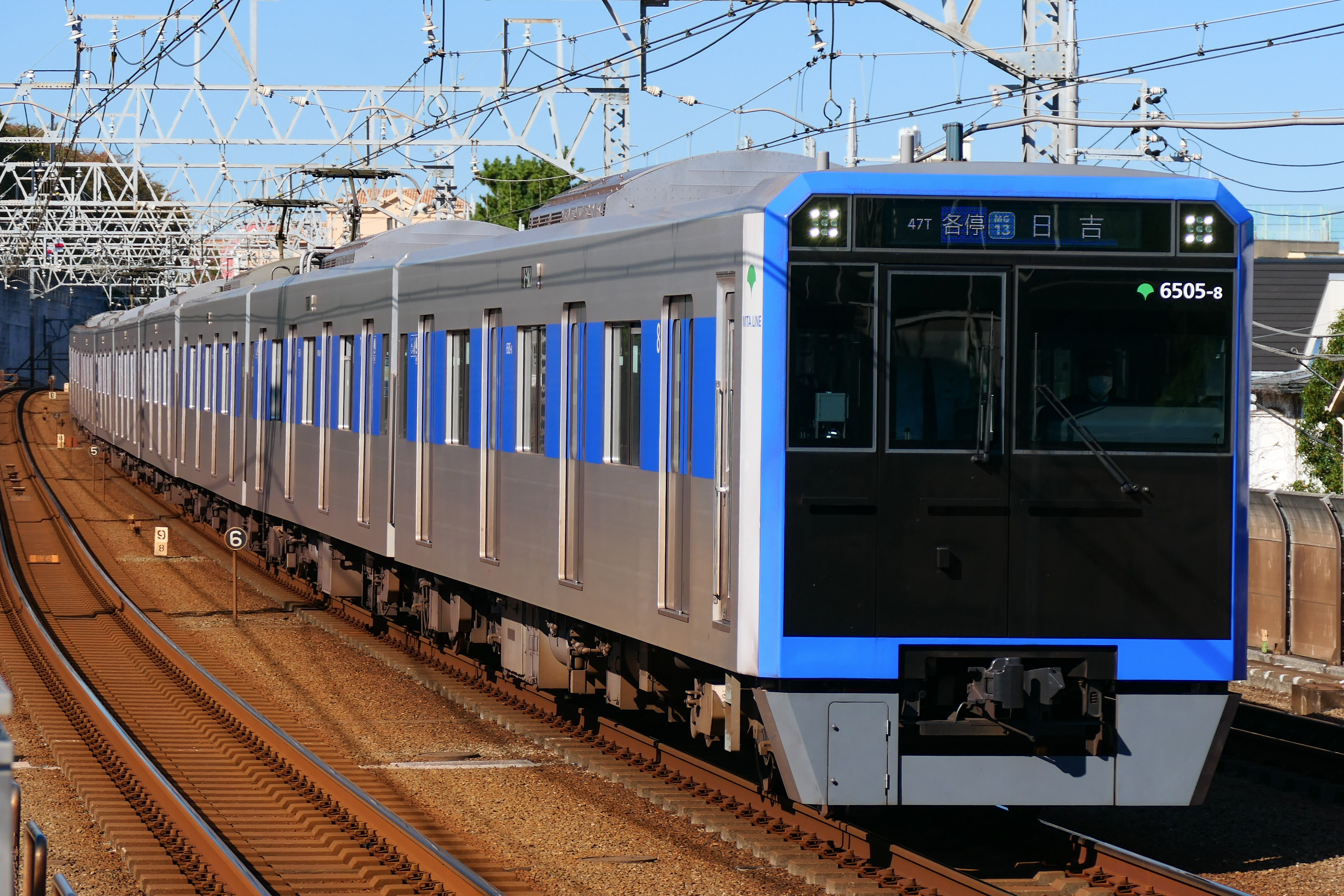
- A Toei Mita Line 6500 series train
- In service: 2022–present
- Manufacturer: Kinki Sharyo
- Built at: Osaka
- Replaced: 6300 series
- Constructed: 2020–2022
- Entered service: 14 May 2022
- Number built: 104 vehicles (13 sets)
- Number in service: 104 vehicles (13 sets)
- Formation: 8 cars per trainset
- Fleet numbers: 6501–6513
- Capacity: 1172 (8-car set); 139 (end cars); 149 (intermediate cars)
- Operator: Toei Subway
- Depot: Shimura
- Lines served: Toei Mita Line; Meguro Line; Tōkyū Shin-yokohama Line

Specifications
- Car body construction: Aluminium alloy, double skin
- Train length: 160.94 m (528 ft 0 in)
- Car length: 20.47 m (67 ft 2 in) (end cars); 20 m (65 ft 7 in) (intermediate cars)
- Width: 2,829 mm (9 ft 3.4 in)
- Height: 4,056 mm (13 ft 3.7 in); 4.1 m (13 ft 5 in) (with pantograph folded)
- Floor height: 1.13 m (3 ft 8 in)
- Doors: 4 per side
- Wheel diameter: 860 mm (34 in)
- Maximum speed: 120 km/h (75 mph) (design); 110 km/h (68 mph) (service)
- Weight: 251.8 t (247.8 long tons; 277.6 short tons)
- Traction system: Mitsubishi IGBT (hybrid-SiC)–VVVF
- Electric systems: 1,500 V DC overhead catenary
- Current collection: Pantograph
- UIC classification: 2′2′+Bo′Bo′+Bo′Bo′+2′2′+2′2′+Bo′Bo′+Bo′Bo′+2′2′
- Track gauge: 1,067 mm (3 ft 6 in)

The Toei 6500 series (都営6500形, Toei 6500-gata) is an electric multiple unit (EMU) train type operated by the Tokyo Metropolitan Bureau of Transportation (Toei) in Japan.

== Specifications ==
The trains use hybrid-SiC/IGBT–VVVF technology, and are formed as eight-car sets. The interior includes multilingual passenger information displays and security cameras.

The design of the trains revolved around the concept of universal design. This is represented in various features of the trains:

- An open space inside the cars to accommodate passengers with heavy luggage or mobility aids such as wheelchairs
- Widening the space near the doors to facilitate boarding and deboarding at platforms especially during busy times
- Increasing the number of hand straps, handrails, and luggage racks above the seating area

The trains are also fitted with onboard Wi-Fi. In addition, these will be the first trainsets to be equipped with onboard data collection.

=== Interior ===
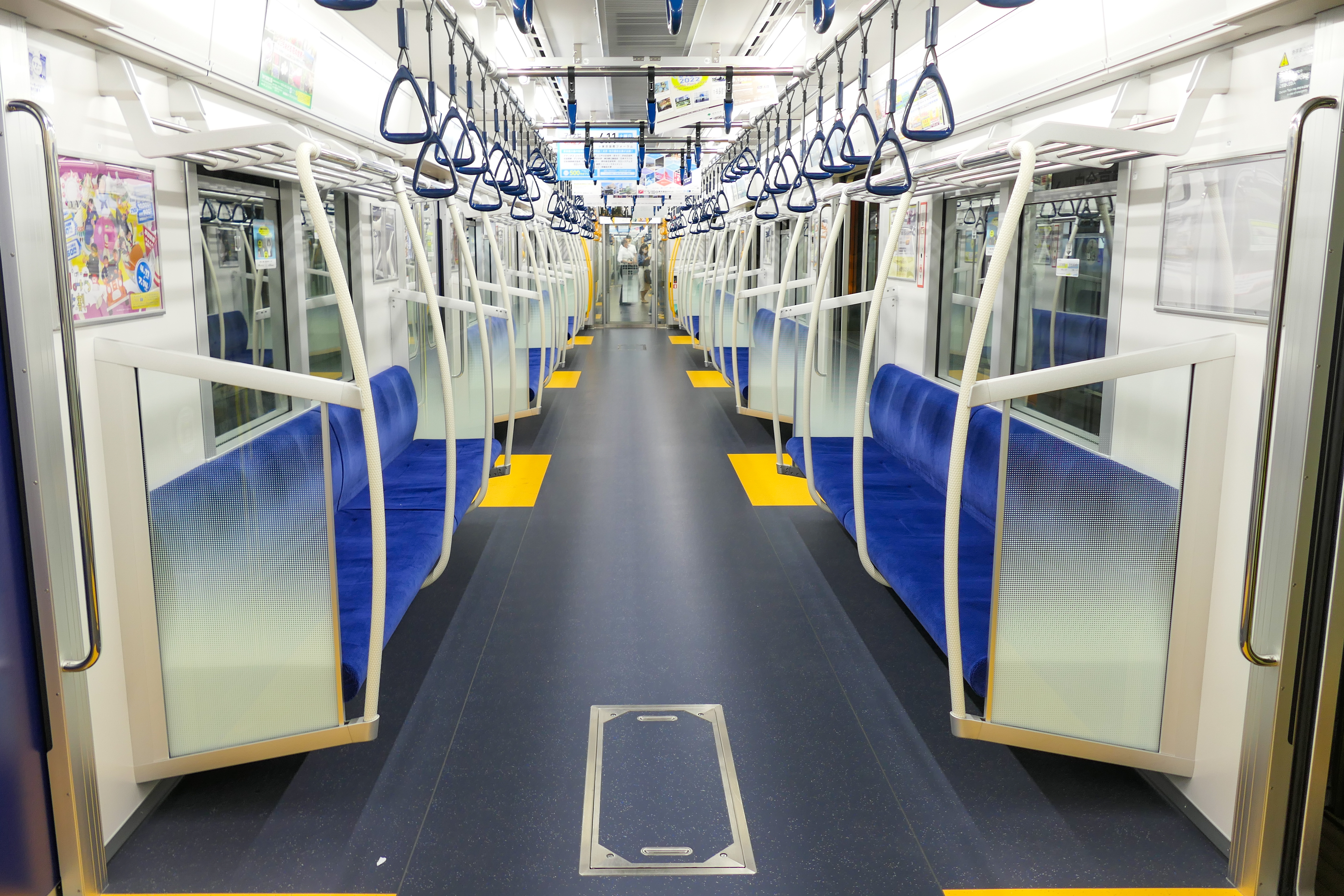
Interior

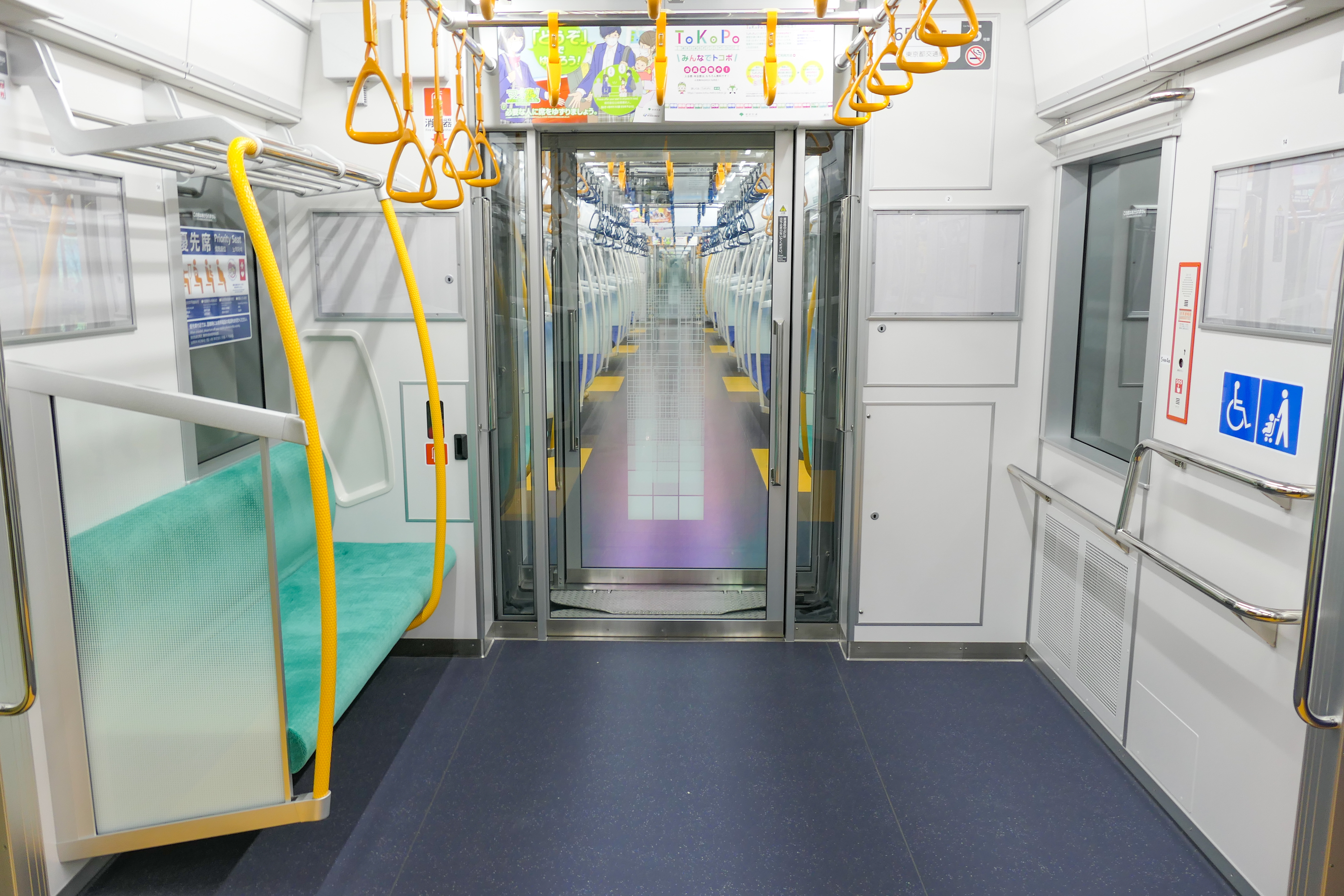
Accessible area

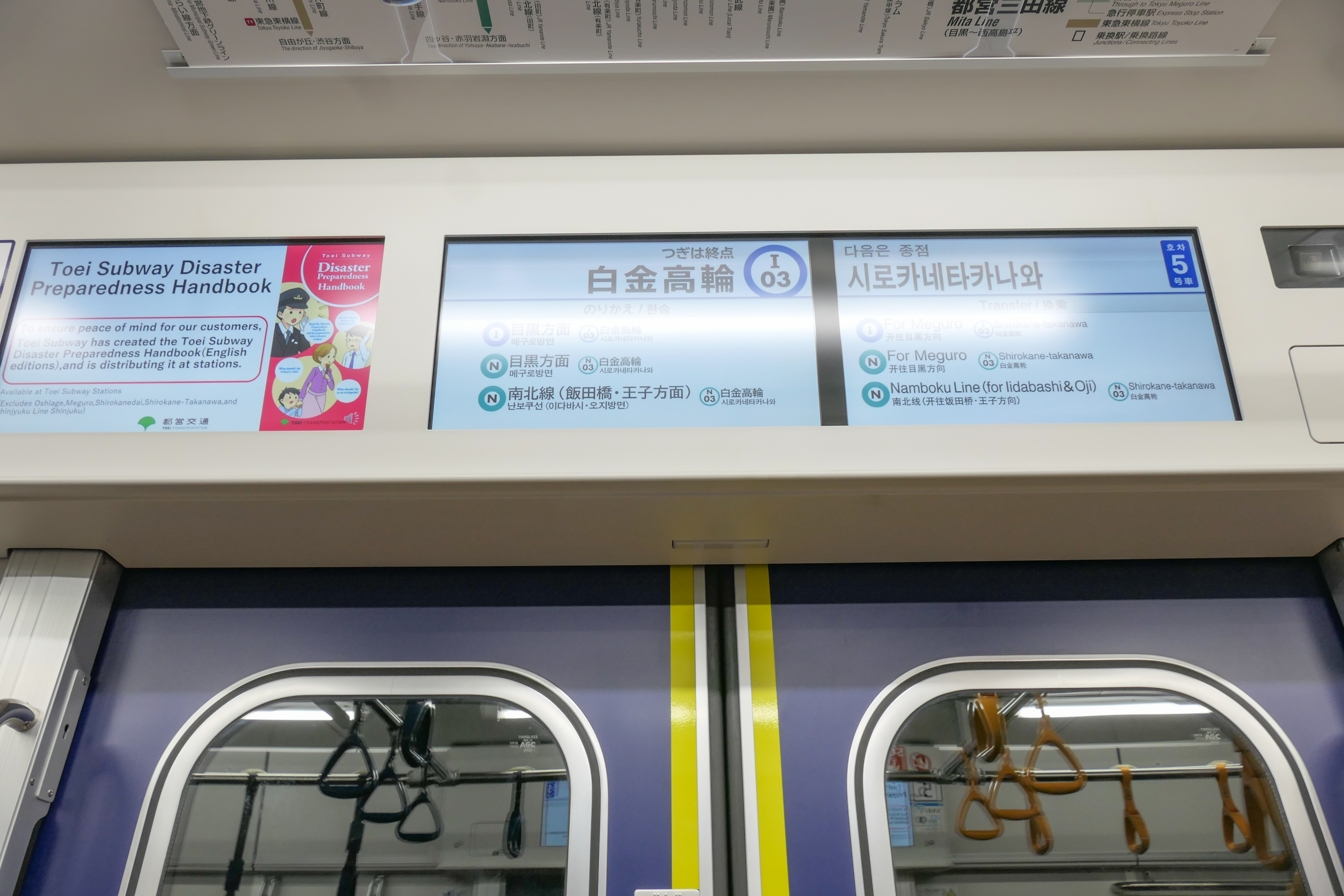
Onboard LCD information display

LED side destination sign

== Formation ==
The sets are formed as follows.

| | ← Meguro Nishi-takashimadaira → | | | | | | | |
| Designation | 6500-8 (Tc8) | 6500-7 (M7) | 6500-6 (M6) | 6500-5 (T5) | 6500-4 (T4) | 6500-3 (M3) | 6500-2 (M2) | 6500-1 (Tc1) |

== History ==
The 6500 series was announced by Toei on 29 October 2020. The first set was delivered in 2020. Test runs are scheduled to start in November 2020. A total of 13 sets, 104 cars, were built by Kinki Sharyo. The 6500 series trainsets made their first trips in revenue service on 14 May 2022, after stations' platforms on Mita Line and Meguro Line were extended to accommodate eight-car trainsets.

The last 6500 series set, 6513, was delivered in August 2022.

On 7 October 2022, Kinki Sharyo announced that the 6500 series received the 2022 Good Design Award.
