= Toei 6000 series =

Japanese train type

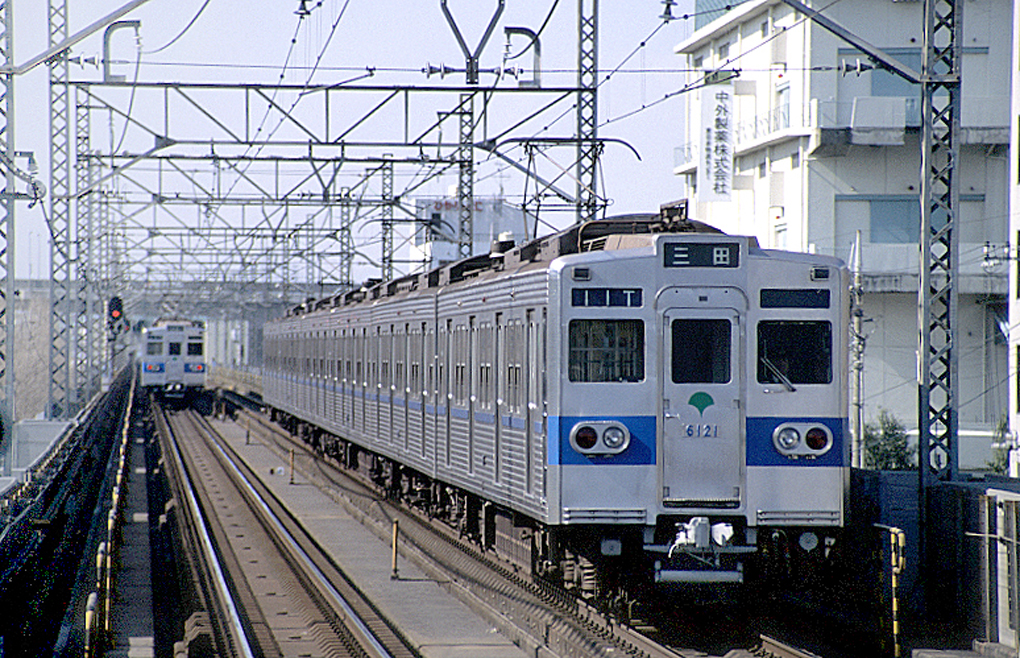
- Set 6121 on the Toei Mita Line in February 1999
- In service: 1968–1999 (Toei Mita Line), 1999–present (Chichibu Railway and Kumamoto Electric Railway), 2000–2016 (Kereta Commuter Indonesia)
- Manufacturers: Kawasaki Heavy Industries, Nippon Sharyo, Alna Kōki, Hitachi
- Constructed: 1968–1976
- Entered service: 27 December 1968
- Number built: 168 vehicles (28 sets)
- Number in service: 24 vehicles (10 sets, Chichibu Railway and Kumamoto Electric Railway), 0 vehicles (Toei and KAI Commuter)
- Number preserved: 2 vehicles (including KAI Commuter Depok depot)
- Number scrapped: 72 vehicles (Indonesia)
- Successor: Toei 6300 series Tokyo Metro 6000 series, Tokyo Metro 05 series, 203 series, 205 series (Indonesia)
- Formation: 6 cars per set (Toei Mita Line); 8 cars per set (Kereta Commuter Indonesia); 3 cars per set (Chichibu Railway); 2 cars per trainset (Kumamoto Electric Railway)
- Capacity: 150 (50 seating) (end cars), 170 (58 seating) (intermediate cars)
- Operators: Toei Subway (1968–1999); Chichibu Railway (1999–present); Kumamoto Electric Railway (1999–present); Kereta Commuter Indonesia (2000–2016)
- Lines served: Toei Mita Line; KA Commuter Bogor/Nambo Line, KA Commuter Cikarang Loop Line, KA Commuter Tangerang Line, KA Commuter Rangkasbitung Line, KA Commuter Tanjung Priok Line (2000–2016)

Specifications
- Car body construction: Stainless steel
- Car length: 20 m (65 ft 7 3/8 in)
- Width: 2.79 m (9 ft 1 7/8 in)
- Height: 3.69 m (12 ft 1 1/4 in) with pantograph:4.045 m (13 ft 3 1/4 in)
- Doors: 4 pairs per side
- Maximum speed: 70 km/h (43 mph) (operating), 100 km/h (62 mph) (design)
- Weight: 215.5 t (212.1 long tons; 237.5 short tons)
- Traction system: Resistor control + Westinghouse Natal cardan drive
- Power output: 2,400 kW (3,200 hp)
- Acceleration: 3.5 km/(h⋅s) (2.2 mph/s)
- Deceleration: 4 km/(h⋅s) (2.5 mph/s) (service), 5 km/(h⋅s) (3.1 mph/s) (emergency)
- Electric system: 1,500 V DC overhead wire
- Current collection: Pantograph
- Bogies: KD-70
- Braking systems: Dynamic braking, electromagnetic direct brake
- Safety system: T-ATS
- Coupling system: Janney coupler
- Track gauge: 1,067 mm (3 ft 6 in)

The Toei 6000 series (都営6000形, Toei 6000-gata) is an electric multiple unit (EMU) train type operated by the Tokyo subway operator Tokyo Metropolitan Bureau of Transportation (Toei) on the Toei Mita Line in Tokyo, Japan, between 1968 and 1999, and subsequently on the Chichibu Railway (since 1999), Kumamoto Electric Railway, and Kereta Commuter Indonesia in Indonesia (from 2000 until 2016).

== History ==
The first sets were delivered in November 1968, and entered revenue service from 27 December of the same year. The 6000 series won the 1969 Laurel Prize from the Japan Railfan Club.

=== Refurbishment ===
Between 1988 and 1989, 6000 series trains were refurbished so that they were retrofitted with air conditioning and their headlights were upgraded.

=== Retirement ===
Following the introduction of the 6300 series in 1993, Toei retired the 6000 series trains. The last train was retired from the Mita Line on 28 November 1999.

=== Resale ===
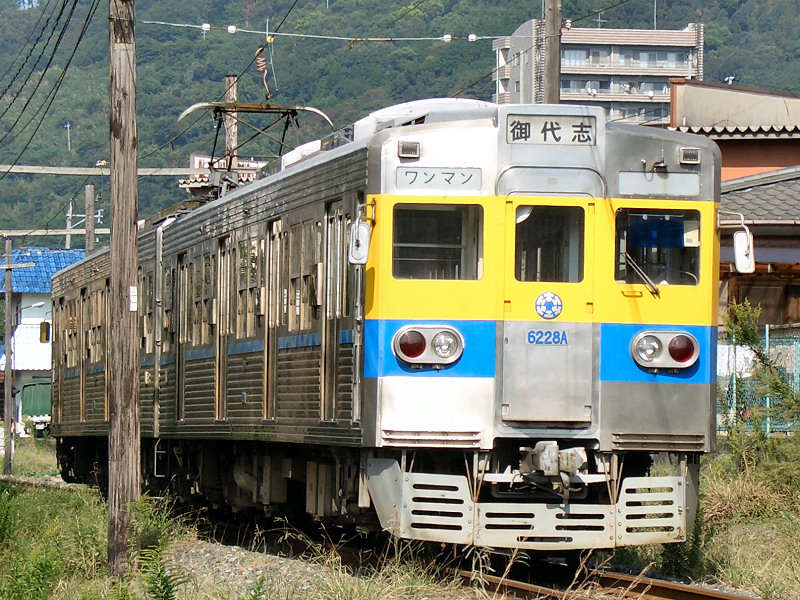
Kumamoto Electric Railway 6000 series in September 2006

Following withdrawal from the Toei Mita Line in 1999 and replacement by Toei 6300 series EMUs, a number of former 6000 series units were resold to other railway operators in Japan and also donated to KA Commuter Jabodetabek (at the time, it was Jabotabek Urban Transport Division) in Indonesia.

- Chichibu Railway 5000 series 3-car sets
- Kumamoto Electric Railway 6000 series 2-car sets
- KRL Jabodetabek 6000 series

==== Chichibu Railway 5000 series ====
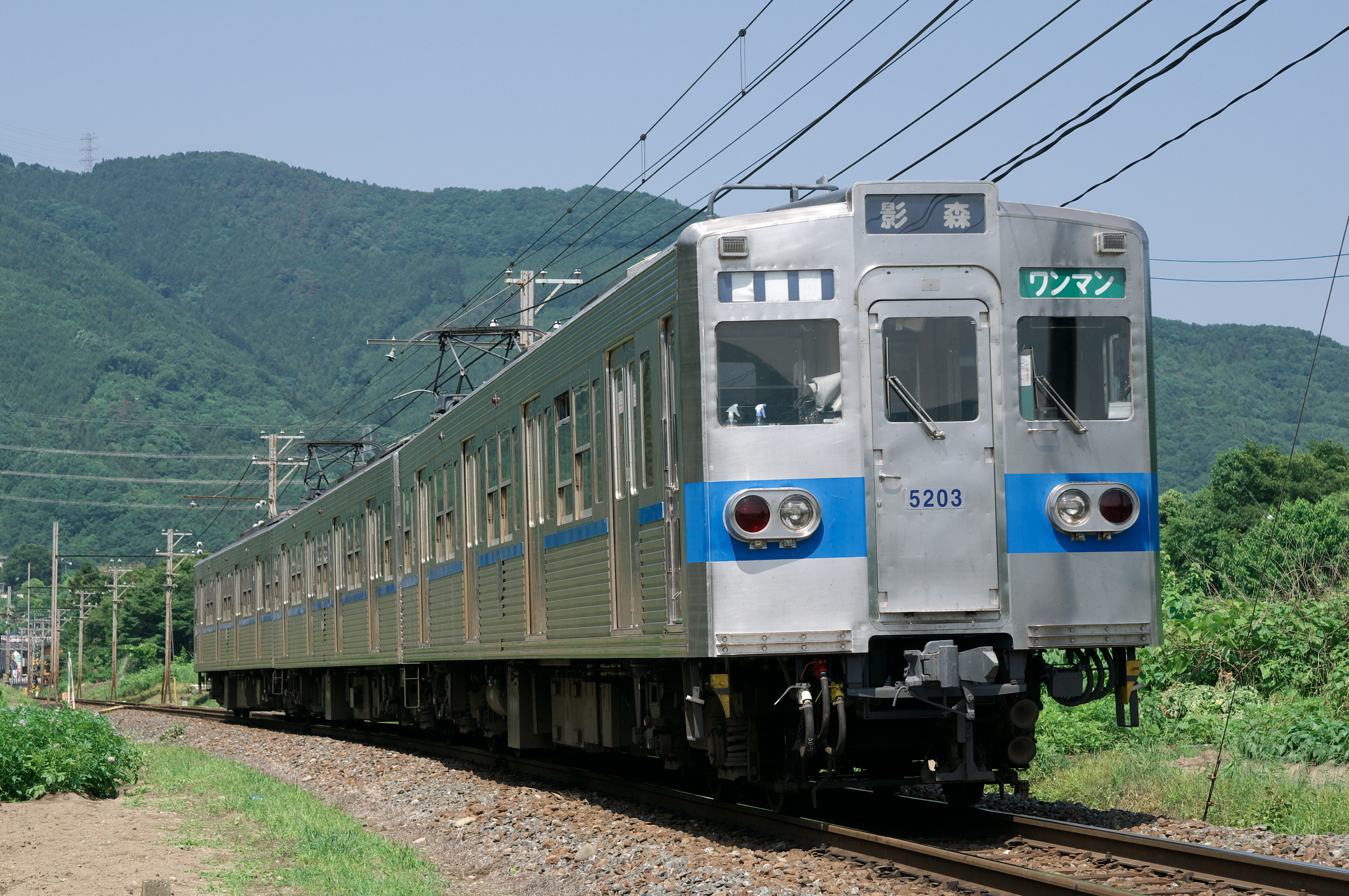
A Chichibu Railway 3-car 5000 series set in June 2011

12 former 6000 series cars were sold to the Chichibu Railway in 1999, where they were reformed as four three-car 5000 series sets.

The original Toei car numbers and subsequent identities were as follows.

Toei numbering	Chichibu numbering
6191	5001
6196	5101
6198	5201
6241	5002
6246	5102
6248	5202
6251	5003
6256	5103
6258	5203
6261	5004
6266	5104
6268	5204

==== Indonesia ====
72 former 6000 series cars were donated to KRL Jabotabek (later KA Commuter Jabodetabek) in Indonesia in 2000 as part of an Official development assistance (ODA) programme to upgrade commuter train services in the Jakarta area.

Eight six-car sets (6121, 6151, 6161, 6171, 6181, 6201, 6271, and 6281) and 24 middle cars were shipped to Indonesia, entering revenue service there from August 2000. In 2004, the trainsets were reformed into eight six-car sets and three eight-car sets, made possible by rebuilding some former intermediate cars with new driving cabs. These new driving cab would be called "Palkon", "Rakitan", "Lohan", & "Espass" The fleet subsequently underwent further extensive reorganization and rebuilding of driving cars damaged in accidents.

Withdrawals commenced in December 2012 with set 6201, displaced by an increasing number of newer and longer trains delivered from Japan like: Tokyo Metro 6000 series, Tokyo Metro 05 series, 203 series and 205 series. The last set to remain in service, 6181, was repainted into the new KA Commuter Jabodetabek red livery in February 2016, before finally being withdrawn in September 2016.

Since February 2018, car 6181 from the last operating set, 6181F, is now preserved in Depok EMU Depot as a static display, with electrical systems such as lighting and automatic door fully operational, due to some modifications to the train.

===== Gallery =====
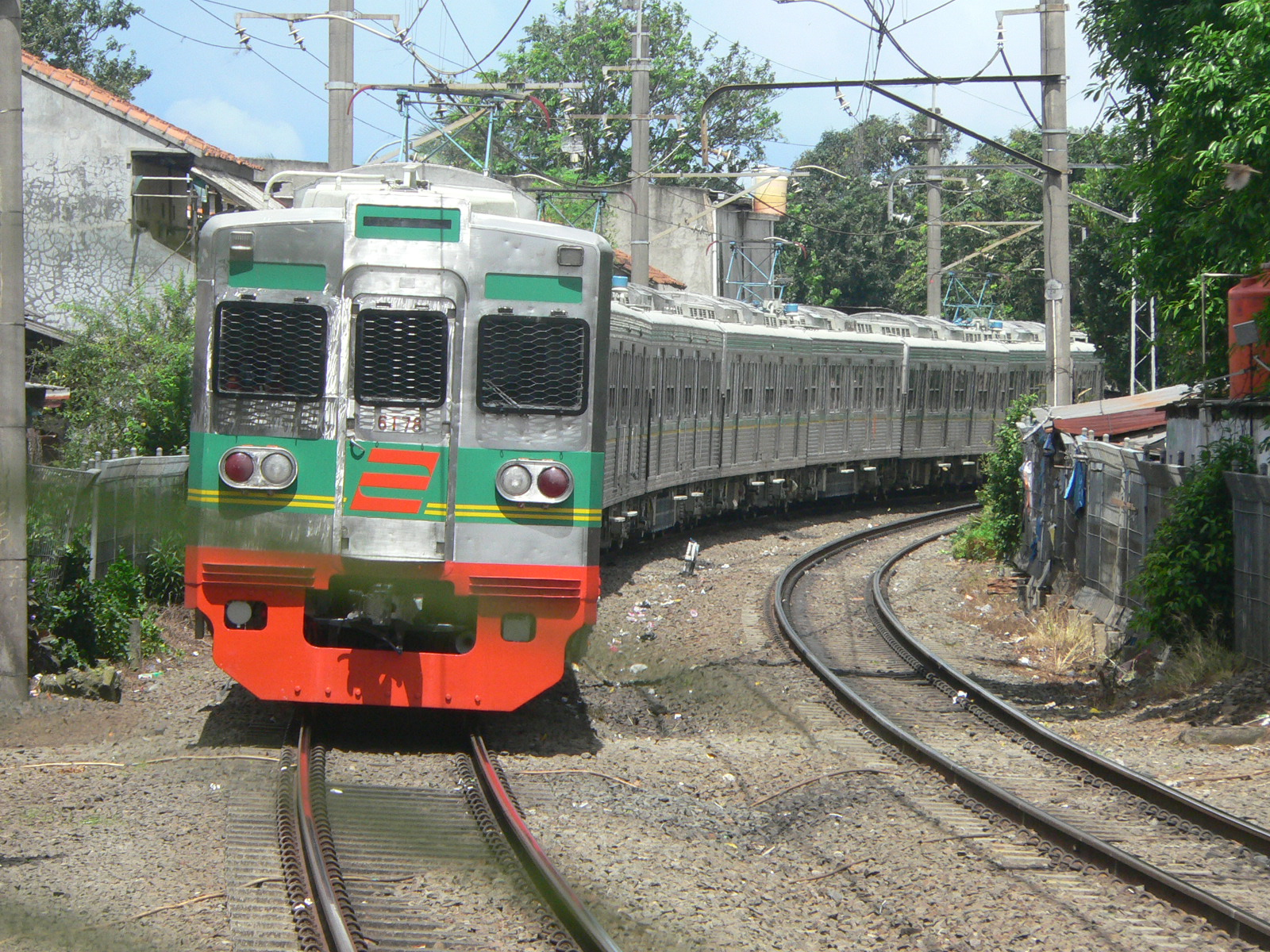
Former set 6171 in Indonesia in May 2011

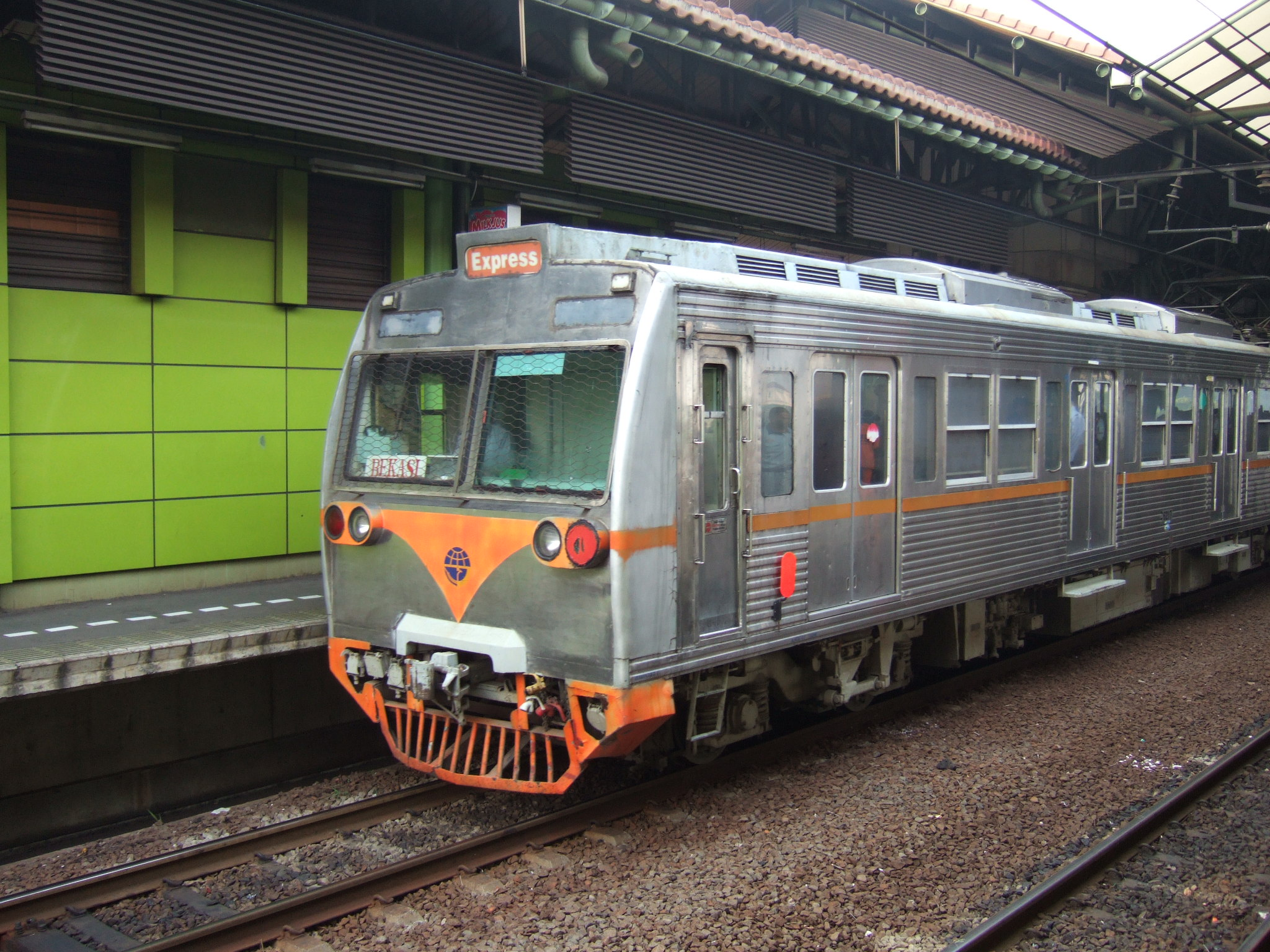
Former Toei 6000 series set in Indonesia with rebuilt front end called "Rakitan" in July 2007

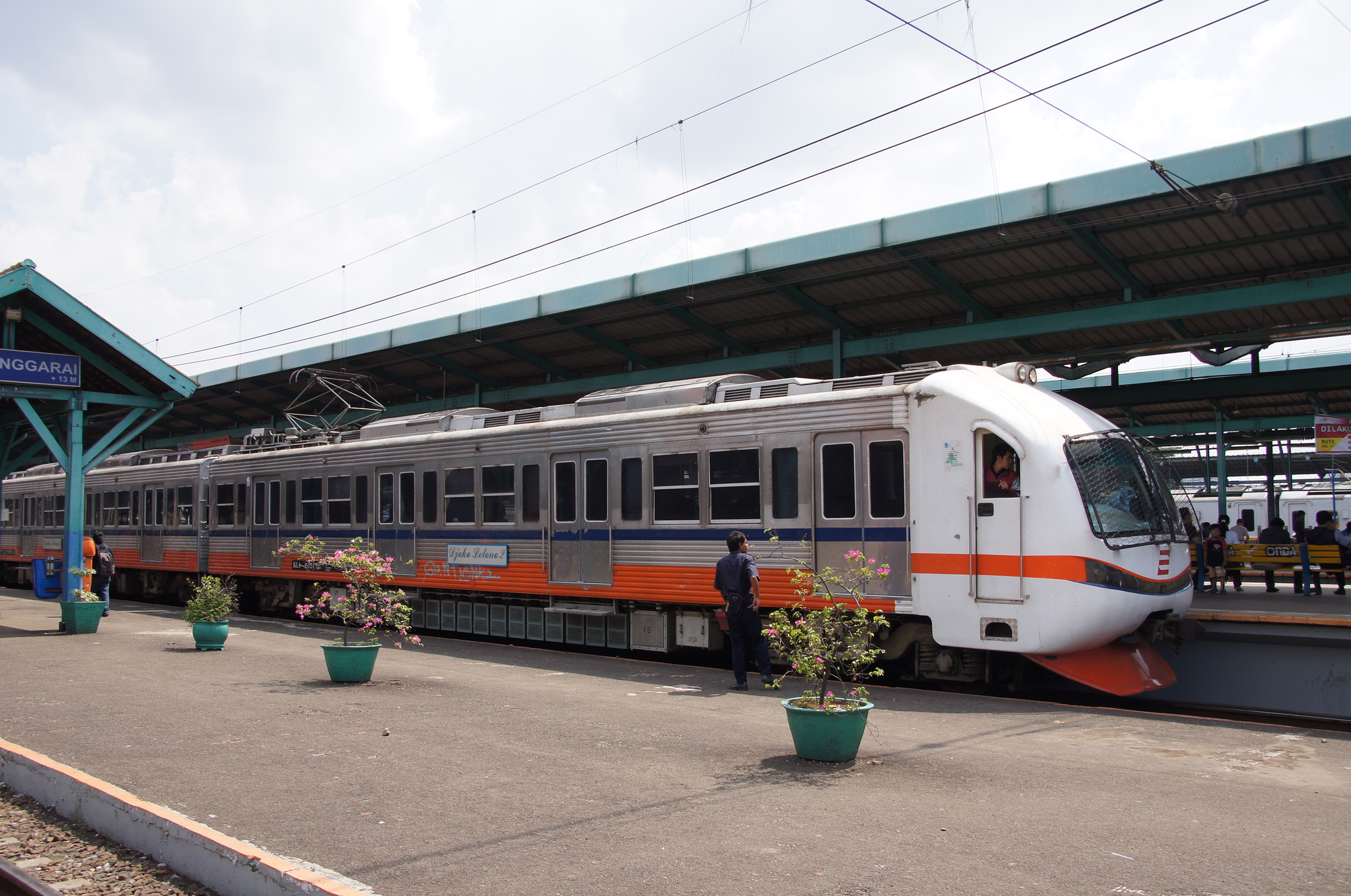
Car 6151 with a rebuilt Djoko Lelono 2 front end as part of a 4-car set in November 2011

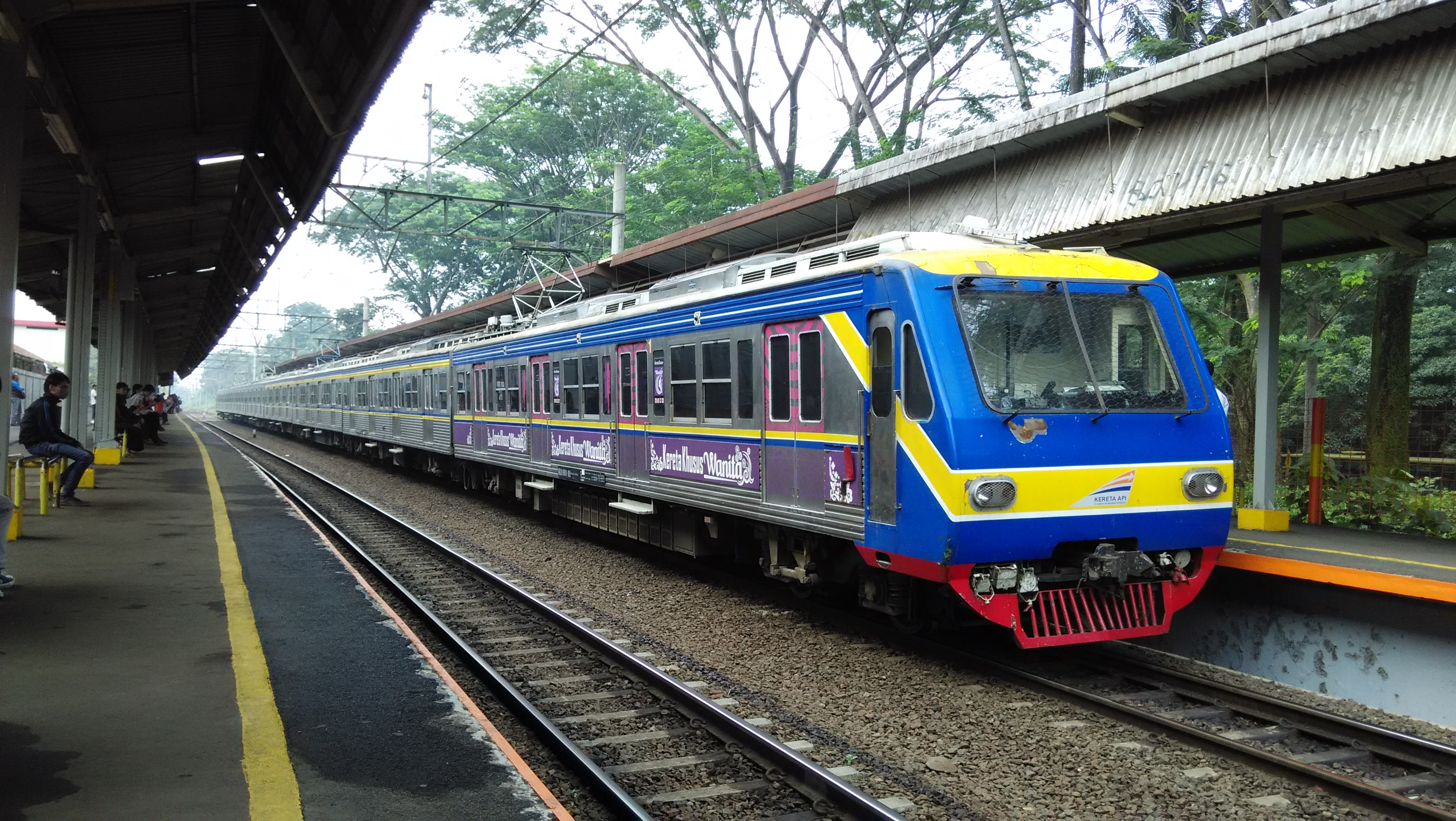
Set 6177 with a rebuilt front end called "Espass" in November 2014

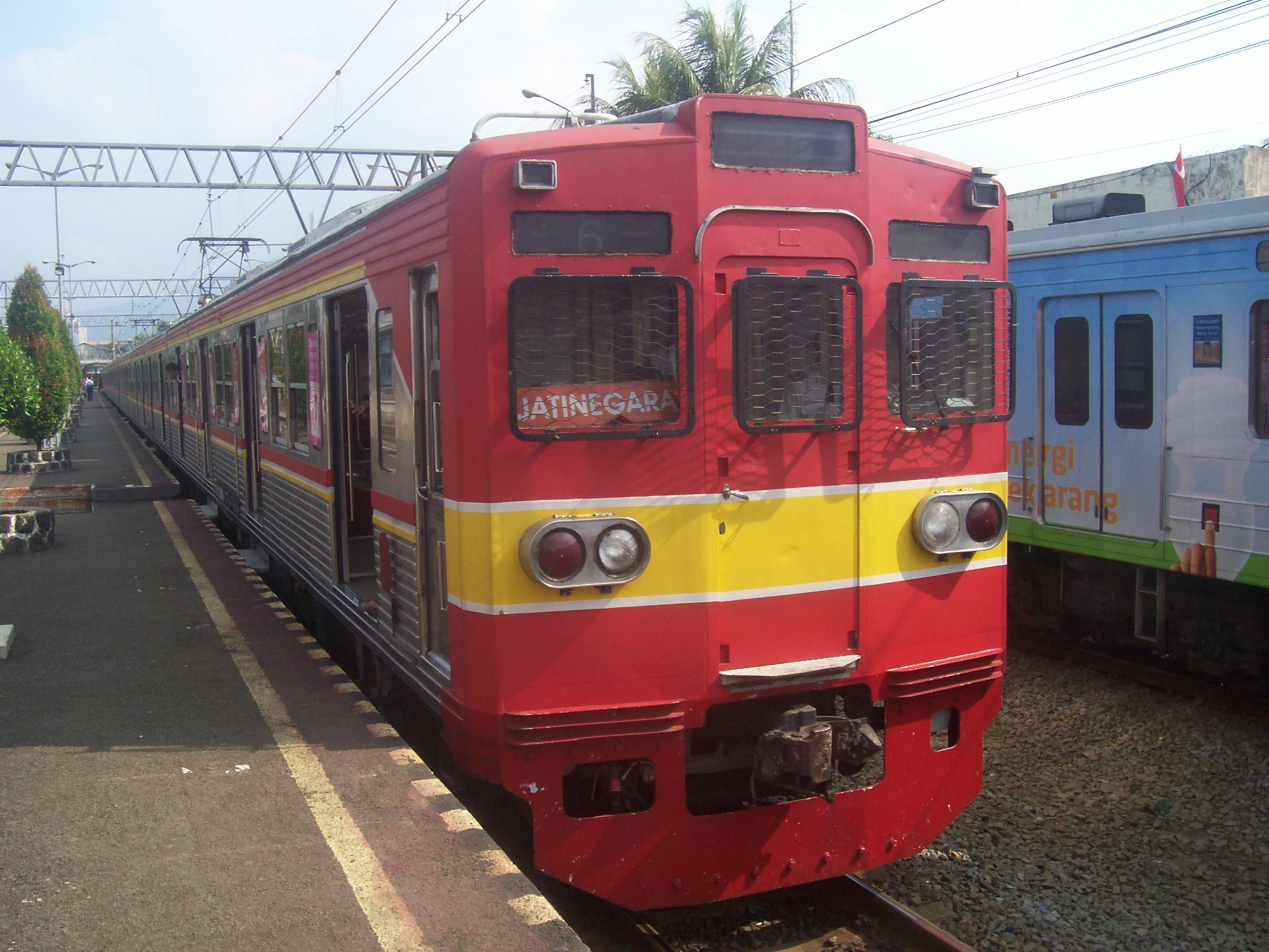
Former set 6181 in "KCJ" livery in September 2016

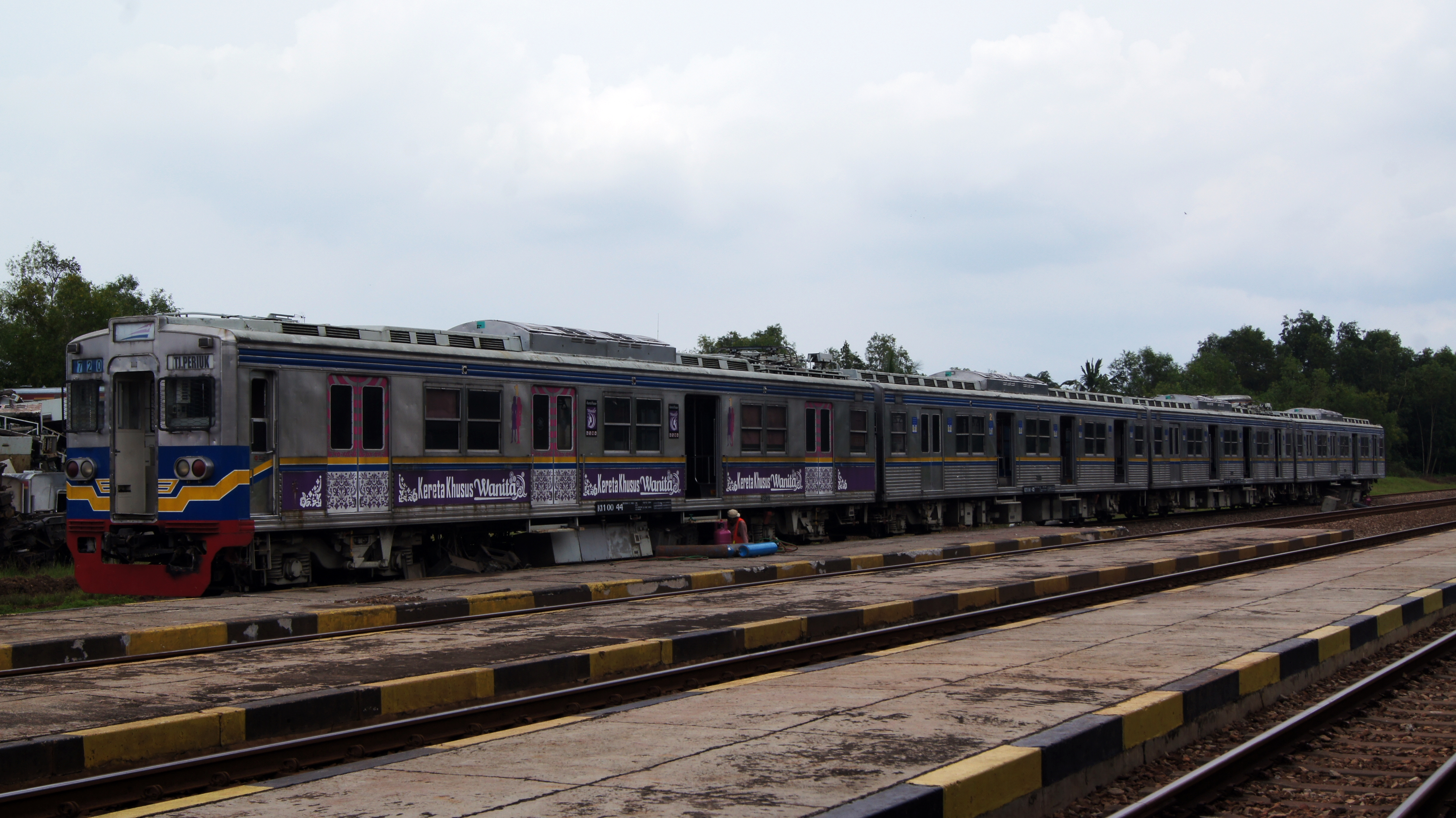
Former set 6281 awaiting scrapping in Indonesia in December 2016

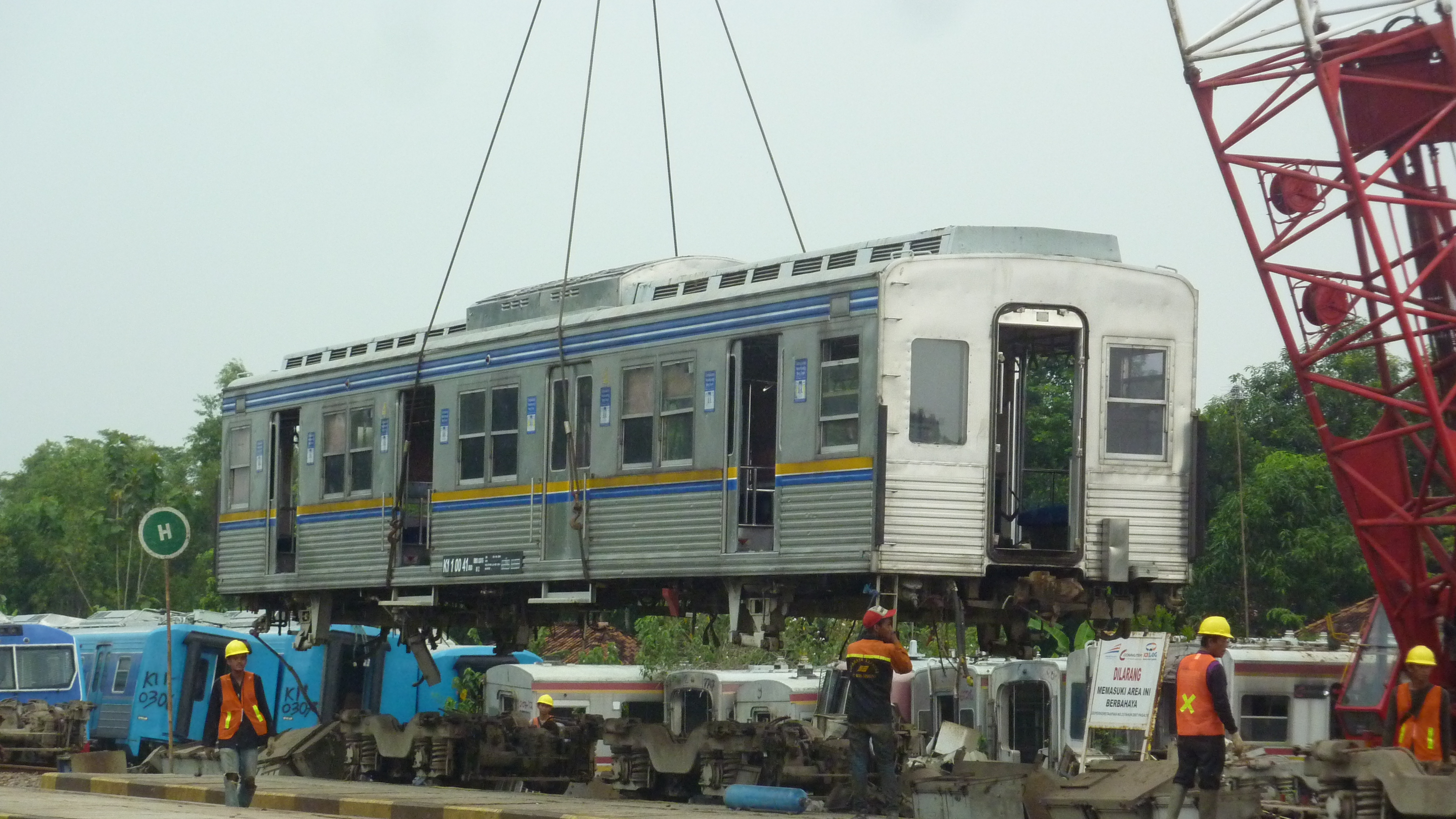
Set 6275 is lifted to Cikaum

== Exterior ==
Originally delivered with red bodyside bands and unpainted stainless steel front ends, red was changed to blue, and the bands were extended to the front ends from 1988.

== Interior ==
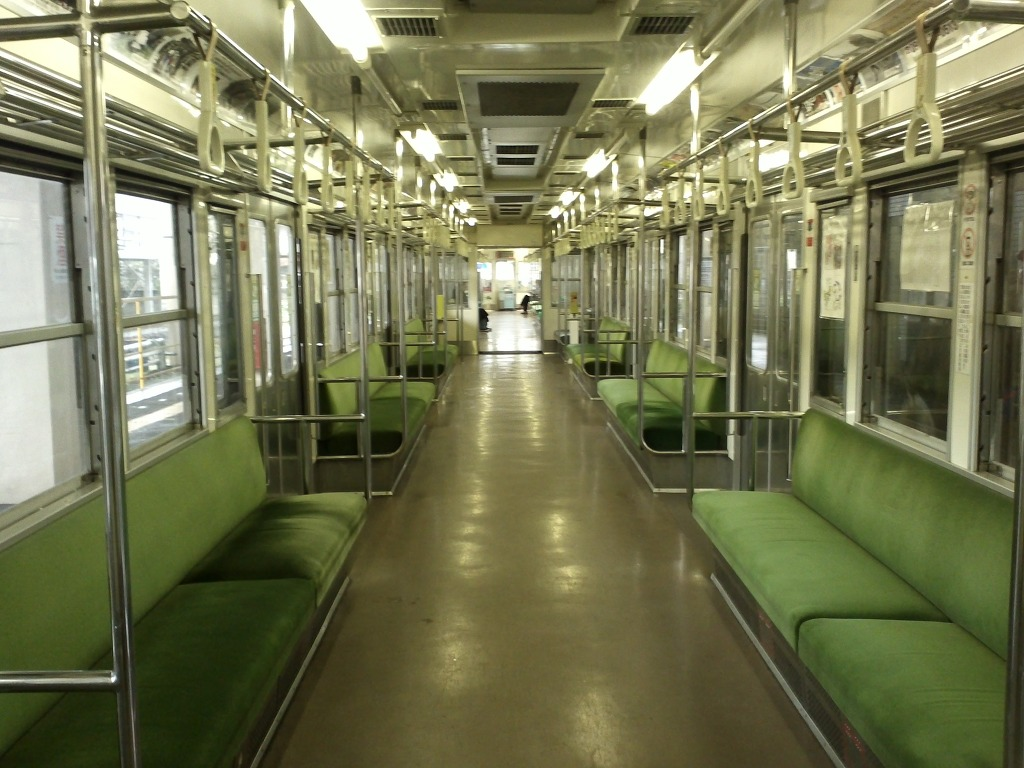
Interior of Kumamoto Electric Railway 6000 series

== See also ==
- KAI Commuter
