= Nagoya Municipal Subway 6000 series =

Japanese train type

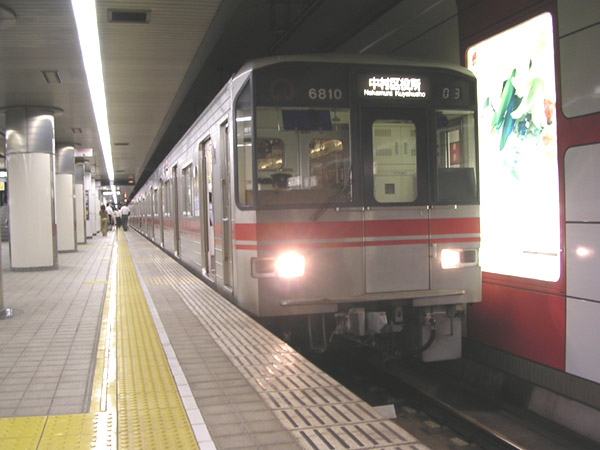
- Nagoya Municipal Subway 6000 series
- In service: 1987–Present
- Manufacturer: Nippon Sharyo
- Constructed: 1987–1994
- Entered service: October 1987
- Refurbished: 2012-2021
- Number built: 100 cars (20 Sets)
- Formation: 5 cars per trainset (originally 4 cars)
- Fleet numbers: 6101–6820
- Capacity: 668
- Operators: Transportation Bureau City of Nagoya
- Depots: Tokushige
- Lines served: Sakura-dōri Line

Specifications
- Car body construction: Stainless steel
- Car length: 20,000 mm (65 ft 7 in)
- Width: 2,746 mm (9 ft 0.1 in)
- Height: 4,140 mm (13 ft 7 in)
- Floor height: 1,150 mm (45 in)
- Doors: 4 pairs per side
- Maximum speed: 75 km/h (45 mph)
- Traction system: Mitsubishi Electric MAP-174-15V14 GTO-VVVF (As Built); MAP-174 15V238 IGBT-VVVF
- Acceleration: 3.0 km/(h⋅s) (1.9 mph/s)
- Deceleration: 3.5 km/(h⋅s) (2.2 mph/s) (service); 4.0 km/(h⋅s) (2.5 mph/s) (emergency)
- Electric system(s): 1500 V DC
- Current collector(s): Overhead line
- Bogies: SS008, SS136, ND721
- Braking system(s): regenerative brakes
- Safety system(s): ATC, ATO, Meitetsu ATS (1 set)
- Track gauge: 1,067 mm (3 ft 6 in)

The Nagoya Municipal Subway 6000 series (名古屋市交通局6000形) is a rapid transit electric multiple unit (EMU) train type operated by the Transportation Bureau City of Nagoya on the Nagoya Subway Sakura-dōri Line in Japan since 1989.

== Formation ==
The trainsets are formed as follows.

Car No.	1	2	3	4	5
Designation	MC	T1	M'	M	TC
Numbering	6100	6200	6300	6700	6800
Weight (Metric tons)	36.0	28.0	34.0	35.0	30.0
Capacity Total/seated	127/48	140/54	152/54	140/54	127/48
	138/46	152/54		152/54	138/46
