= Rinshi-no-mori Park =

Park in Tokyo, Japan

Coordinates: 35.625028°N 139.703267°E

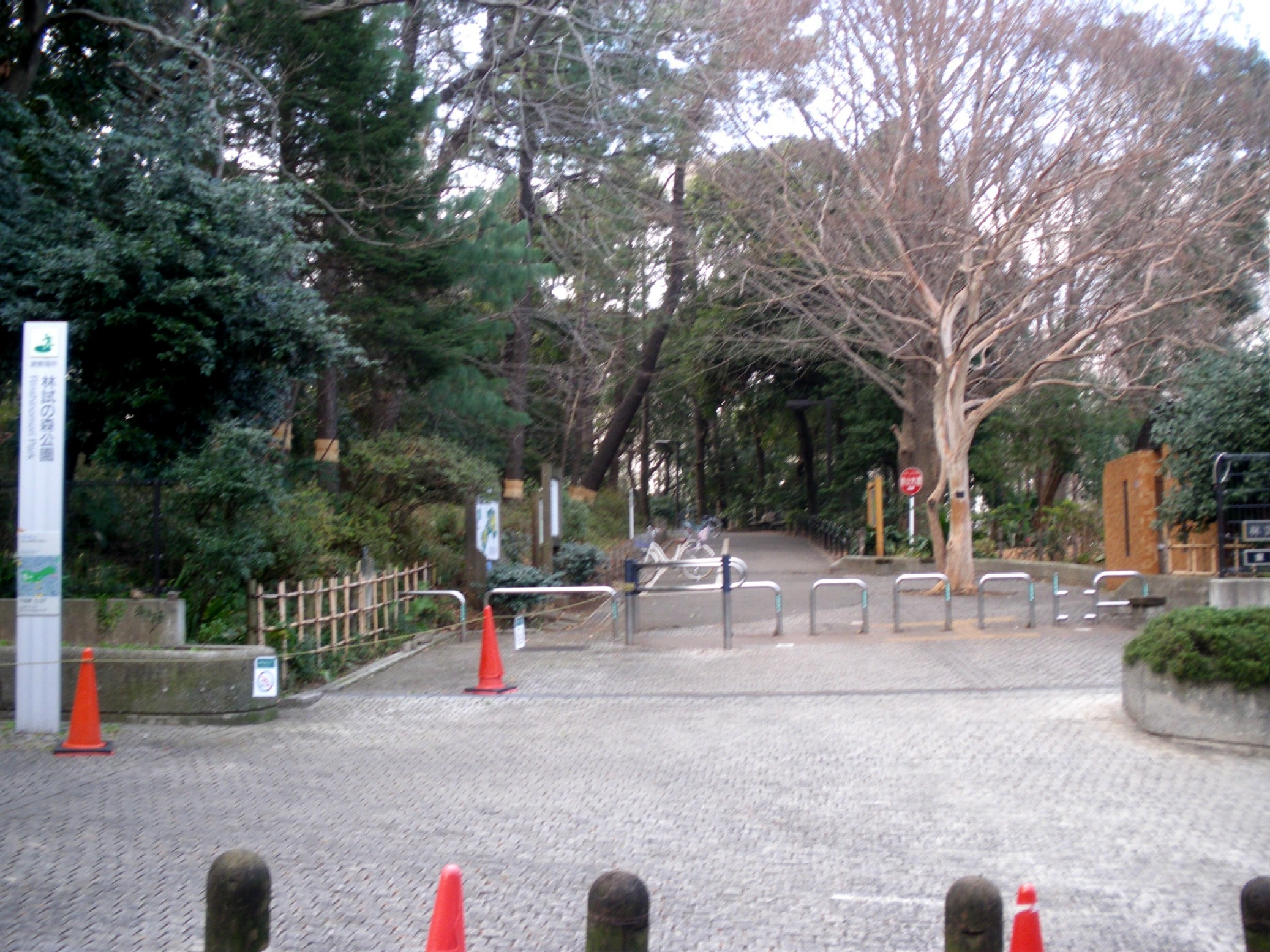
- Entrance to the park
- Interactive map of Rinshi-no-mori Park
- Location: Meguro and Shinagawa, Tokyo, Japan
- Area: 120,762 square metres (29.841 acres)
- Created: 1 June 1989
- Public transit: Fudō-mae Station and Musashi-Koyama Station

Rinshi-no-mori Park (林試の森公園, Rinshi-no-mori Kōen) is a public park that straddles the wards of Meguro and Shinagawa in Tokyo, Japan. The park's name derives from the Japanese term ringyo shikenba (林業試験場), meaning an experimental forestry station.

== Overview ==
- The thickest tree in the park is a zelkova with a trunk circumference of 3.82 m. The tallest tree is a poplar with a height of 35.5 m.
- Blue butterflies (Antigius attilia) can be found on old Chinese cork oak trees in the park. They are rare in the wild in Tokyo.
- A small valley runs from north to south in the center of the park. This is the remnant of an irrigation ditch.
- In addition to a forest with large trees, there is a lawn plaza, a day camp facility, a pond for children to play in in the summer, and a ground on the west side that can be used for baseball and soccer training.

== Access ==
- By train: 9 minutes’ walk from Fudō-mae Station or Musashi-Koyama Station on the Tōkyū Meguro Line
Water wheel in the park

== See also ==
- Parks and gardens in Tokyo
- National Parks of Japan
