= Senzoku Station =

Railway station in Tokyo, Japan

Coordinates: 35.6105°N 139.6946°E

Senzoku Station 洗足駅

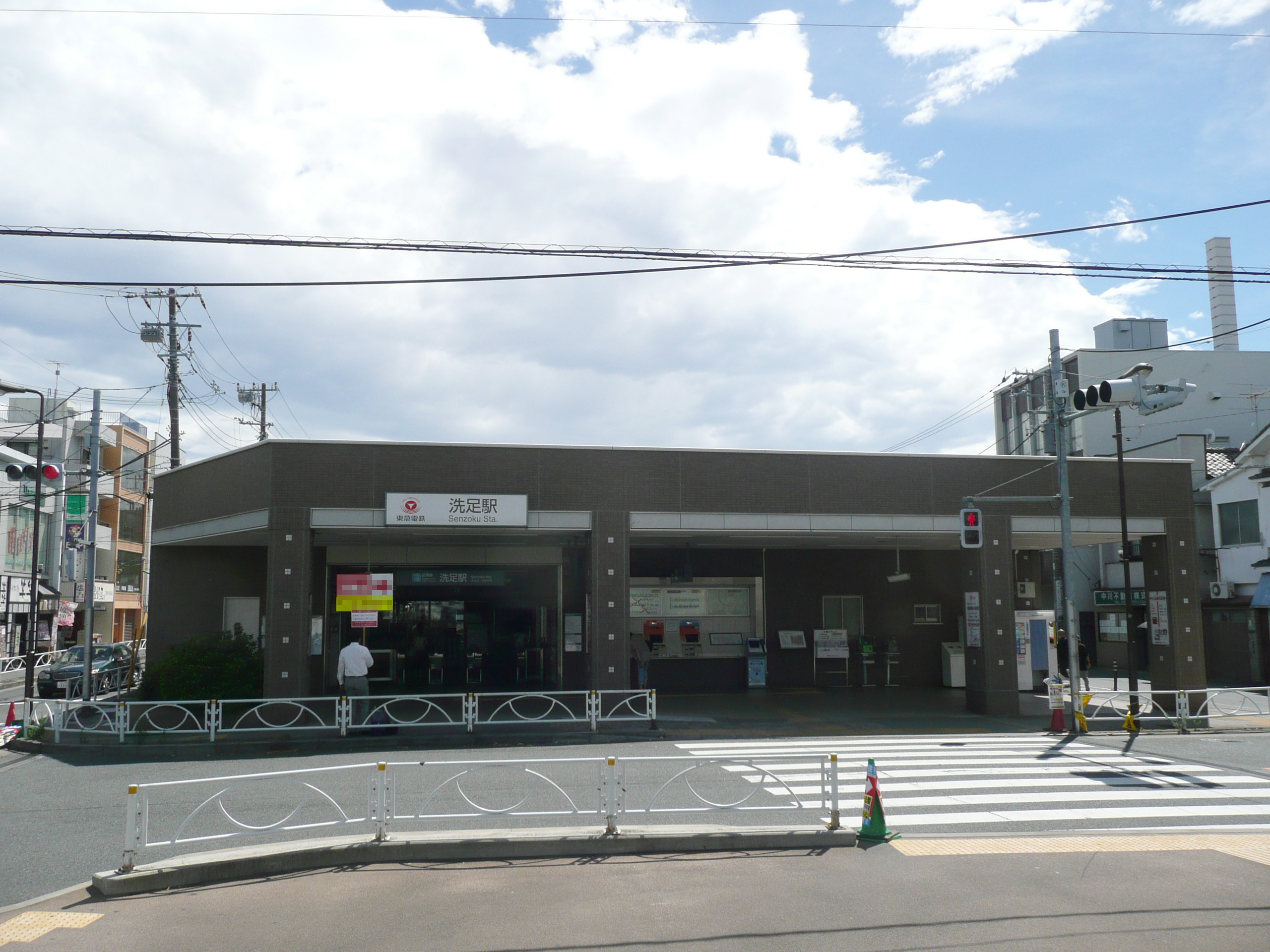
- Senzoku Station in July 2012

General information
- Location: 2-21-1 Senzoku, Meguro-ku, Tokyo; Japan
- Operator: Tōkyū Railways
- Line: Meguro Line
- Distance: 6.5 km (4.0 mi) from Meguro
- Platforms: 2 side platforms
- Tracks: 2

Construction
- Structure type: Underground

Other information
- Station code: MG05
- Website: Official website

History
- Opened: 11 March 1923; 103 years ago

Passengers
- FY2018: 15,146 daily

Services
Preceding station	Tōkyū Railways	Following station
Ōokayama towards Hiyoshi	Meguro Line Local	Nishi-koyama towards Meguro
Location
- Location within Special wards of Tokyo Location within Tokyo Bay and Bōsō Peninsula Location within Tokyo Location within Japan

Senzoku Station (洗足駅, Senzoku-eki) is a railway station on the Tokyu Meguro Line in Meguro, Tokyo, Japan, operated by the private railway operator Tokyu Corporation.

== Lines ==
Senzoku Station is served by the Tokyu Meguro Line, and lies 6.5 km from the starting point of the line at Meguro. Only local all-stations services stop at Senzoku station.

== Station layout ==
This station consists of two opposed side platforms serving two tracks.

=== Platforms ===
1	■ Tokyu Meguro Line	for Ookayama, Hiyoshi, Shin-Yokohama, and Futamatagawa
2	■ Tokyu Meguro Line	for Meguro, Akabane-iwabuchi, Urawa-misono, and Nishi-takashimadaira

== History ==
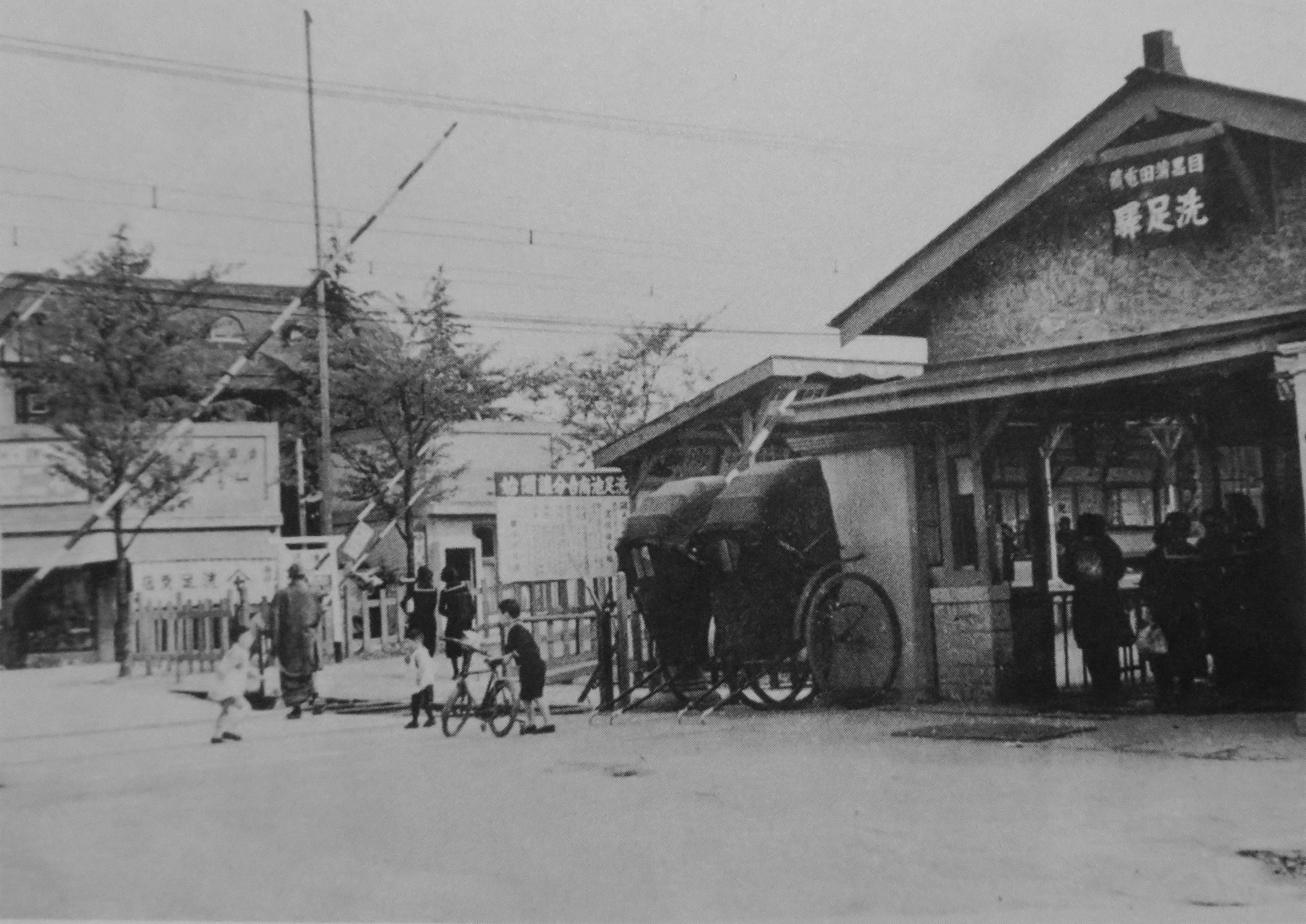
Senzoku Station, 1936, Photo by Kōyō Ishikawa.

The station opened on 11 March 1923. It was developed as an anchor of the Senzoku Garden City, which was itself named after the nearby Senzoku Pond (the namesake of Senzoku-ike Station on the Ikegami Line, about 1 km away).

Although the tracks were originally at street level, they were moved underground in 1967 in order to avoid a level crossing of Kannana-dori, a major prefectural highway located to the west of the station. The next station inbound, Nishi-koyama, was moved underground in 2006, and the northeast side of Senzoku was reconfigured with a new footbridge with elevators to allow traffic to cross.

== Passenger statistics ==
Year	Ridership
2010	14,085
2011	14,165
2012	14,311
2013	14,481
2014	14,499
2015	14,630
2016	14,863
2017	14,903
2018	15,146

== Surrounding area ==
- Showa University Senzoku Campus
- Kita-Senzoku Station (Oimachi Line)

== See also ==
- List of railway stations in Japan
