= Nishi-koyama Station =

Railway station in Tokyo, Japan

Coordinates: 35.6157°N 139.6989°E

Nishi-koyama Station 西小山駅

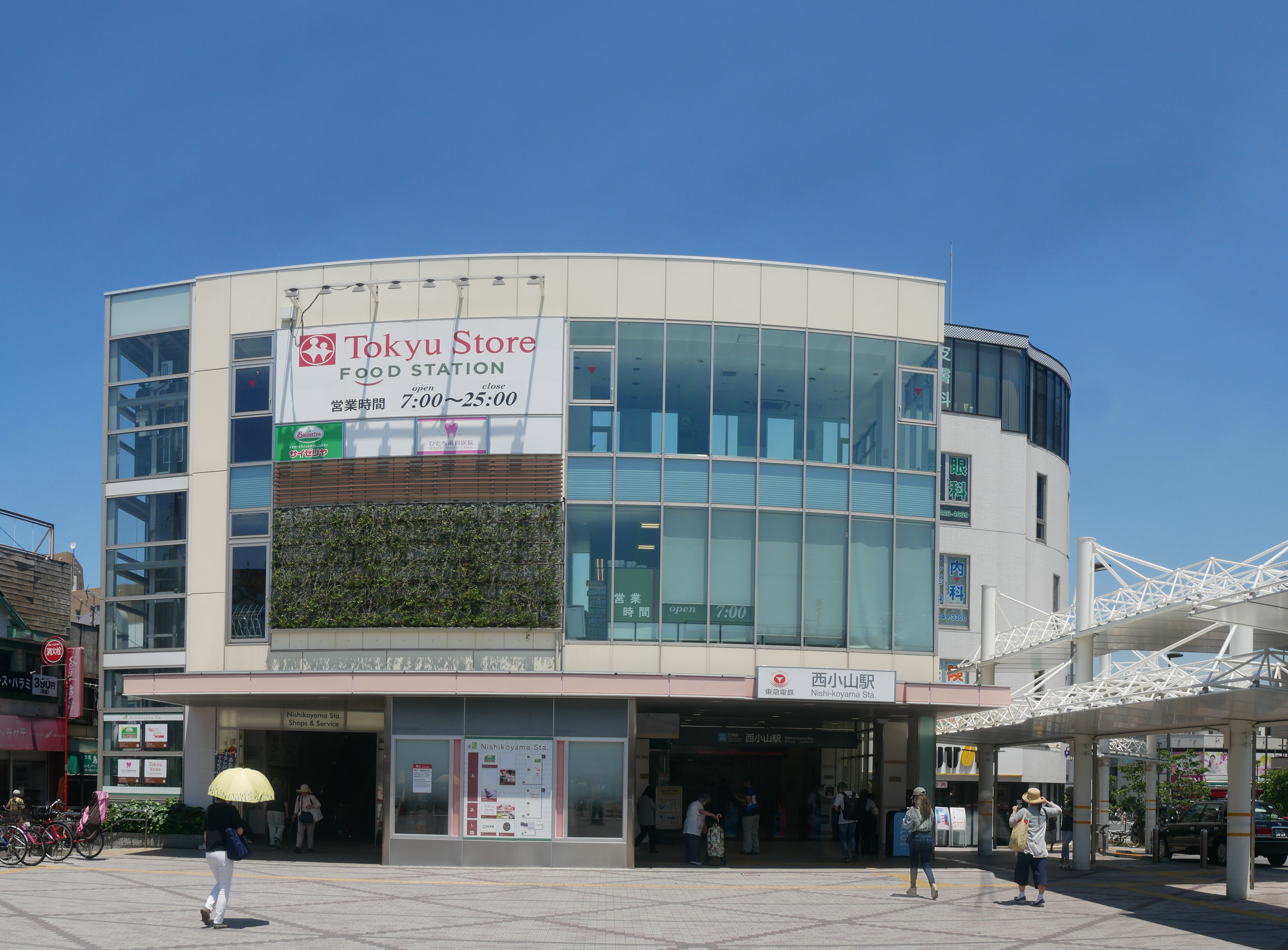
- Station building, May 2019

General information
- Location: 6-3-10 Oyama, Shinagawa Ward, Tokyo; Japan
- Operator: Tōkyū Railways
- Line: Meguro Line
- Platforms: 1 island platform
- Tracks: 2

Construction
- Structure type: Underground

Other information
- Station code: MG04

History
- Opened: 1 August 1928; 98 years ago

Passengers
- 2018: 37,686 daily

Services
Preceding station	Tōkyū Railways	Following station
Senzoku towards Hiyoshi	Meguro Line Local	Musashi-koyama towards Meguro
Location
- Location within Special wards of Tokyo Location within Tokyo Bay and Bōsō Peninsula Location within Tokyo Location within Japan

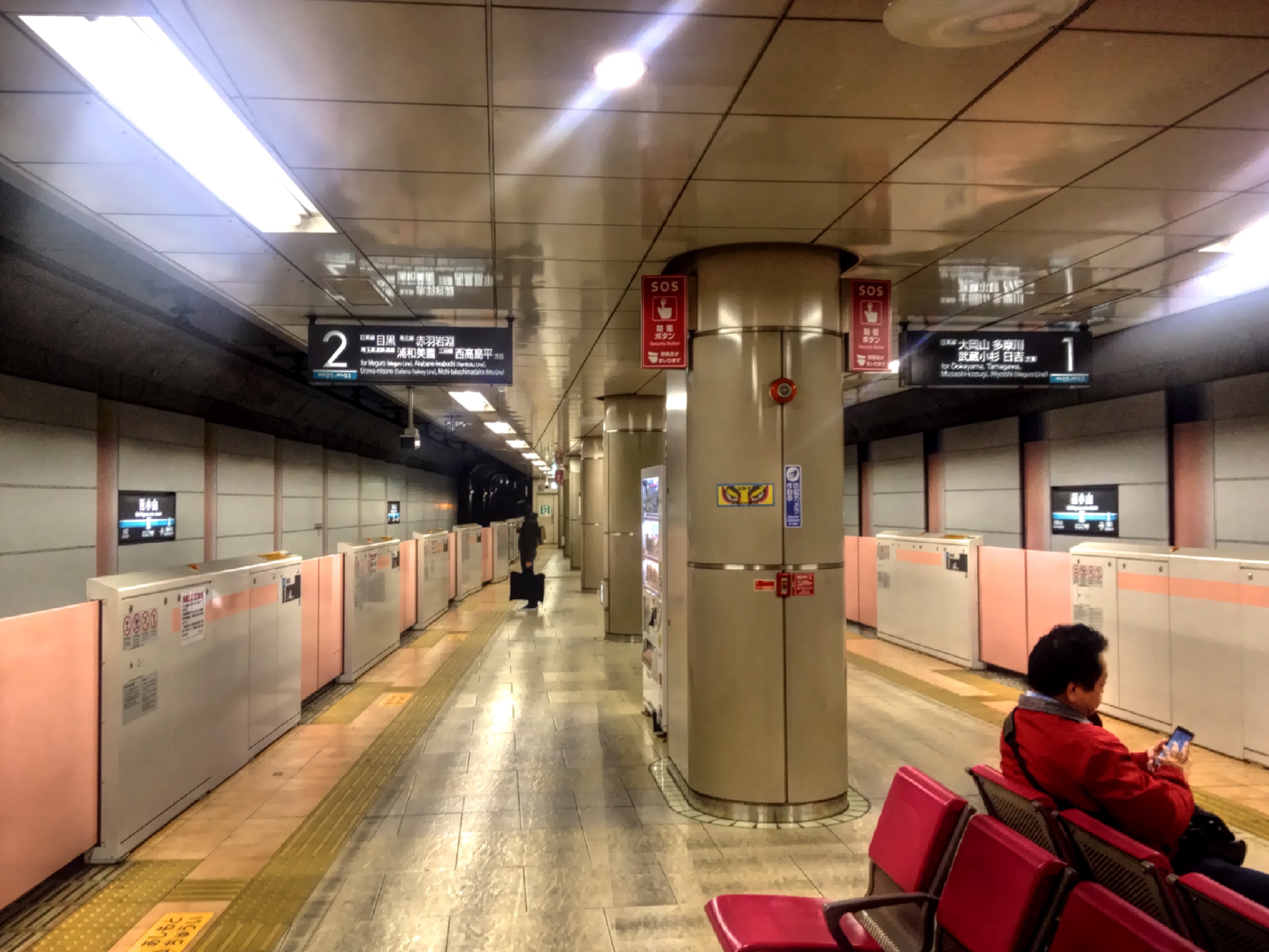
Station platforms, 2017

Nishi-koyama Station (西小山駅, Nishi-koyama eki) is a Tokyu Meguro Line station located in Shinagawa, Tokyo, Japan.

== Station layout ==
This station consists of one island platform serving two tracks. Only local trains stop at this station.

1	■ Tokyu Meguro Line	for Hiyoshi, Shin-Yokohama, and Futamatagawa
2	■ Tokyu Meguro Line	for Meguro, Nishi-takashimadaira, and Akabane-iwabuchi

== Traffic ==
Year	Ridership
2010	33,281
2011	33,670
2012	34,576
2013	35,356
2014	35,397
2015	36,416
2016	37,052
2017	37,508
2018	37,686
2019	37,342

== History ==
- 1 August 1928 - Opening
- 2 July 2006 - Opened as an underground station
