= Okusawa Station =

Railway station in Tokyo, Japan

Coordinates: 35°36′14″N 139°40′20″E

Okusawa Station 奥沢駅

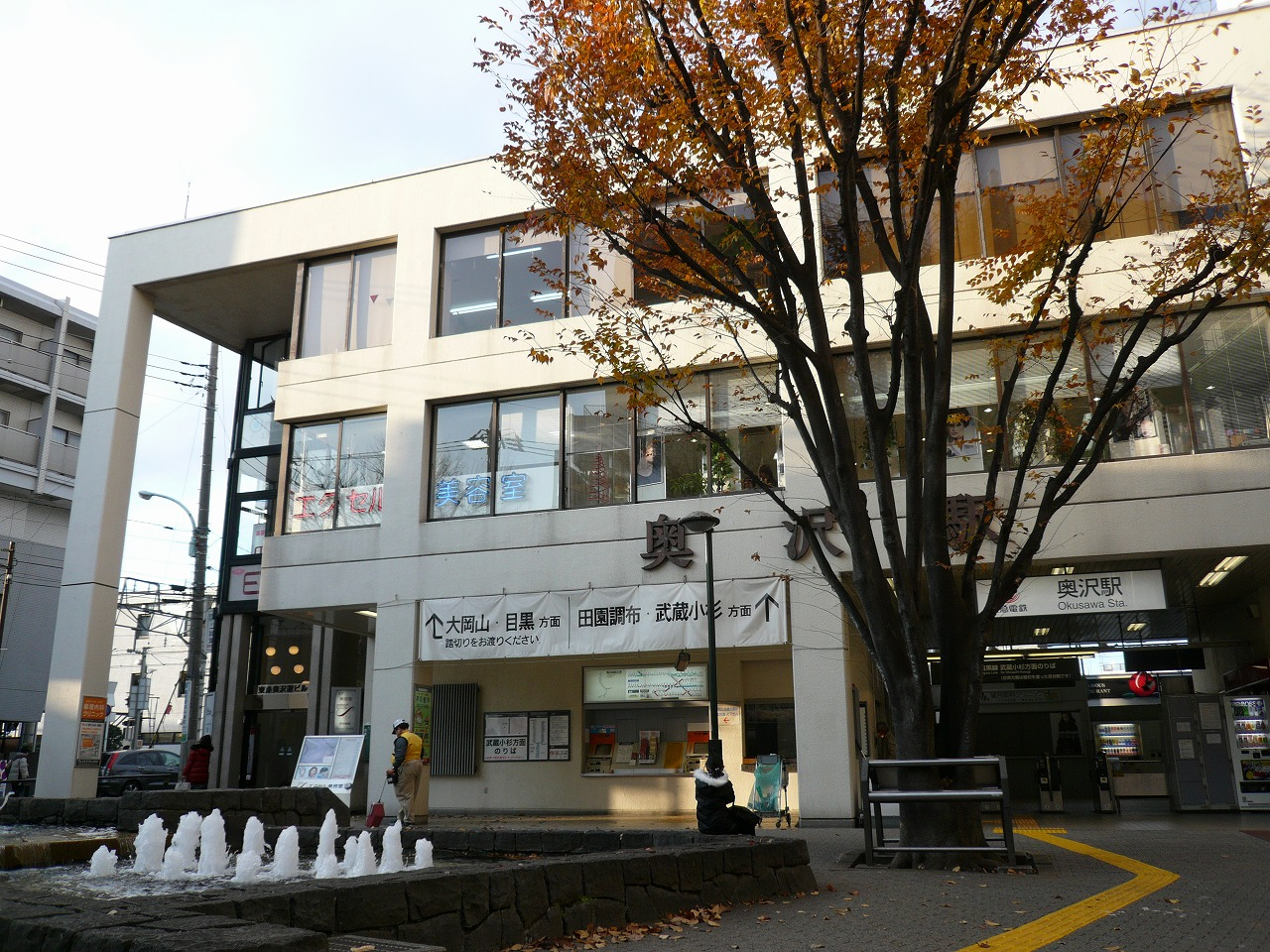
- Station building

General information
- Location: 3-47-17 Okusawa, Setagaya Special Ward, Tokyo; Japan
- Operator: Tōkyū Railways
- Line: Meguro Line
- Platforms: 2 side platforms
- Tracks: 3

Construction
- Structure type: At grade

Other information
- Station code: MG07

History
- Opened: 11 March 1923; 103 years ago

Passengers
- 2018: 14,312 daily

Services
Preceding station	Tōkyū Railways	Following station
Den-en-chōfu towards Hiyoshi	Meguro Line Local	Ōokayama towards Meguro
Location
- Location within Special wards of Tokyo Location within Tokyo Bay and Bōsō Peninsula Location within Tokyo Location within Japan

Okusawa Station (奥沢駅, Okusawa-eki) is a Tokyu Meguro Line station located in Setagaya, Tokyo.

== Station layout ==
The station is at ground floor level, and access to the platforms are by ramps. There are two entrances, one on either side of the level crossing where the line crosses Jiyū-dōri: one for platform 1, the other for platforms 2 and 3. Passengers must choose their direction of travel before passing through the ticket gates, as there is no footbridge or underpass between the platforms.

This station consists of one side platform and one island platform serving three tracks.

1	■ Tokyu Meguro Line	Den-en-chōfu, Musashi-Kosugi, Hiyoshi
2	■ Tokyu Meguro Line	Ō-okayama, Meguro, (Tokyo Metro Namboku Line) Akabane-Iwabuchi (Saitama Rapid) Urawa-Misono (Toei Mita Line) Nishi-Takashimadaira, (through platform)
3	■ Tokyu Meguro Line	starting for Ō-okayama, Meguro, (Tokyo Metro Namboku Line), Akabane-Iwafuchi, (Saitama Rapid) Urawa-Misono (Toei Mita Line) Nishi-Takashimadaira (bay platform)

== History ==
The station opened on March 11, 1923.

== Traffic ==
Year	Ridership
2010	13,058
2011	13,004
2012	13,232
2013	13,664
2014	13,636
2015	13,738
2016	13,879
2017	14,198
2018	14,312
