= Shirokanedai Station =

Metro station in Tokyo, Japan

Coordinates: 35°38′16.81″N 139°43′34.76″E

Shirokanedai Station 白金台駅

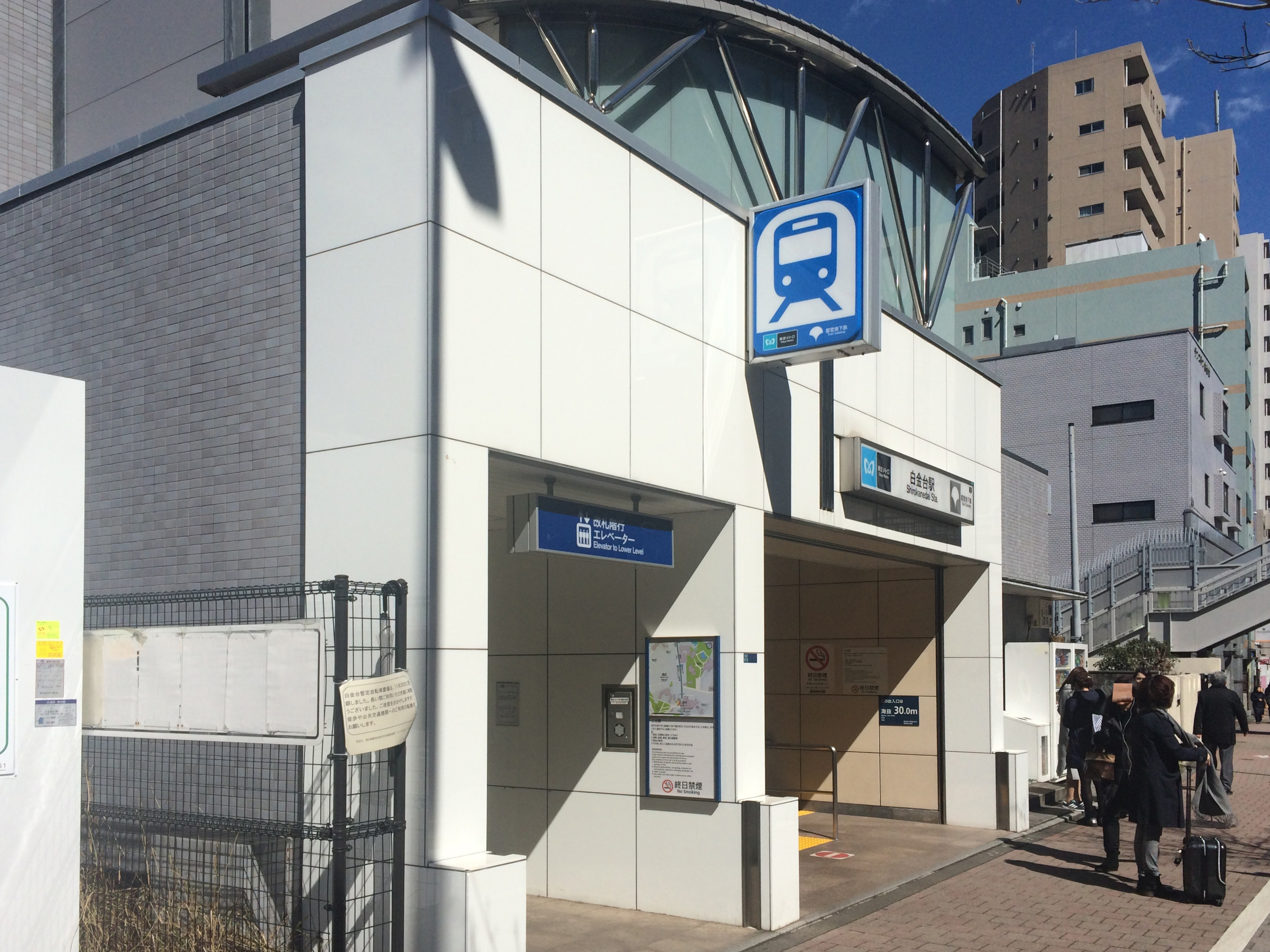
- Exit No. 2 in March 2017

General information
- Location: 4-5-10 Shirokanedai, Minato City, Tokyo; Japan
- System: Tokyo subway
- Owner: Tokyo Metro Co., Ltd. Tokyo Metropolitan Government
- Operator: Tokyo Metro; Toei Subway
- Distance: 1.3 km (0.81 mi) from Meguro
- Platforms: 2 side platforms (shared between the two lines)
- Tracks: 2

Construction
- Structure type: Underground

Other information
- Station code: N-02, I-02

History
- Opened: 26 September 2000; 25 years ago

Services
Preceding station	Tokyo Metro	Following station
Meguro Terminus	Namboku Line	Shirokane-takanawa towards Akabane-iwabuchi
Preceding station	Toei Subway	Following station
Meguro Terminus	Mita Line	Shirokane-takanawa towards Nishi-Takashimadaira
Location
- Location within Tokyo Yamanote Loop Location within Tokyo wards area Location within Japan

Shirokanedai Station (白金台駅, Shirokanedai-eki) is a subway station in Minato, Tokyo, operated jointly by the Tokyo subway operators Tokyo Metro and Tokyo Metropolitan Bureau of Transportation (Toei).

== Lines ==
Shirokanedai Station is served by the Tokyo Metro Namboku Line (station number N-02) and the Toei Mita Line (station number I-02), and lies 1.3 km (0.81 mi) from the starting point of both lines at Meguro Station and a kilometer away from Shirokane-takanawa Station. It is the least used station on the Toei Subway network, with 5,070 boardings per day in 2018.

== Station layout ==
The station has two underground side platforms on the fourth basement ("B4F") level, serving two tracks shared by both Tokyo Metro Namboku Line and the Toei Mita Line services.

=== Platforms ===
1
Namboku Line
for Iidabashi, Komagome, and Akabane-iwabuchi
Saitama Rapid Railway Line for Urawa-misono
Mita Line
for Sugamo and Nishi-takashimadaira
2
Namboku Line
- for Meguro
- Meguro Line for Musashi-Kosugi and Hiyoshi
- Sotetsu Main Line for Ebina via the Tokyu/Sotetsu Shin-Yokohama Line
- Sotetsu Izumino Line for Shōnandai via the Tokyu/Sotetsu Shin-Yokohama Line
Mita Line

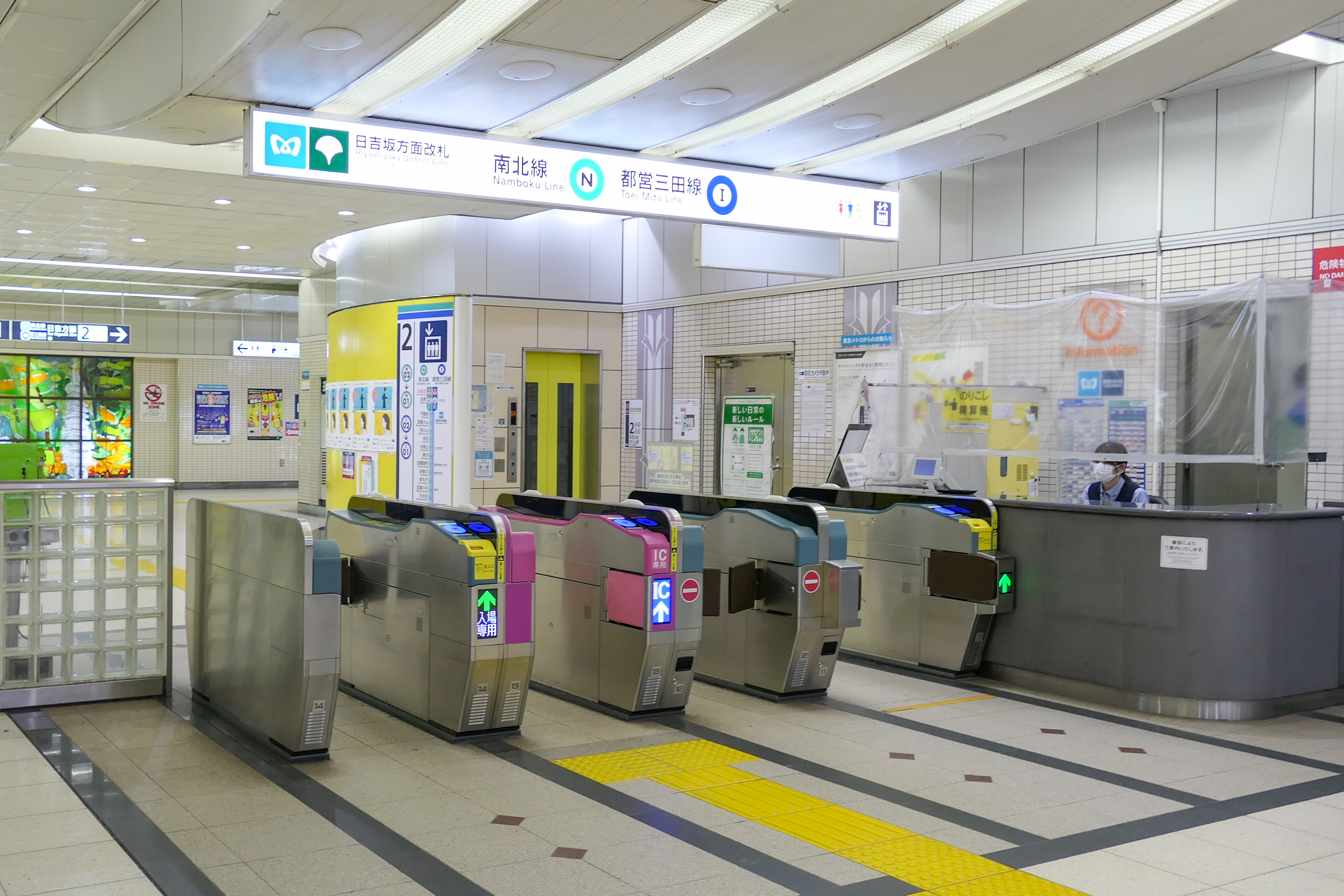
Ticket gates

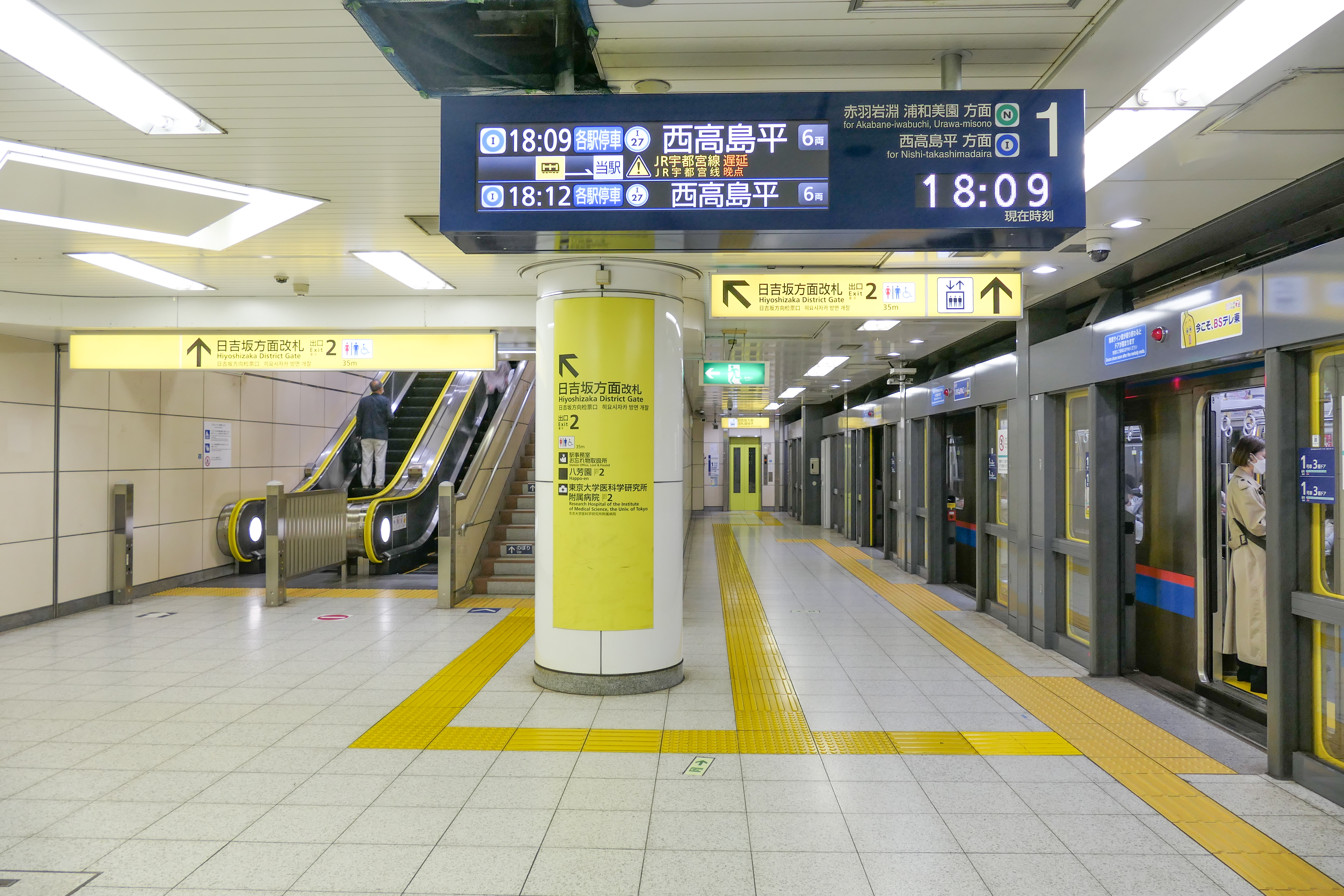
Platform 1

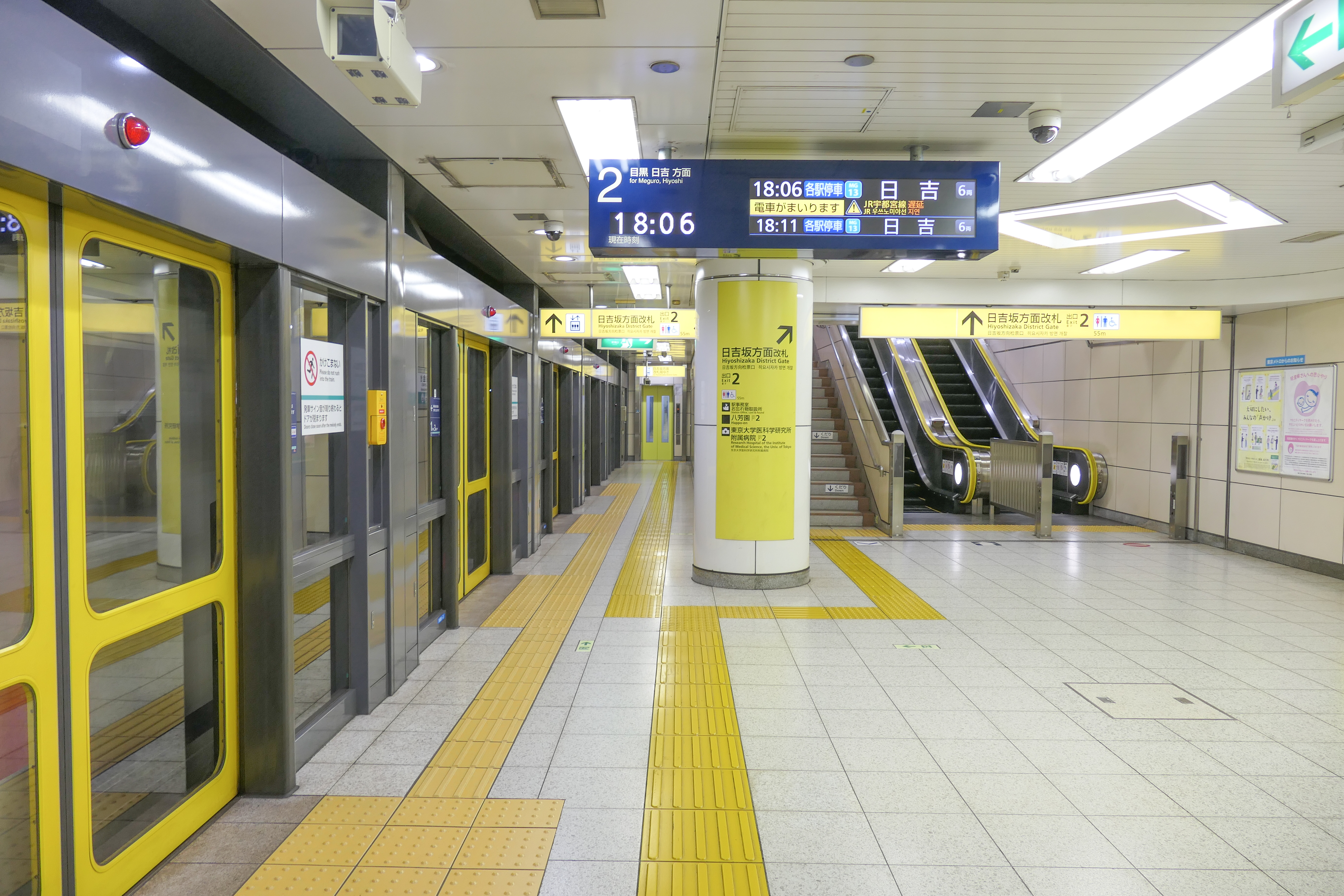
Platform 2

== History ==
Shirokanedai Station opened on 26 September 2000.

The station facilities of the Namboku Line were inherited by Tokyo Metro after the privatization of the Teito Rapid Transit Authority (TRTA) in 2004.

== Surrounding area ==
- Meiji Gakuin University Shirokane Campus
- Meiji Gakuin Senior High School
- Institute of Medical Science
- The Institute for Nature Study
- Matsuoka Museum

== See also ==
- List of railway stations in Japan
