= Musashi-koyama Station =

Railway station in Tokyo, Japan

Coordinates: 35.6203°N 139.7047°E

Musashi-koyama Station 武蔵小山駅

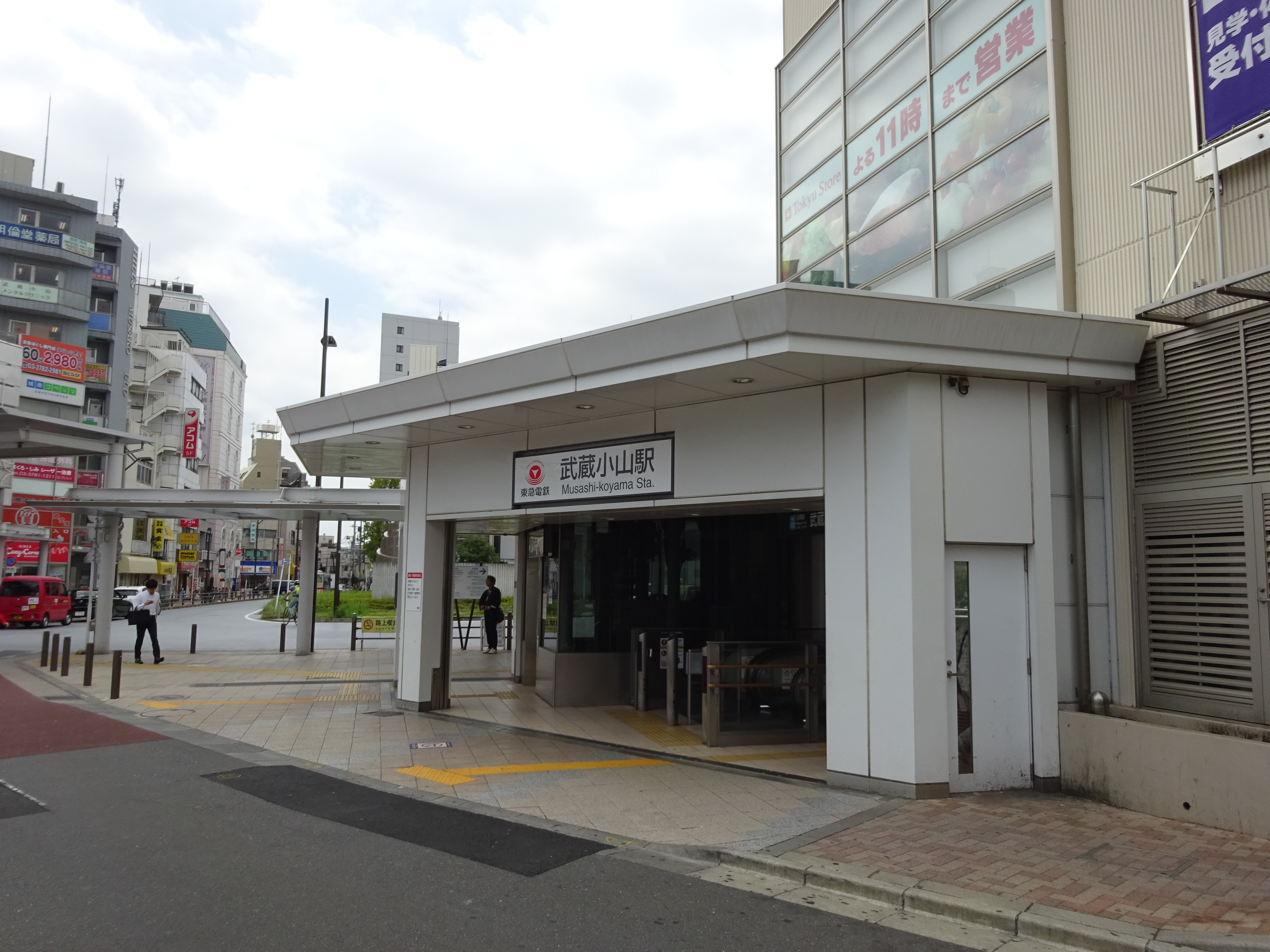
- The east entrance in August 2016

General information
- Location: 3-4-8 Koyama, Shinagawa, Tokyo; Japan
- Operator: Tōkyū Railways
- Line: Meguro Line
- Distance: 2.6 km (1.6 mi) from Meguro
- Platforms: 2 island platforms
- Tracks: 4

Construction
- Structure type: Underground

Other information
- Station code: MG03
- Website: Official website

History
- Opened: 11 March 1923; 103 years ago
- Rebuilt: 2 July 2006; 20 years ago
- Former names: Koyama (until June 1924)

Passengers
- FY2018: 53,952 daily

Services
Preceding station	Tōkyū Railways	Following station
Ōokayama towards Hiyoshi	Meguro Line Express	Meguro Terminus
Nishi-koyama towards Hiyoshi	Meguro Line Local	Fudō-mae towards Meguro
Location
- Location within Special wards of Tokyo Location within Tokyo Bay and Bōsō Peninsula Location within Tokyo Location within Japan

Musashi-koyama Station (武蔵小山駅, Musashi-koyama-eki) is a railway station on the Tokyu Meguro Line in Shinagawa, Tokyo, Japan, operated by the private railway operator Tokyu Corporation.

== Lines ==
Musashi-koyama Station is served by the Tokyu Meguro Line, and lies 2.6 km from the starting point of the line at Meguro.

== Station layout ==
This station has two island platforms serving four tracks. Local trains typically use tracks 1 and 4, while express trains use tracks 2 and 3.

=== Platforms ===
1/2	Tokyu Meguro Line	for Ōokayama, Den-en-chōfu, Musashi-Kosugi, and Hiyoshi; Tōkyū Shin-yokohama Line for Shin-Yokohama; Sōtetsu Main Line for Ebina via the Tōkyū/Sōtetsu Shin-yokohama Line
3/4	Tokyu Meguro Line	for Meguro; Tokyo Metro Namboku Line for Akabane-Iwabuchi; Saitama Rapid Railway Line for Urawa-Misono; Toei Mita Line for Nishi-takashimadaira

== History ==
The station opened on 11 March 1923, initially named simply Koyama Station (小山駅). It was renamed Musashi-koyama in June 1924.

The station was rebuilt as an underground station, reopening on 2 July 2006.

== Passenger statistics ==
Year	Ridership
2010	46,733
2011	47,425
2012	48,848
2013	50,999
2014	51,337
2015	52,142
2016	52,369
2017	53,186
2018	53,952

== Surrounding area ==
- Hoshi University

== See also ==
- List of railway stations in Japan
