= Fudō-mae Station =

Railway station in Tokyo, Japan

Coordinates: 35.6256°N 139.7134°E

Fudō-mae Station 不動前駅

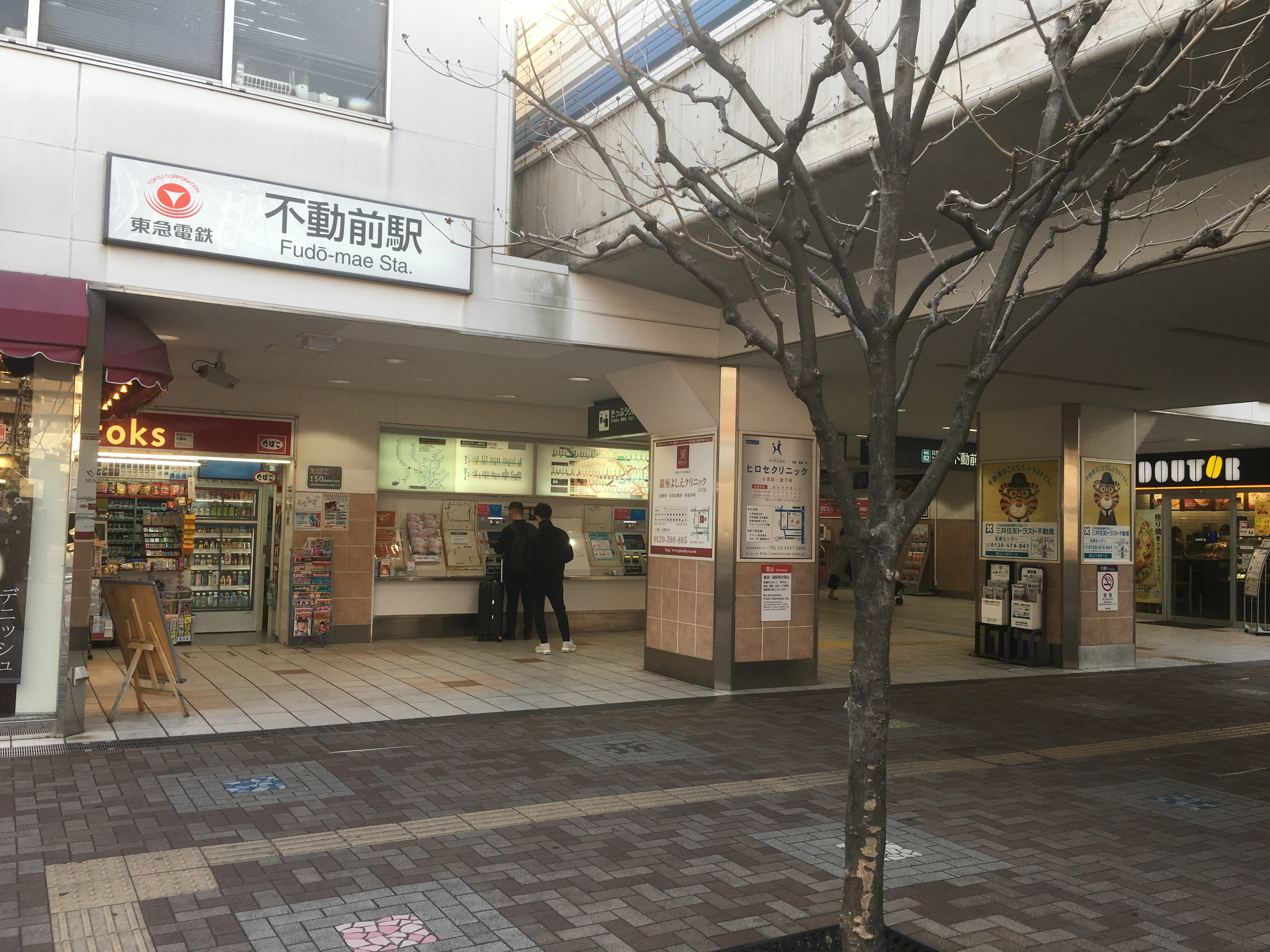
- The station entrance in March 2019

General information
- Location: Shinagawa, Tokyo; Japan
- Operator: Tōkyū Railways
- Line: Meguro Line
- Platforms: 2 side platforms
- Tracks: 2

Construction
- Structure type: Elevated

Other information
- Station code: MG02

History
- Opened: 11 March 1923; 103 years ago
- Former names: Megurofudōmae (until October 1923)

Passengers
- FY2018: 31,317 daily

Services
Preceding station	Tōkyū Railways	Following station
Musashi-koyama towards Hiyoshi	Meguro Line Local	Meguro Terminus
Location
- Location within Special wards of Tokyo Location within Tokyo Bay and Bōsō Peninsula Location within Tokyo Location within Japan

Fudō-mae Station (不動前駅, Fudō-mae-eki) is a railway station on the Tokyu Meguro Line in Shinagawa, Tokyo, Japan, operated by the private railway operator Tokyu Corporation.

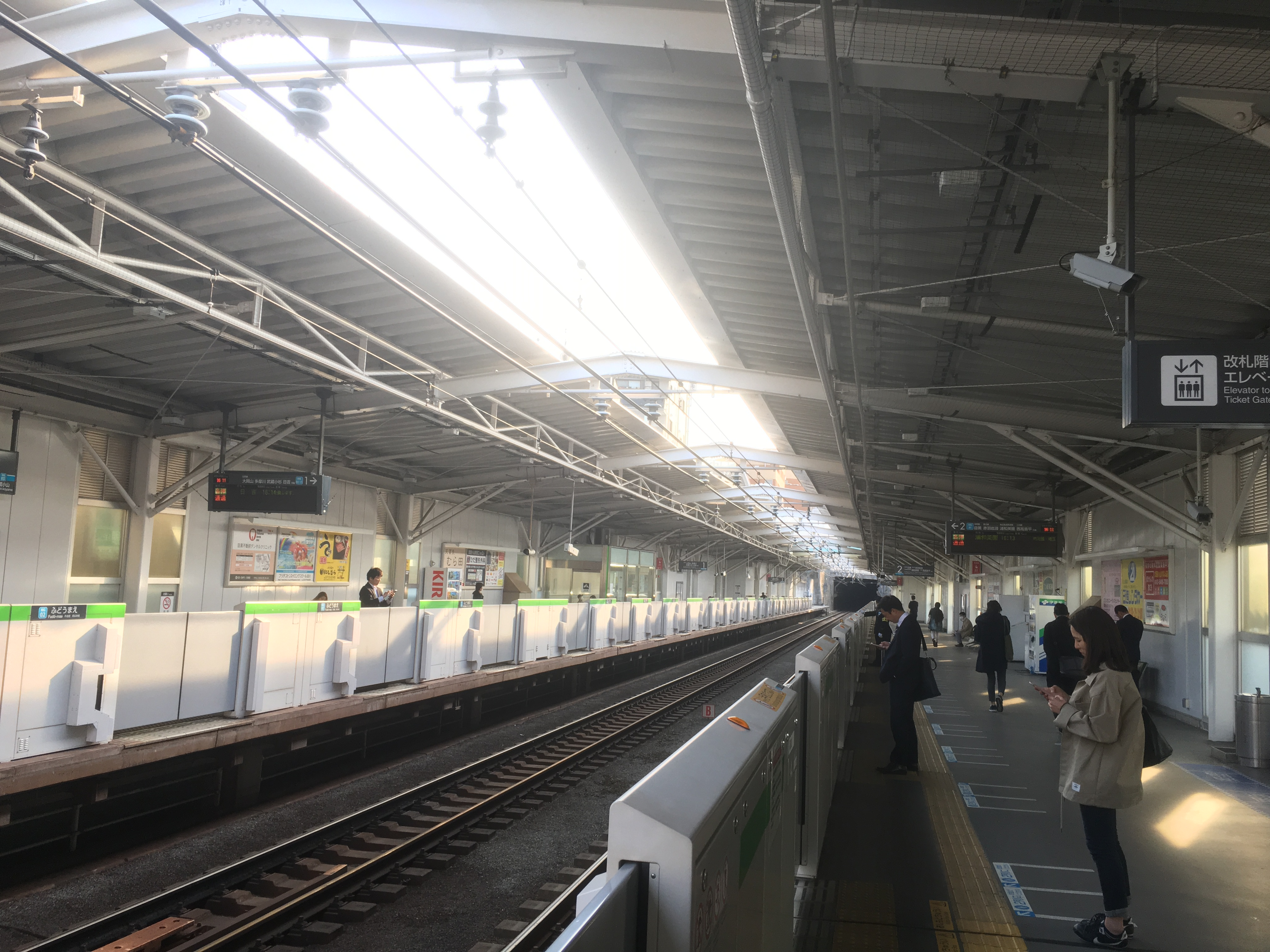
Station platforms, 2019

== Lines ==
Fudō-mae Station is served by the Tokyu Meguro Line. Only "Local" all-stations trains stop at this station.

== Station layout ==
This station consists of two opposed side platforms serving two tracks. Only local trains stop at this station.

1	■ Tokyu Meguro Line	for Den-en-chōfu, Hiyoshi, Shin-Yokohama and Futamatagawa
2	■ Tokyu Meguro Line	for Meguro, Nishi-takashimadaira, and Akabane-iwabuchi

== History ==
The station opened on March 11, 1923 as Megurofudōmae Station (目黒不動前駅) when the Meguro Kamata Railway started its operation between Meguro Station and Maruko Station (present-day Numabe Station). The station was renamed Fudō-mae in October 1923.

== Ridership ==
Year	Ridership
2010	27,426
2011	27,871
2012	28,519
2013	28,918
2014	28,909
2015	29,492
2016	29,964
2017	30,805
2018	31,317

== See also ==
- List of railway stations in Japan
