= Den-en-chōfu Station =

Railway station in Tokyo, Japan

Coordinates: 35°35′49″N 139°40′02″E

Den-en-chōfu Station 田園調布駅

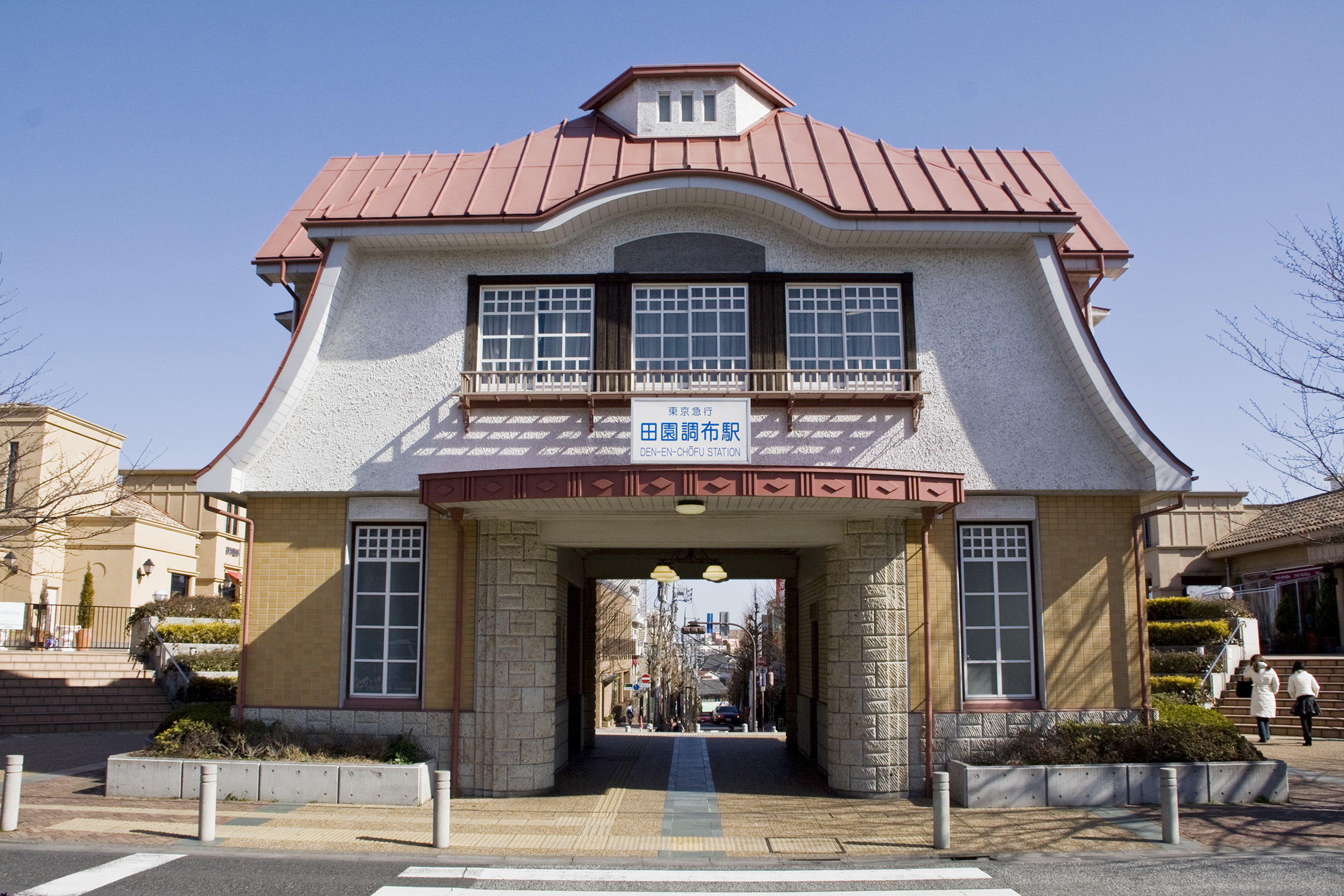
- Den-en-chōfu Station, March 2010

General information
- Location: 3-25-18 Den-en-chōfu, Ōta, Tokyo （東京都大田区田園調布3-25-18） Japan
- Operator: Tōkyū Railways
- Lines: Meguro Line; Tōyoko Line
- Platforms: 2 island platforms
- Tracks: 4

Construction
- Structure type: Underground

Other information
- Station code: TY08, MG08

History
- Opened: 11 March 1923; 103 years ago

Services
Preceding station	Tōkyū Railways	Following station
Tamagawa towards Yokohama	Tōyoko Line Express Local	Jiyūgaoka towards Shibuya
Tamagawa towards Hiyoshi	Meguro Line Express	Ōokayama towards Meguro
Tamagawa towards Hiyoshi	Meguro Line Local	Okusawa towards Meguro
Location
- Location within Special wards of Tokyo Location within Tokyo Bay and Bōsō Peninsula Location within Tokyo Location within Japan

Den-en-chōfu Station (田園調布駅, Den'en Chōfu-eki) is a railway station in Ōta, Tokyo, Japan, operated by the private railway operator Tokyu Corporation.

== Lines ==
Den-en-chōfu Station is served by the Tokyu Toyoko Line and Tokyu Meguro Line. It is roughly a 15-minute train journey from Shibuya Station.

== Station layout ==
This station consists of two island platforms serving four tracks.

=== Platforms ===
1
Tokyu Toyoko Line
- for Musashi-Kosugi, Kikuna, and Yokohama
- Minatomirai Line for Motomachi-Chūkagai
- Sōtetsu Izumino Line for Shōnandai via the Tōkyū/Sōtetsu Shin-yokohama Line
2
Tokyu Meguro Line
- for Musashi-Kosugi and Hiyoshi
- Tōkyū Shin-yokohama Line for Shin-Yokohama
- Sōtetsu Main Line for Ebina via the Tōkyū/Sōtetsu Shin-yokohama Line
3
Tokyu Meguro Line
for Ōokayama and Meguro
Namboku Line for Akabane-iwabuchi
Saitama Rapid Railway Line for Urawa-misono
Mita Line for Nishi-takashimadaira
4
Tokyu Toyoko Line
for Jiyūgaoka, Naka-Meguro, and Shibuya
Fukutoshin Line for Shinjuku-sanchome, Ikebukuro, Kotake-mukaihara, and Wakoshi
Seibu Ikebukuro Line for Hannō
Tōbu Tōjō Line for Shinrinkōen

== History ==
The station opened on 28 August 1923.

== Surrounding area ==
The station is situated in Den-en-chōfu, within the Ōta ward of suburban Tokyo. This was one of the original garden suburbs of Tokyo, running along the Tama River. The design of the town was heavily influenced by Sir Ebenezer Howard's Garden Cities of To-morrow (London 1898/1902). The original 1920s station building was torn down in the late 1980s to make way for the new modern station building. In a nod to its past and in order to retain its unique identity, a copy of the original building was constructed on elevated ground and now acts as an entranceway to the plaza in front of the subway station entrance.
