= Meguro Line =

Railway line in Tokyo, Japan

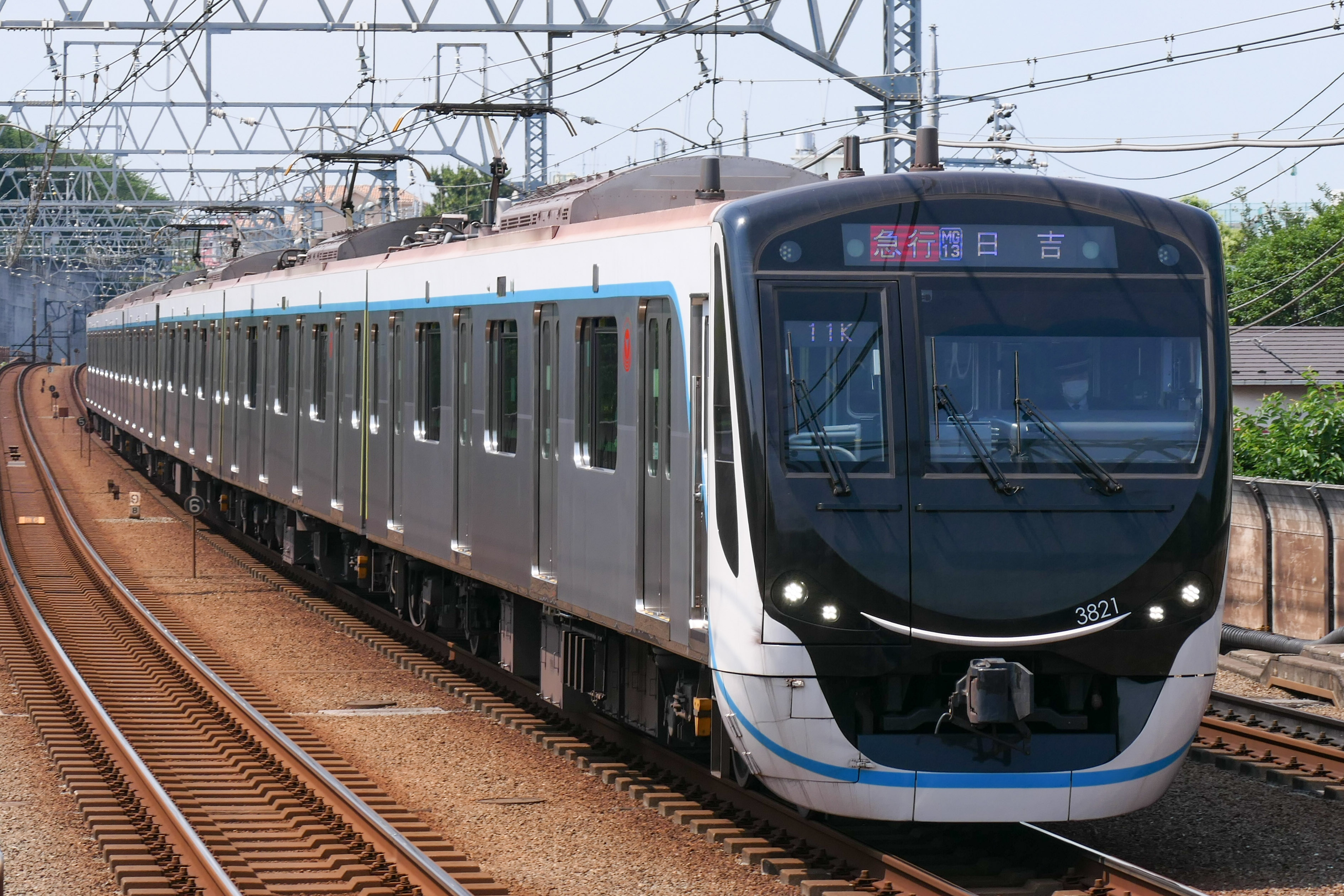
- A Tokyu 3020 series train on the Meguro Line

Overview
- Native name: 目黒線
- Status: In service
- Owner: Tokyu Corporation
- Line number: MG
- Locale: Tokyo; Kanagawa
- Termini: Hiyoshi; Meguro
- Stations: 13
- Color on map: Sky Blue (#009bd8)

Service
- Type: Commuter rail
- System: Tokyu Railways
- Operator(s): Tokyu Corporation
- Daily ridership: 388,982 (FY 2018)

History
- Opened: March 11, 1923; 103 years ago

Technical
- Line length: 11.9 km (7.4 mi)
- Track gauge: 1,067 mm (3 ft 6 in)
- Electrification: 1,500 V DC overhead catenary

The Meguro Line (目黒線, Tōkyū-Meguro-sen) is a railway line operated by Japanese private railway company Tokyu Corporation. As a railway line, the name is for the section between Meguro and Den-en-chōfu in southwest Tokyo, but nearly all trains run to Hiyoshi on a quad-tracked section of the Tōyoko Line in Yokohama, Kanagawa. Additionally, the Meguro line interoperates with the Tokyo Metro Namboku Line and Toei Mita Line beyond Meguro.

== History ==
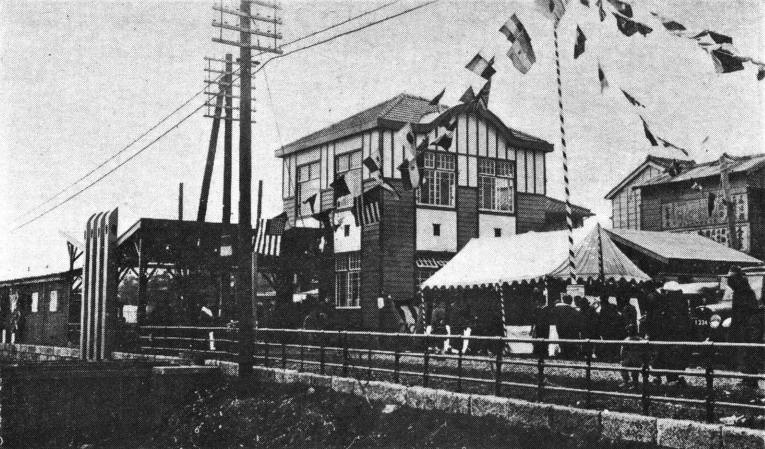
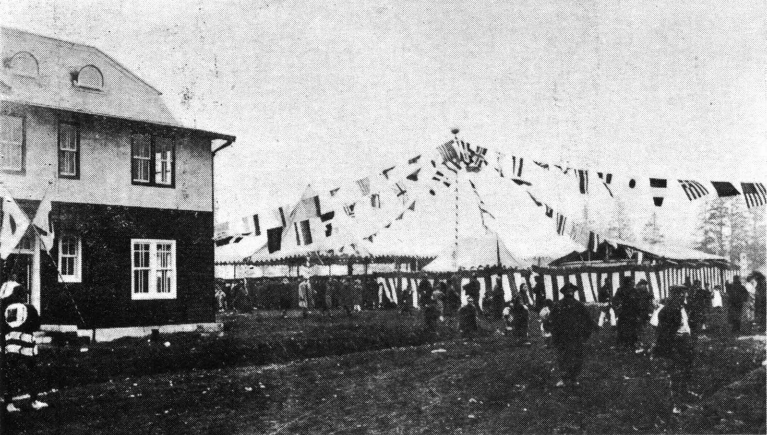
Opening ceremony at Senzoku, 1923.
- 1923:
  - March 11: The line opens as the Meguro Line between Meguro and Maruko (now Numabe) (on the current Tamagawa Line).
  - October: Meguro-Fudōmae station is renamed to Fudōmae station.
  - November 1: The line is extended from Maruko to Kamata, and the line is renamed to the Mekama line.
- 1924, June 1: Koyama becomes Musashi-Koyama.
- 1926, January 1: Chōfu and Tamagawa stations are renamed to Den-en-Chōfu and Maruko-Tamagawa stations respectively.
- 1928, August 1: Nishi-Koyama station opens.
- 1931, January 1: Maruko-Tamagawa station is renamed again to Tamagawa-en-mae station.
- 1977, December 16: Tamagawa-en-mae station is renamed yet again to Tamagawa-en station.
- 1994, November 27: Den-en-Chōfu station moves underground.
- 1997:
  - June 27: Ōokayama station moves underground.
  - July 27: Meguro station moves underground.
- 1999, October 10: Fudōmae station is elevated.
- 2000:
  - August 6: Service is split into two services, Meguro - Musashi-Kosugi and Tamagawa - Kamata. Tamagawa-en station is renamed to Tamagawa station and one-man operation begins.
  - September 26: Through service begins with the Tokyo Metro Namboku and Toei Mita Lines.
- 2001, March 28: Through service begins with the Saitama Rapid Railway line via the Namboku line.
- 2006:
  - July 2: As part of a grade separation project between Fudōmae and Senzoku, Musashi-Koyama and Nishi-Koyama stations move underground.
  - September 25: Express service commences.
- 2008 June 22: Service extended to Hiyoshi.
- 2022 April: Eight-car trains commence operation on the line. Platforms on Meguro Line were lengthened in order to accommodate 8-car trainsets and allow through services with Sōtetsu Shin-yokohama Line.
- 2023 March 18: The through service onto the Sōtetsu Shin-yokohama Line began service via the Tōkyū Shin-yokohama Line, allowing the line to connect with the Tokaido Shinkansen line. Since then, most express trains no longer terminate at Hiyoshi but instead either Shin-yokohama, Nishiya, Shōnandai, Yamato or Ebina. The majority of local trains still terminate at Hiyoshi.

== Stations ==
No.	Station	Japanese	Distance (km)		Local	Express	Transfers	Location	
No.	Station	Japanese	Between Stations	Total	Local	Express	Transfers	Location	
↑ Through-running to/from↑: Namboku Line towards Urawa-misono via the Saitama Railway Line; Mita Line towards Nishi-takashimadaira
MG-01	Meguro	目黒	-	0.0	O	O	Yamanote Line (JY22); Namboku Line (N-01; through service); Mita Line (I-01; through service)	Shinagawa	Tokyo
MG-02	Fudō-mae	不動前	1.0	1.0	O	｜		Shinagawa	Tokyo
MG-03	Musashi-koyama	武蔵小山	0.9	1.9	O	O		Shinagawa	Tokyo
MG-04	Nishi-koyama	西小山	0.7	2.6	O	｜		Shinagawa	Tokyo
MG-05	Senzoku	洗足	0.7	3.3	O	｜		Meguro	Tokyo
MG-06	Ōokayama	大岡山	1.0	4.3	O	O	Ōimachi Line (OM08)	Ōta	Tokyo
MG-07	Okusawa	奥沢	1.2	5.5	O	｜		Setagaya	Tokyo
MG-08	Den-en-chōfu	田園調布	1.0	6.5	O	O	Tōyoko Line (TY08)	Ōta	Tokyo
MG-09	Tamagawa	多摩川	0.8	7.3	O	O	Tōyoko Line (TY09); Tōkyū Tamagawa Line (TM01)	Ōta	Tokyo
MG-10	Shin-maruko	新丸子	1.3	8.6	O	｜	Tōyoko Line (TY10)	Nakahara-ku, Kawasaki	Kanagawa
MG-11	Musashi-kosugi	武蔵小杉	0.5	9.1	O	O	Tōyoko Line (TY11); Nambu Line (JN07); Yokosuka Line (JO15); Shōnan–Shinjuku Line (JS15); Sōtetsu–JR Link Line (JS15)	Nakahara-ku, Kawasaki	Kanagawa
MG-12	Motosumiyoshi	元住吉	1.3	10.0	O	｜	Tōyoko Line (TY12)	Nakahara-ku, Kawasaki	Kanagawa
MG-13 SH-03	Hiyoshi	日吉	1.5	11.9	O	O	Tōyoko Line (TY13); Tōkyū Shin-Yokohama Line (SH03; through service); Green Line (G10)	Kōhoku-ku, Yokohama	Kanagawa
↓ Through-running to/from ↓: Tōkyū Shin-Yokohama Line for Shin-Yokohama; Sōtetsu Main Line for Ebina; Sōtetsu Izumino Line for Shōnandai (via Futamata-gawa on the Sōtetsu Main Line)

== Ridership ==
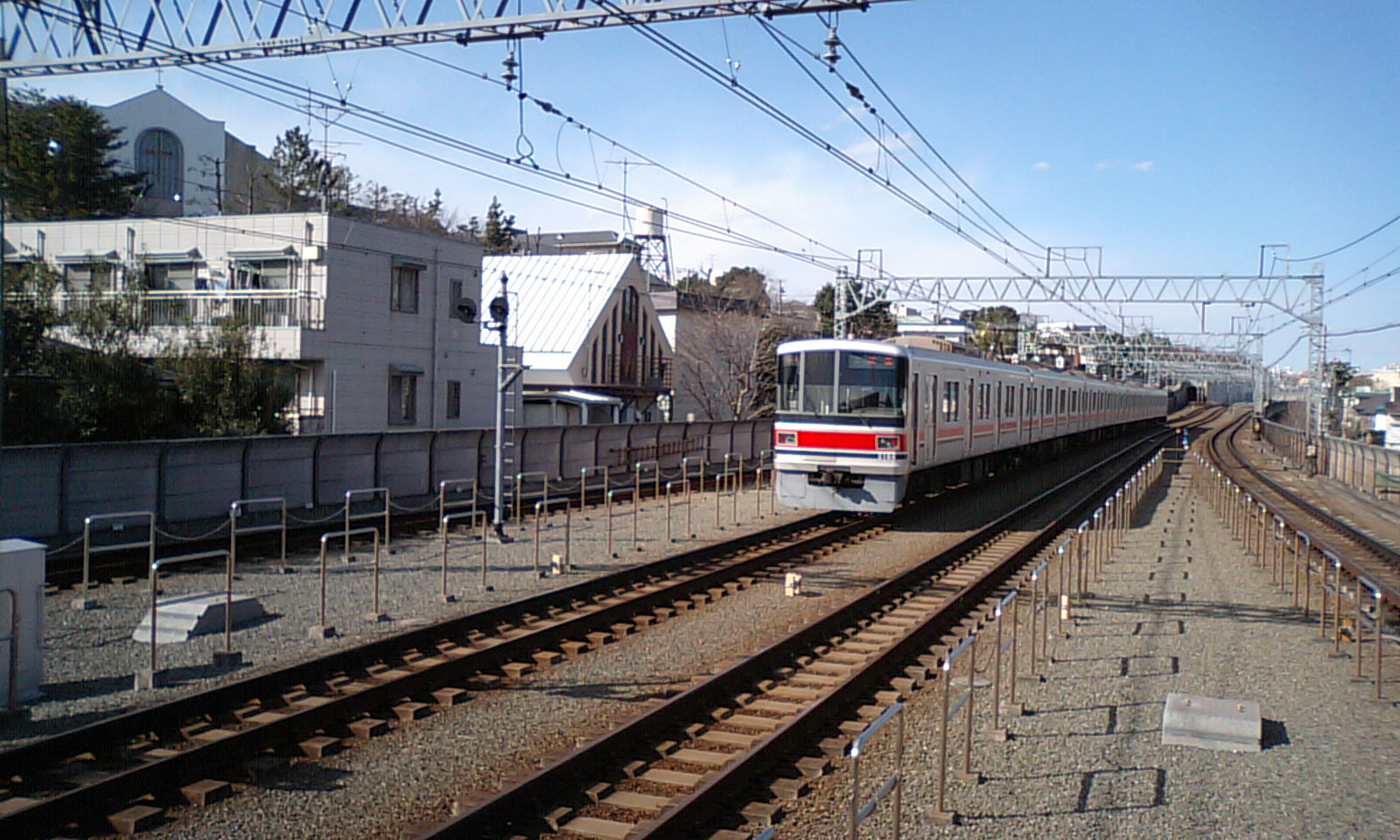
Meguro Line tracks run parallel with the Tōyoko Line between Den-en-chōfu and Hiyoshi stations (inside tracks - Meguro Line, outside tracks - Tōyoko Line)

Year	Ridership
2010	321,677
2011	324,052
2012	332,590
2013	342,041
2014	347,884
2015	358,274
2016	368,386
2017	379,212
2018	388,982

== Rolling stock ==
=== Tokyu ===
- 3000 series 8-car EMUs
- 3020 series 8-car EMUs
- 5080 series 8-car EMUs

=== Other operators ===
- Toei 6300 series 6-car EMUs (Toei Mita Line)
- Toei 6500 series 8-car EMUs (Toei Mita Line)
- Tokyo Metro 9000 series 6/8-car EMUs (Tokyo Metro Namboku Line)
- Saitama Rapid Railway 2000 series 6-car EMUs (Saitama Rapid Railway Line)
- Sotetsu 21000 series 8-car EMUs (Sōtetsu Main Line or Sōtetsu Izumino Line, via the Sōtetsu Shin-Yokohama Line)
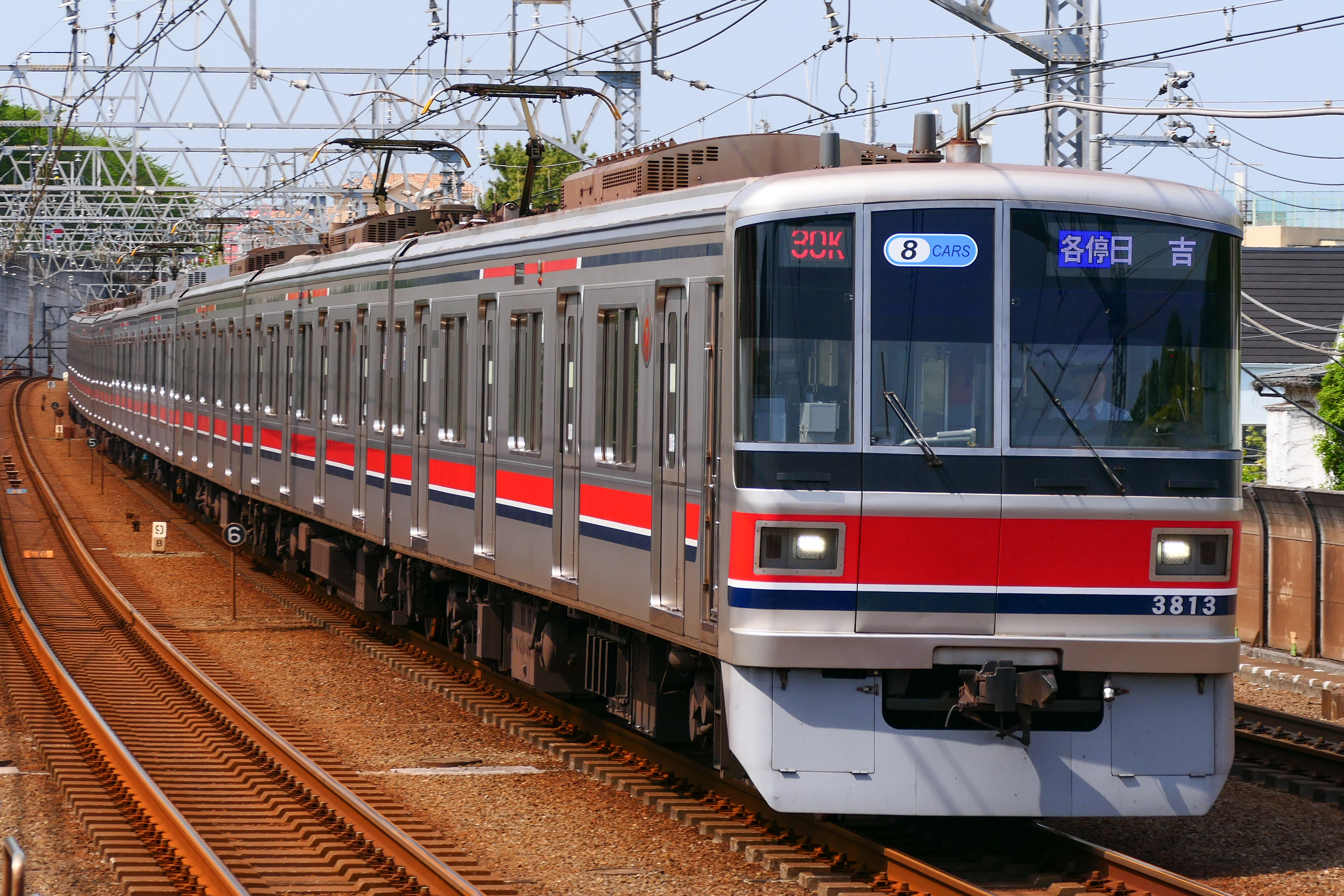
Tokyu 3000 series

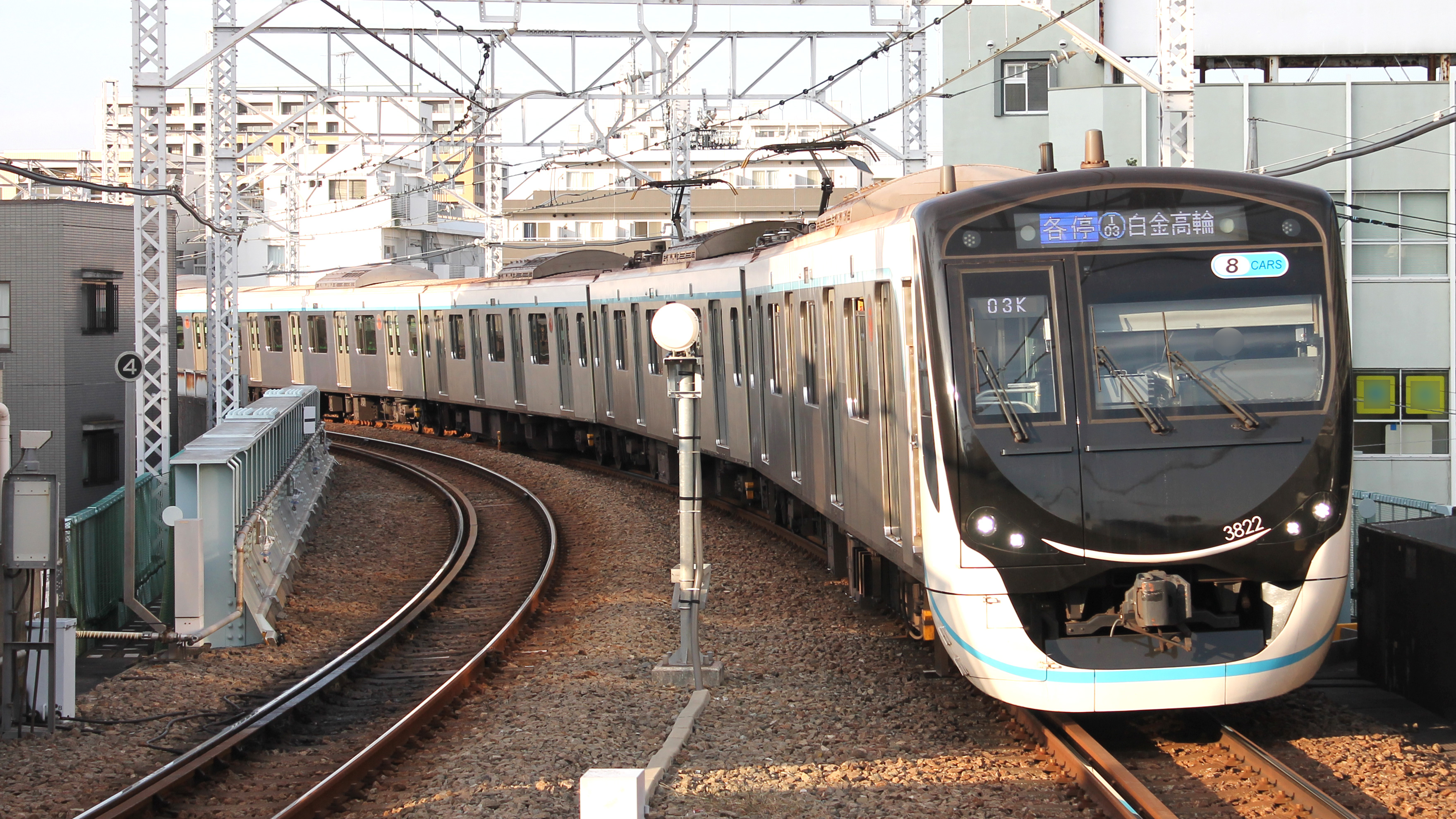
Tokyu 3020 series

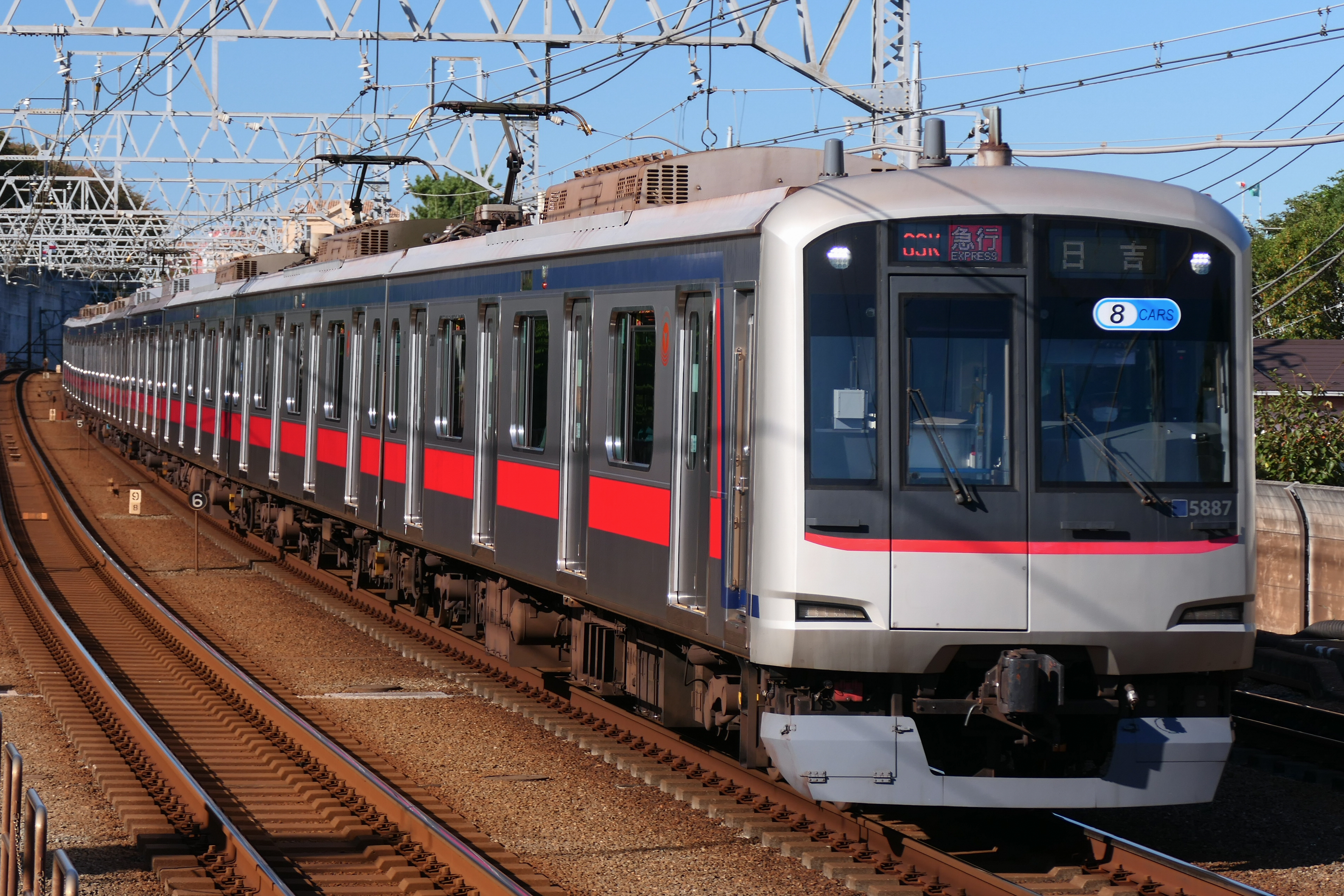
Tokyu 5080 series

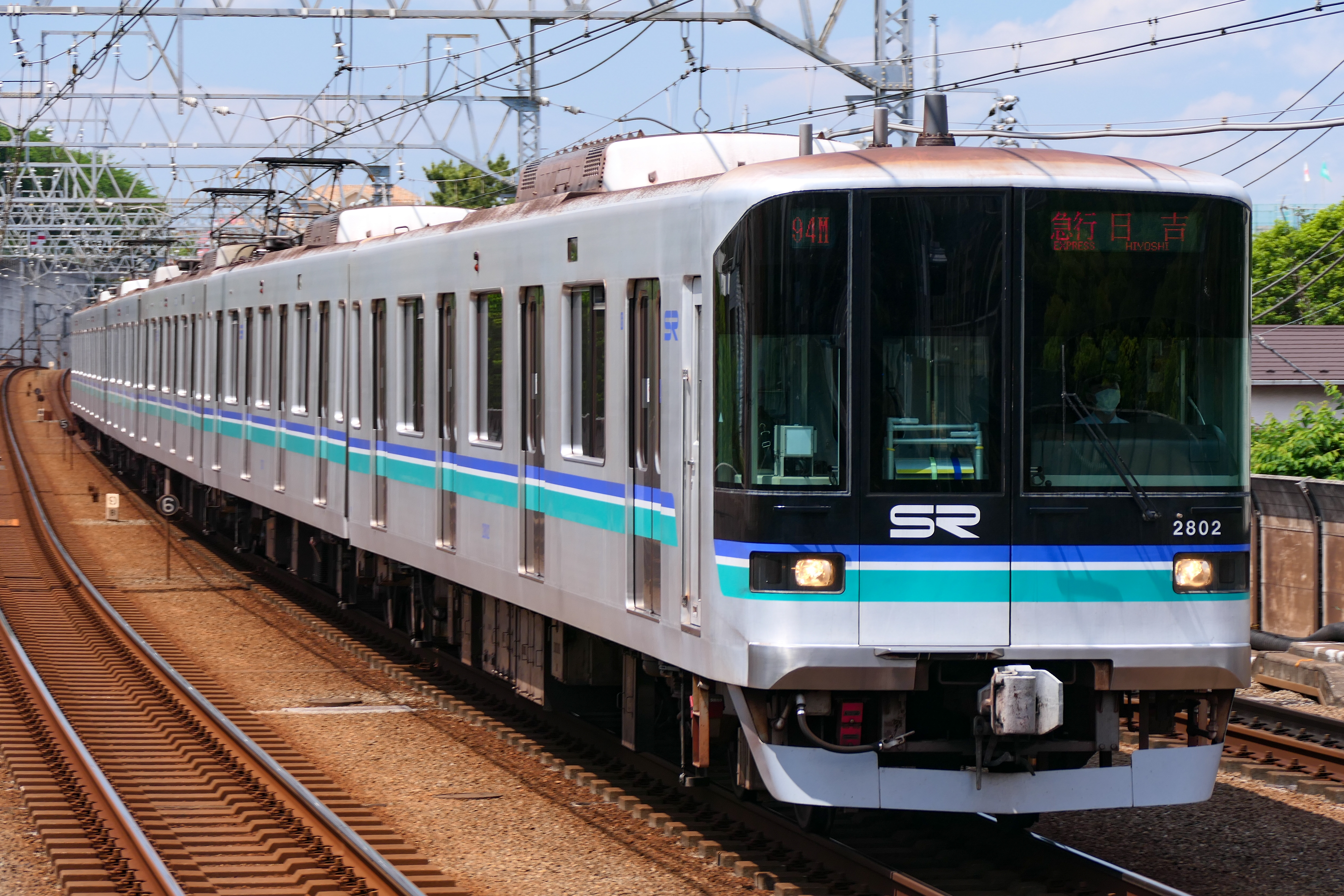
Saitama Rapid Railway 2000 series

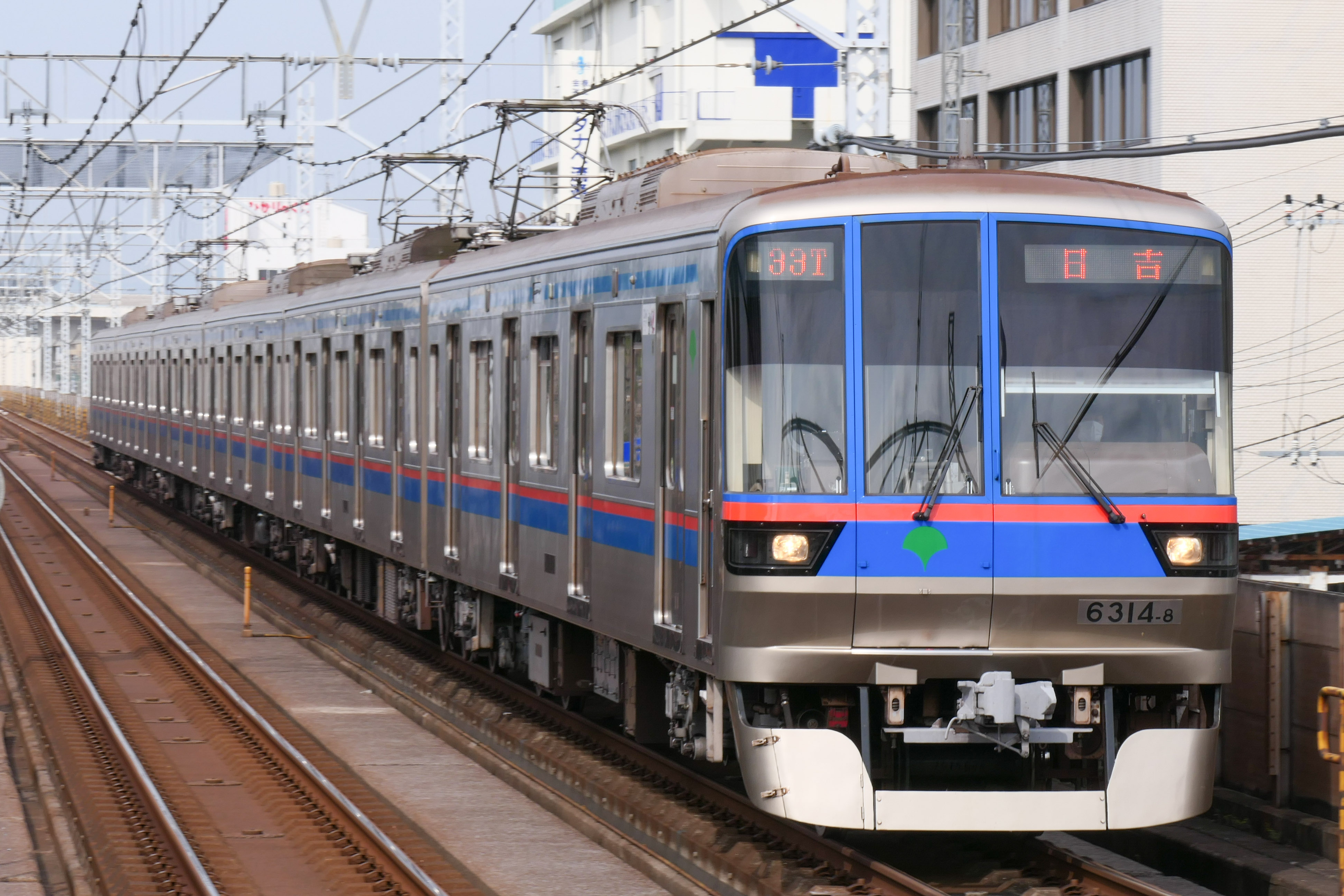
Toei 6300 series

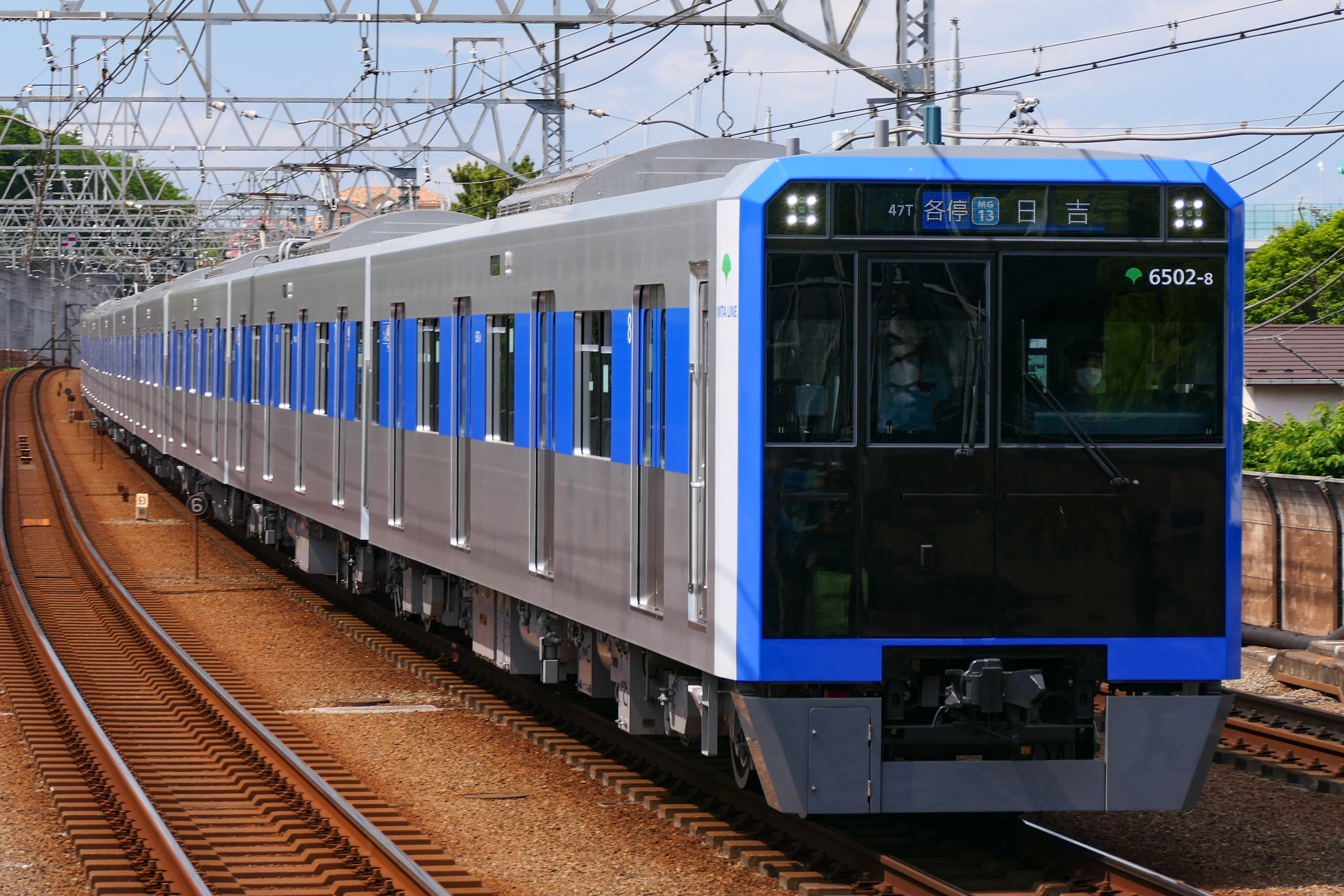
Toei 6500 series

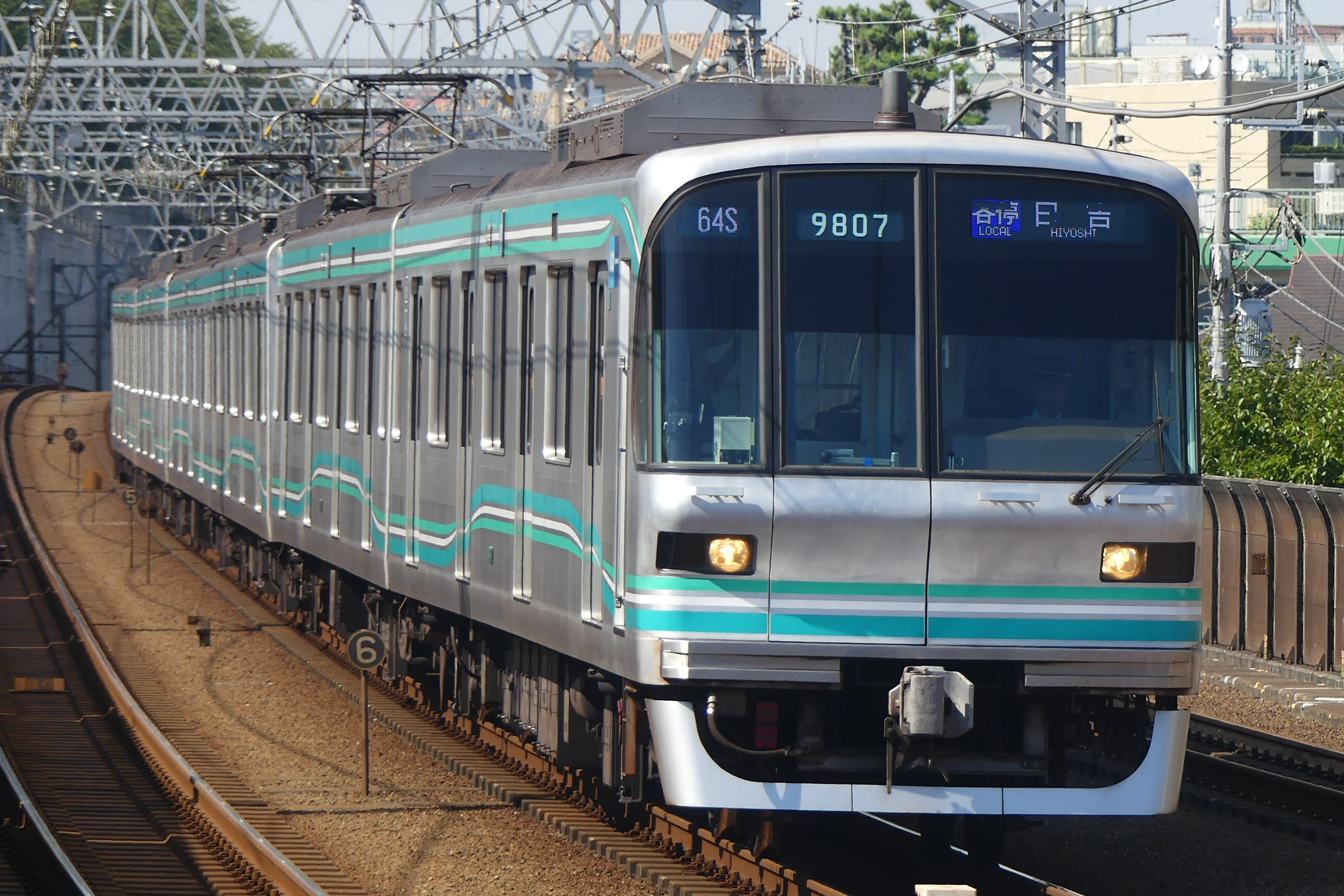
Tokyo Metro 9000 series

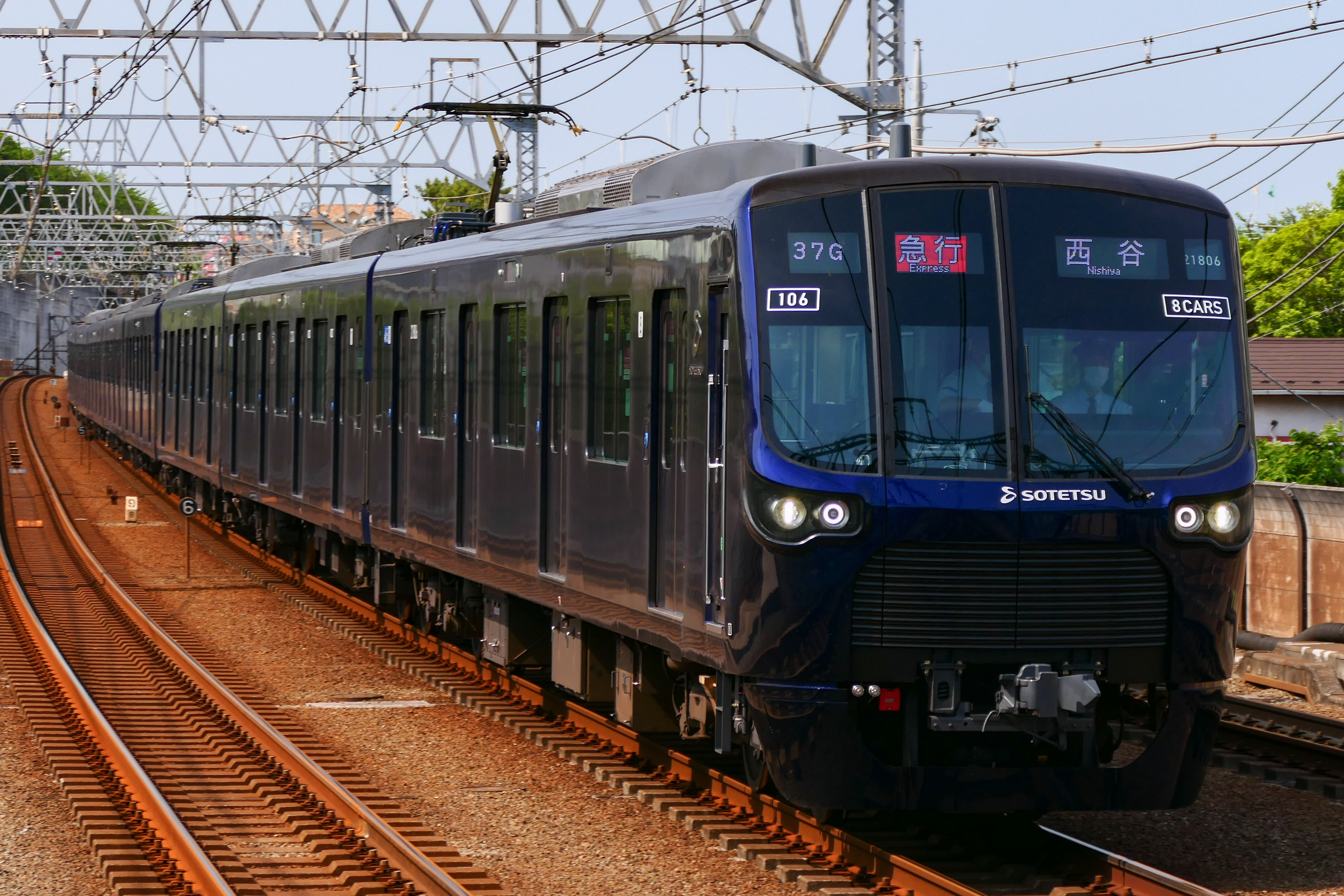
Sotetsu 21000 series

=== Former connecting lines ===
- Okusawa station - A 1 km (0.62 mi) 1,067 mm (3 ft 6 in) gauge line, electrified at 600 VDC, from Shin-Okusawa operated between 1928 and 1935, providing a connection to Yukigaya-Otsuka on the Tokyu Ikegami Line.

== See also ==
- List of railway lines in Japan
