= Meguro Station =

Railway and metro station in Tokyo, Japan

JY22 Meguro Station 目黒駅

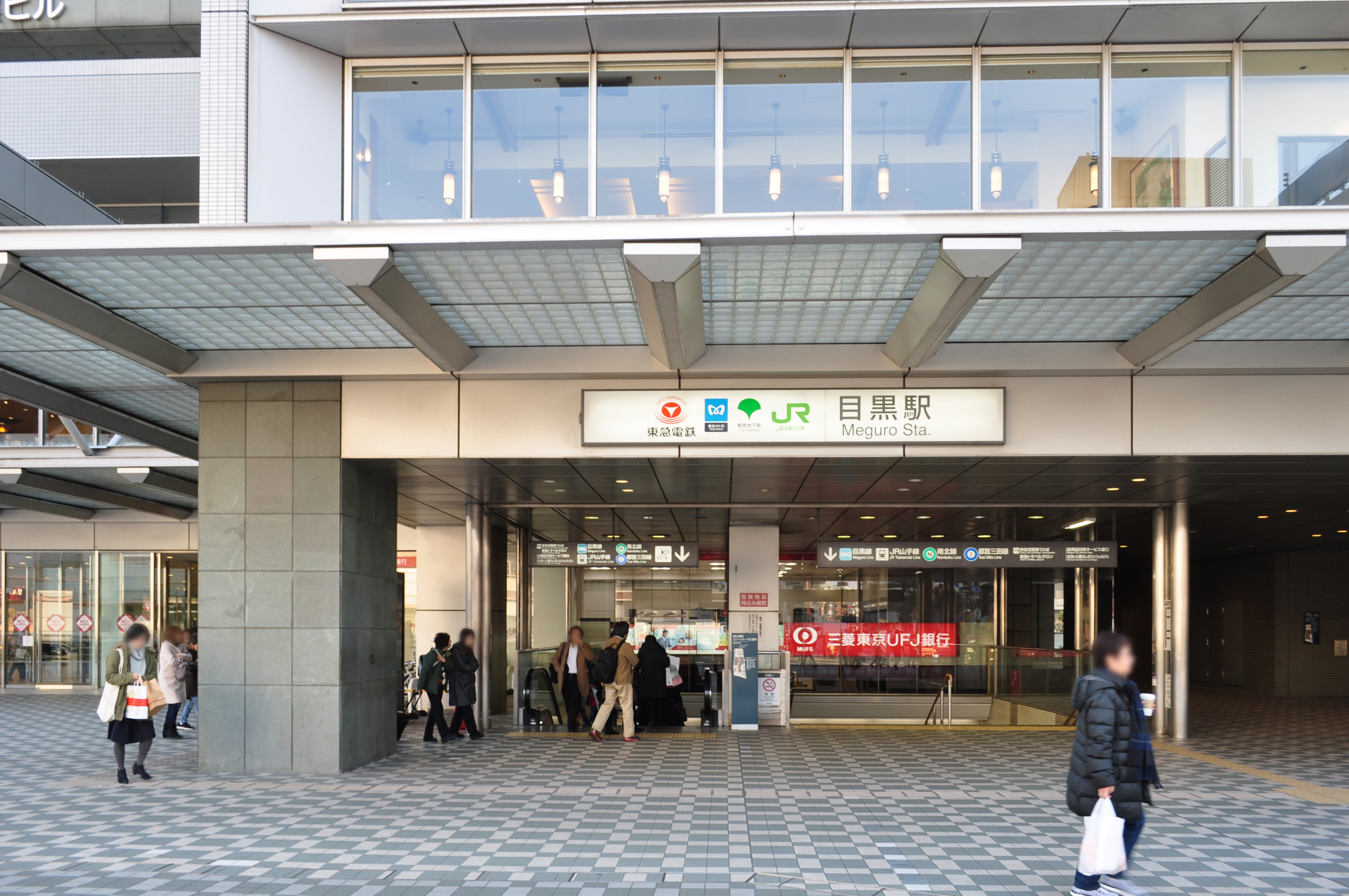
- The main entrance in January 2018

Japanese name
- Shinjitai: 目黒駅
- Kyūjitai: 目黑驛
- Hiragana: めぐろえき

General information
- Location: Kamiōsaki, Shinagawa, Tokyo; Japan
- Coordinates: 35°38′02″N 139°42′58″E
- Operator: Yamanote Line: JR East; Meguro, Mita and Namboku Lines: Tokyo Metro; Tōkyū Railways (manager); Toei Subway
- Lines: Yamanote Line; Meguro Line; Namboku Line; Mita Line
- Platforms: 2 island platforms
- Tracks: 4

Other information
- Station code: JY22; MG01; I-01; N-01

History
- Opened: 16 March 1885; 141 years ago

Passengers
- FY2024: 186,768 daily; 379,056 daily
Services
Preceding station	JR East	Following station
Gotanda JY23 Next counter-clockwise	Yamanote Line	Ebisu Next clockwise
Preceding station	Tōkyū Railways	Following station
Musashi-Koyama towards Hiyoshi	Meguro Line Express	through to Namboku Line or Mita Line
Fudōmae towards Hiyoshi	Meguro Line Local	through to Namboku Line or Mita Line
Preceding station	Tokyo Metro	Following station
through to Meguro Line	Namboku Line	Shirokanedai towards Akabane-iwabuchi
Preceding station	Toei Subway	Following station
through to Meguro	Mita Line	Shirokanedai towards Nishi-takashimadaira
Location
- Location within Tokyo Yamanote Loop Location within Tokyo wards area Location within Japan

Meguro Station (目黒駅, Meguro-eki) is a railway station in the Kamiōsaki district of Shinagawa, Tokyo, close to the boundary with Meguro ward.

== Lines ==
Meguro Station is served by the following lines:

- East Japan Railway Company (JR East) Yamanote Line
- Tokyo Metro Namboku Line - through service with Tokyu Meguro Line
- Toei Mita Line - through service with Tokyu Meguro Line
- Tokyu Meguro Line - through service with Tokyo Metro Namboku Line and Toei Mita Line

== Station layout ==
The JR East part of the station consists of one island platform serving two tracks. It also has a "Midori no Madoguchi" staffed ticket office and a View Plaza travel agency. The combined Tokyu, Tokyo Metro, and Toei part of the station consists of an island platform located on the 4th basement ("B4F") level.

=== JR East platforms ===
1	Yamanote Line	for Shinagawa and Tokyo
2	Yamanote Line	for Shibuya, Shinjuku, and Ikebukuro

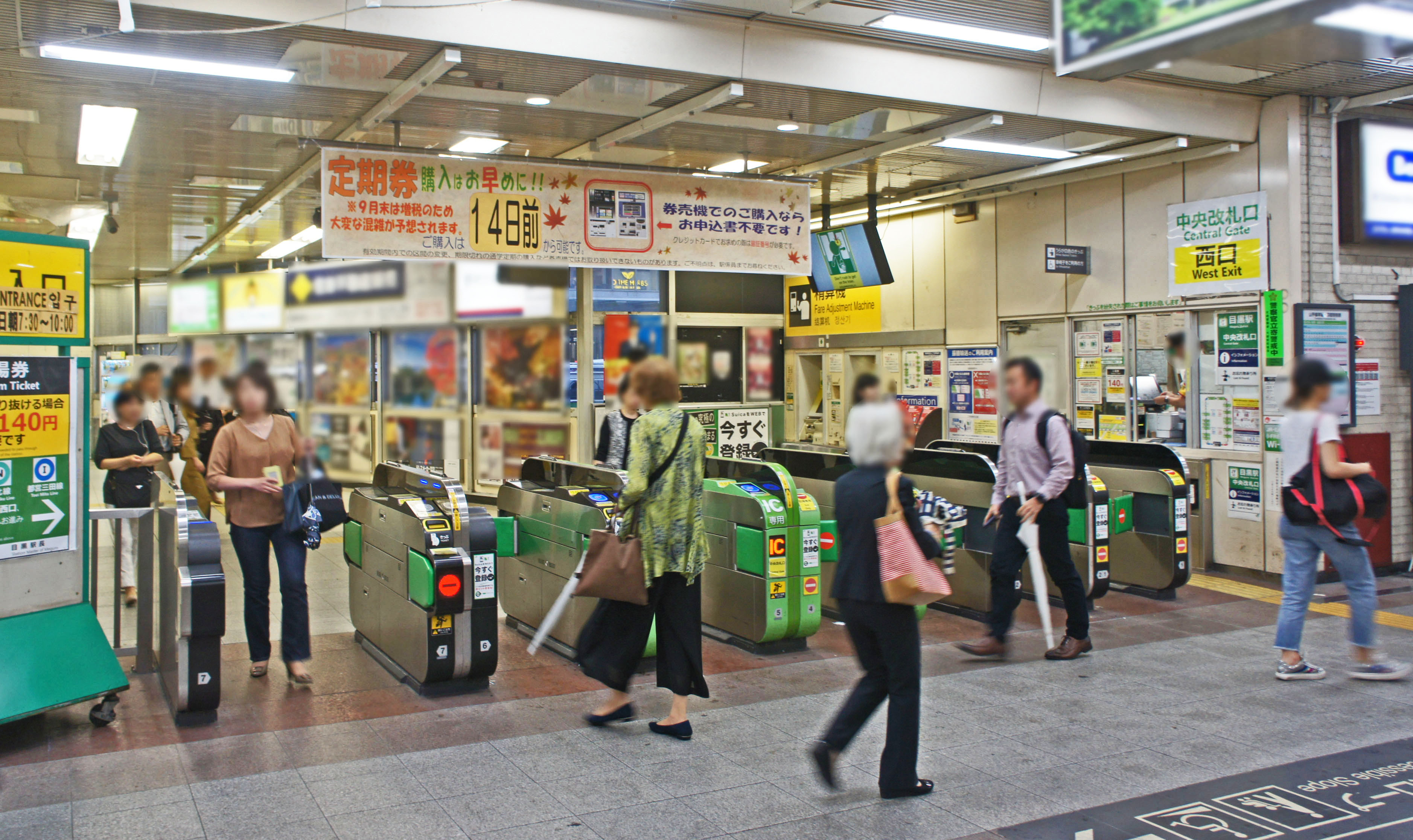
JR East ticket gates, 2019

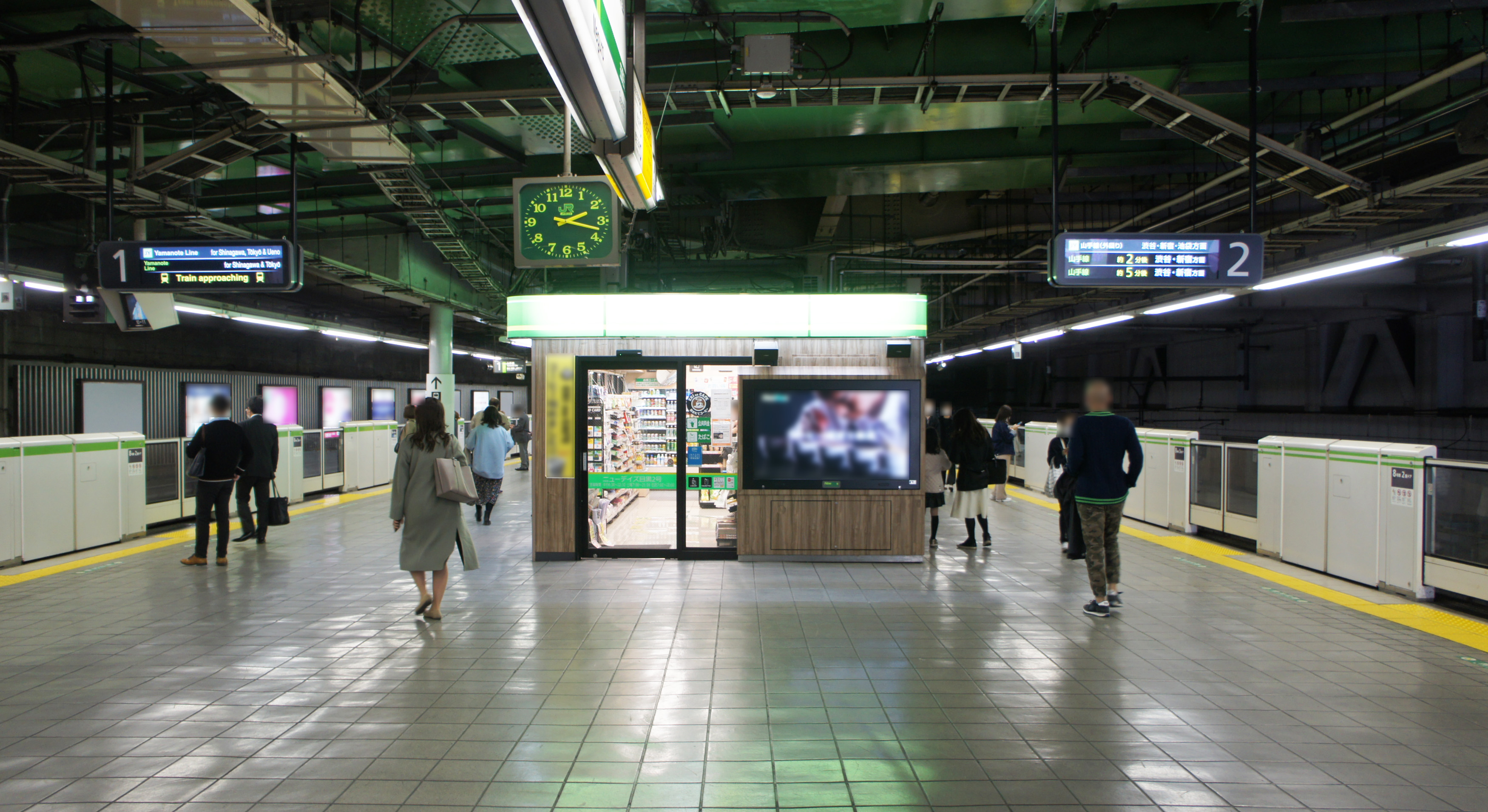
The Yamanote Line platforms in April 2021

=== Tokyu/Toei/Tokyo Metro platforms ===
1
Meguro Line
for Musashi-Kosugi, Hiyoshi, and Shin-Yokohama
- Sotetsu Main Line for Ebina via the Tokyu/Sotetsu Shin-Yokohama Line
- Sotetsu Izumino Line for Shōnandai via the Tokyu/Sotetsu Shin-Yokohama Line
2
Mita Line
for Otemachi, Suidobashi, Nishi-Takashimadaira
Namboku Line
for Iidabashi, Akabane-Iwabuchi
Saitama Rapid Railway Line for Urawa-Misono

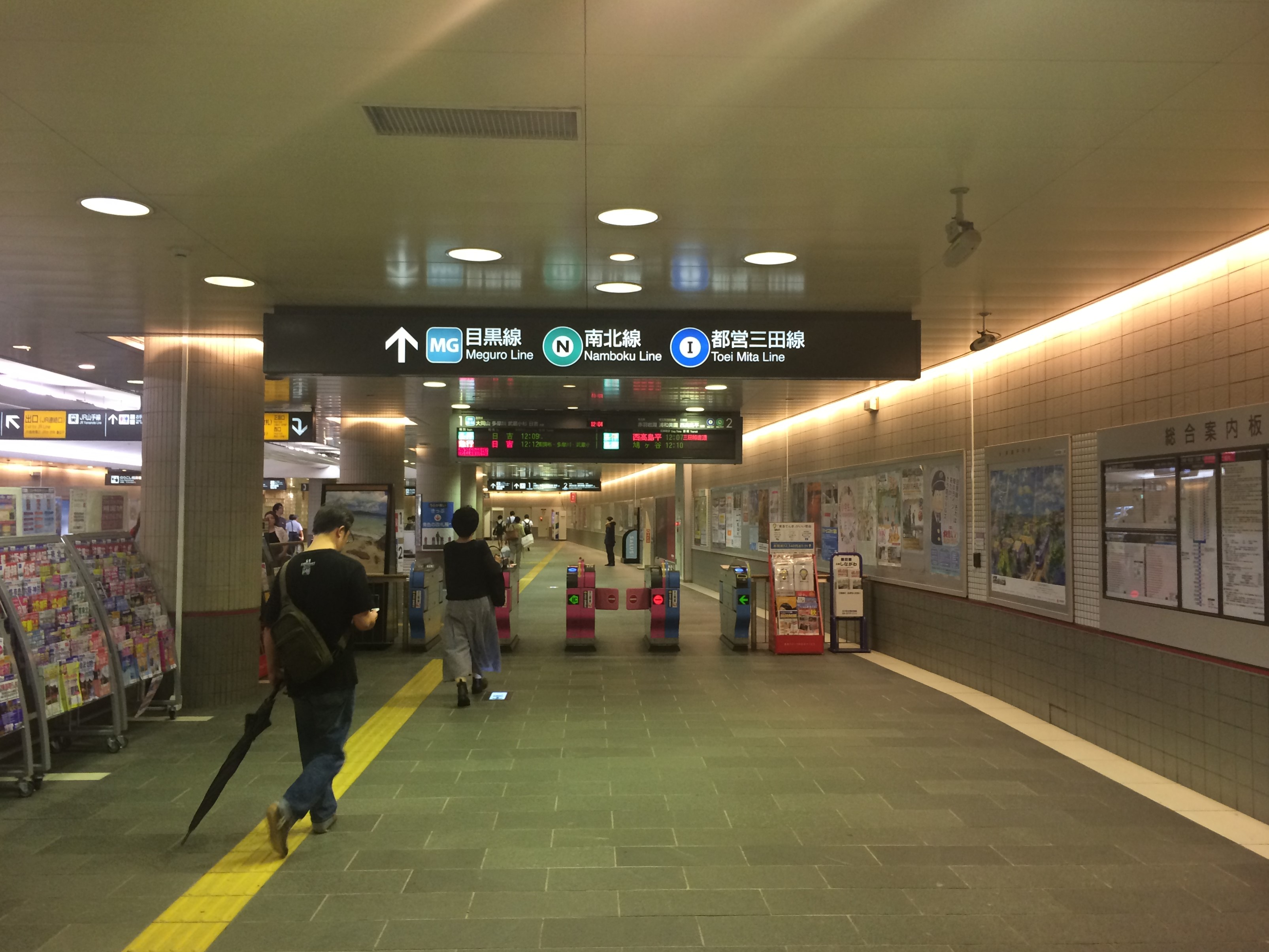
Tokyu/Tokyo Metro/Toei ticket gates, 2016

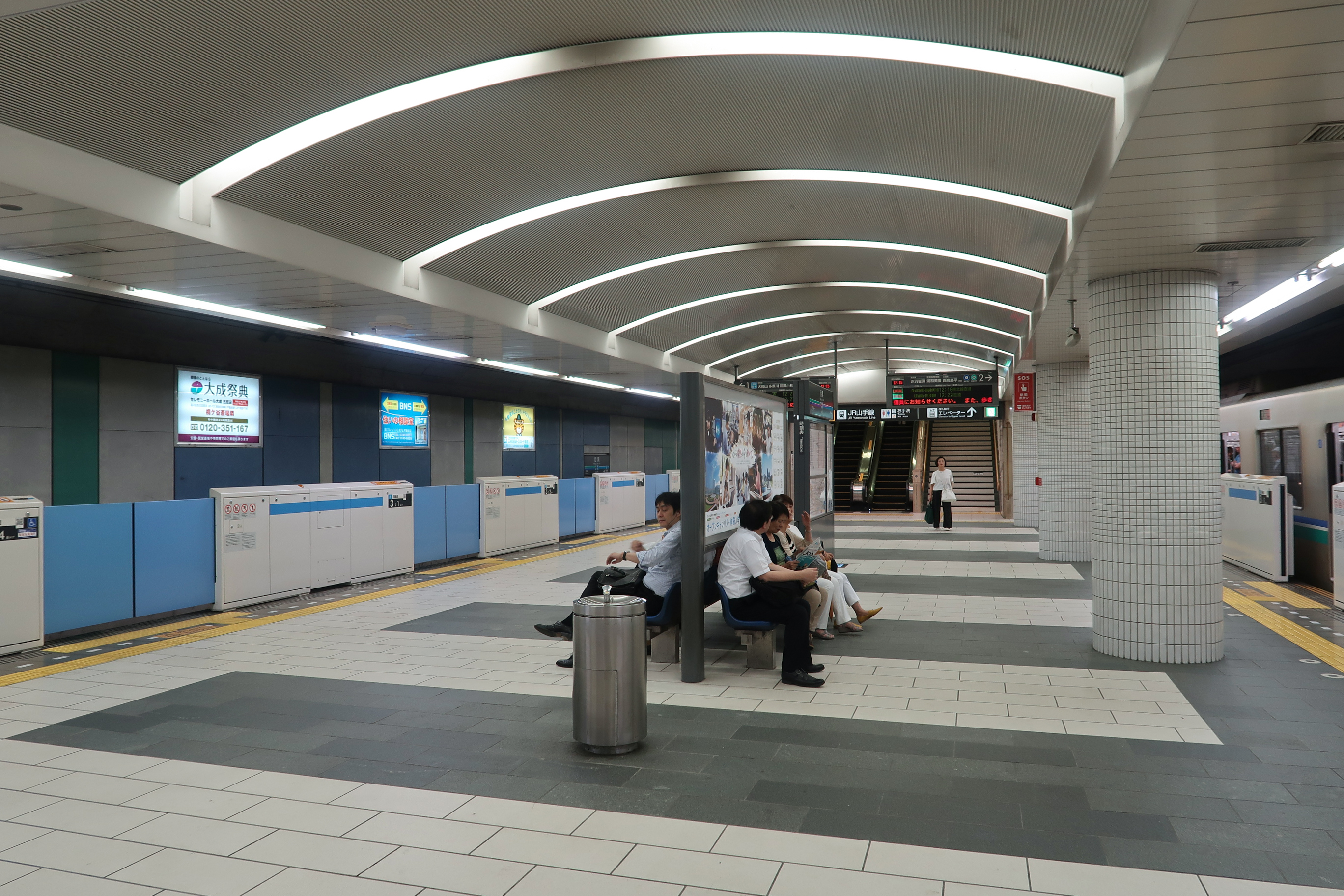
Tokyu/Tokyo Metro/Toei Platforms, 2018

== History ==
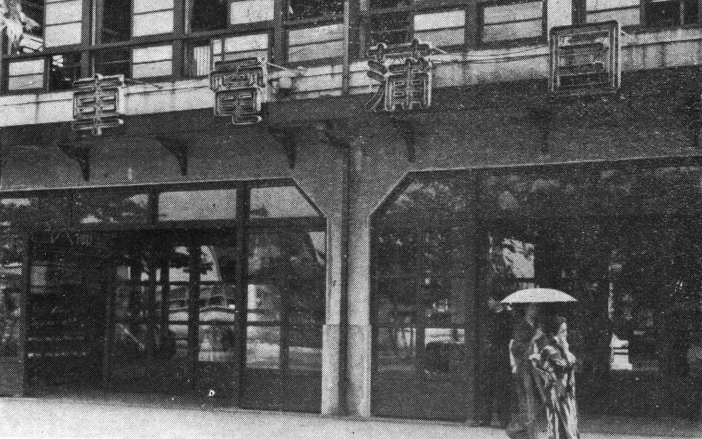
The station in the 1940s

The JR East station (originally Nippon Railway station) opened on 16 March 1885. The Tokyo Metro Namboku and Toei Mita Lines subway station opened on 26 September 2000.

The station facilities of the Namboku Line were inherited by Tokyo Metro after the privatization of the Teito Rapid Transit Authority (TRTA) in 2004.

Half-height platform edge doors were installed on the two Yamanote Line platforms from 28 August 2010.

Station numbering was introduced to the JR East platforms in 2016 with Meguro being assigned station number "JY22".

== Passenger statistics ==
In fiscal 2013, the JR East station was used by an average of 106,538 passengers daily (boarding passengers only), making it the 31st-busiest JR East station. Over the same fiscal year, the Tokyu station was used by an average of 248,074 passengers daily, making it the busiest station on the Meguro Line. In fiscal 2013, the Toei station was used by an average of 42,647 passengers daily (boarding passengers only). In fiscal 2013, the Tokyo Metro station was used by an average of 102,998 passengers daily. Note that the statistics consider passengers who travel through Meguro station on a through service as users of the station, even if they did not disembark at the station.

The daily passenger figures for JR East, Tokyu and Tokyo Metro in previous years are as shown below.

Fiscal year	JR East	Tokyu	Tokyo Metro
1999	110,348		
2000	106,820		
2005	98,344	195,425	
2010	102,310	235,597	
2011	101,998	236,572	94,530
2012	103,033	241,718	98,495
2013	106,538	248,074	102,998

- Note that JR East figures are for boarding passengers only.

== See also ==
- List of railway stations in Japan
