= Kōhoku New Town =

Community in Yokohama, Japan

Coordinates: 35°33′15″N 139°34′40″E

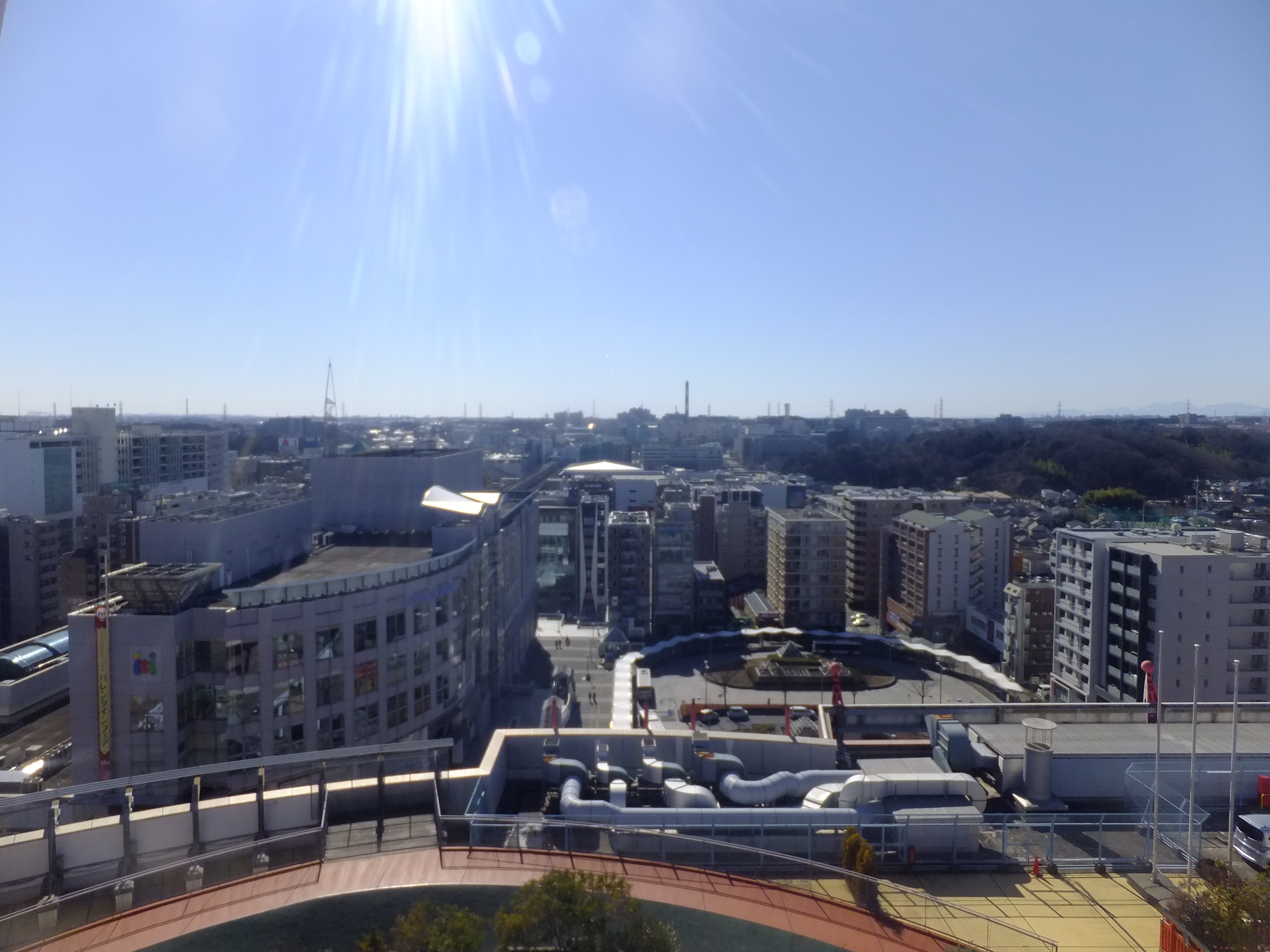
Center area of Kōhoku New Town (2015)

Kōhoku New Town (港北ニュータウン, Kōhoku Nyūtaun) is a large residential development, located in Tsuzuki-ku, Yokohama in Kanagawa, Japan, it located in the Tama Hills about 12 kilometers (7.5 mi) north-north-west of the central of Yokohama City and 25 kilometers (16 mi) south-west of the center of the special wards of Tokyo.

== Overview ==
Kōhoku New Town was planned as one of Japan's largest-scale residential development (new town) projects.

During the Japanese economic miracle in the 1960s, Yokohama experienced a sharp population increase as a commuter town for Tokyo. However, concerns arose that this population growth would lead to uncontrolled development (Urban sprawl), and deteriorating living environments. This resulted in serious social problems such as worsening water resources, insufficient main roads, and a lack of public facilities like schools. At the time, there were no laws to regulate this.

In February 1965, then-Yokohama Mayor Ichio Asukata announced the “Yokohama Six Major Projects,” which included developing a subway and expressway network, redeveloping the city center (Minato Mirai 21), and undertaking large-scale improvements to industrial and residential areas. Based on this plan, Kōhoku New Town was established as a project to develop the Tama Hills in northeastern Yokohama as a residential area. Land acquisition and land readjustment began in 1969. The first residents moved into the southern district in 1984 and the northern district in 1990. Land readjustment was completed in 1996, but development has continued since then.

The plan was based on four basic principles: preventing uncontrolled urban development (urban sprawl), establishing urban agriculture, community participation in urban development, and multi-functional, complex urban development.

The development covered approximately 2,530 hectares of the Tama Hills within Tsuzuki-ku, with land readjustment projects implemented on about 1,341 hectares. The New Town area is designated as a district plan zone and a town development consultation district. Yokohama City requires consultation with local residents during development to foster a favorable living environment. At the start of New Town development, Kōhoku New Town belonged to Kōhoku-ku and Midori-ku. Due to population growth, the area centered on Kōhoku New Town was newly divided into Tsuzuki-ku in 1994.

The parts of Kōhoku New Town are broadly divided into three main areas: the First District in the north centered around Center-Kita Station, the Second District in the south centered around Center-Minami Station, and the Central District located between them. The Town Center District is located adjacent to the Central District. Additionally, there are six designated Agricultural Districts (totaling 230.0 hectares) where development is restricted to support urban agriculture, and land is also reserved for attracting businesses.

As of 2010, approximately 75,000 households and 199,000 residents lived in Kōhoku New Town.

== Features of Kōhoku New Town ==
=== The policies of urban development ===
Kōhoku New Town promoted urban development based on the following four principles.

Urban development evoking the phrase "hometown"

In Japan, the natural mountains known as Satoyama and the murmuring of the streams flowing between them are known as "primitive landscapes," evoking images of rural hometowns. The new town's urban development aimed to evoke these landscapes.

Urban development that maximizes greenery

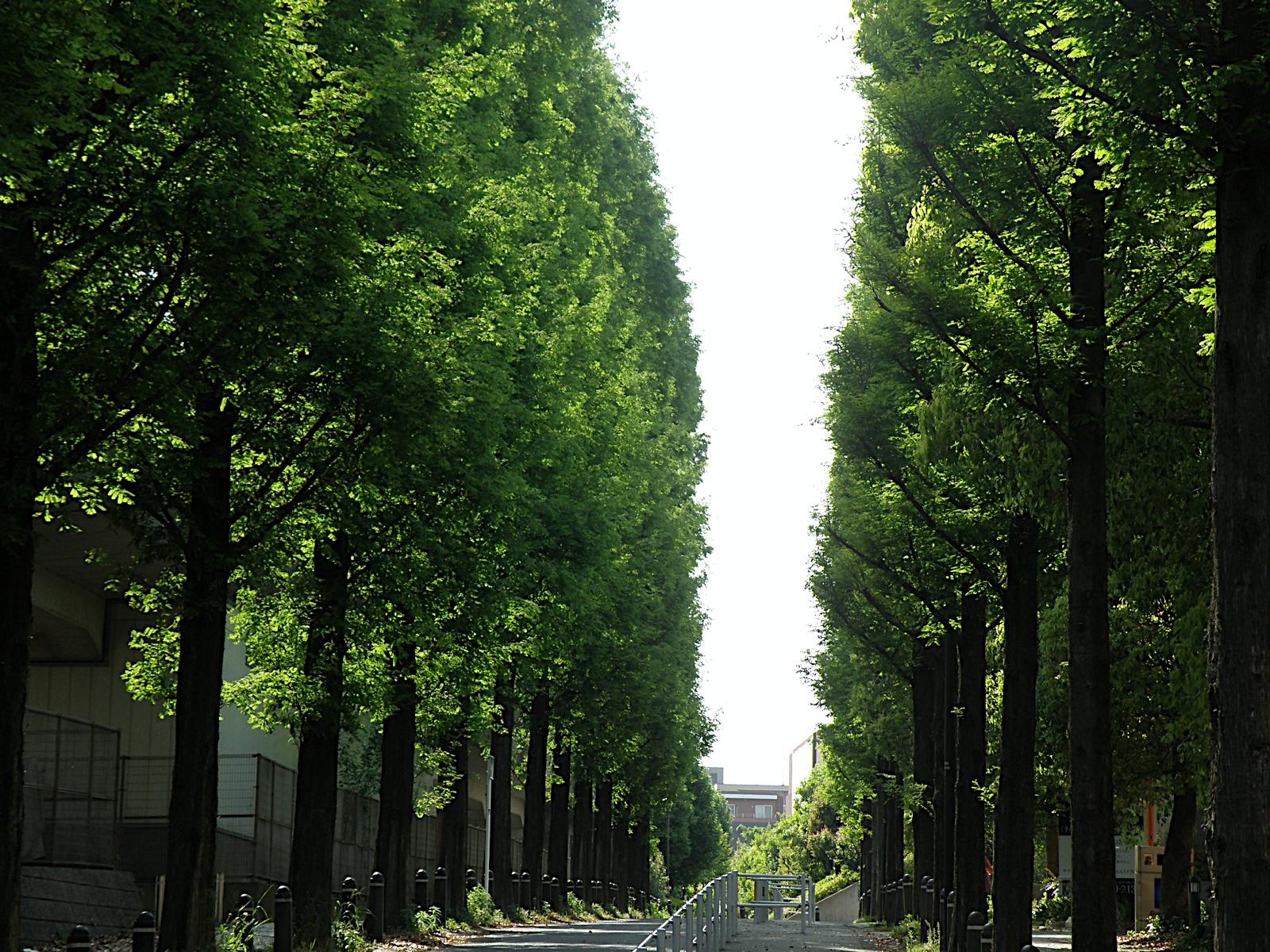
Nakamachidai-Green Road within Newtown area

The goal was to preserve the original land features, such as mountains, slopes, and valleys, as continuously as possible, rather than having them broken up into fragments. This is intended to create a city that retains a diverse natural environment suited to the unique features of the terrain.

Kōhoku New Town adopted a green space preservation system known as the "Green Matrix." This system preserved green spaces that existed in the area before development and secured them as public parks. Greenways and pedestrian paths were built connecting these spaces, striving to preserve as much of the natural environment as possible even after development. This approach preserved the green landscape even after development and created a city with easy access to nature. Landowners along the greenways were also encouraged to preserve green spaces on their own properties, contributing to the expansion of green spaces. The Green Matrix is described as a "green arterial” system.

Safe urban development

In addition to a green network consisting of parks and greenways on continuous mountains, slopes, and valleys, functionally linked pedestrian-only roads were also established, connecting major train stations and bus stops. This clearly separated transport and pedestrian areas, aiming to create a safe and enjoyable city.

This separation allowed streets and highways in Newtown to implement pedestrian-vehicle separation, segregating pedestrian and vehicular traffic. Furthermore, residential areas are designed to prevent through traffic from entering their narrow streets. For the convenience of residents, pedestrian- and bicycle-only roads were constructed to safely and comfortably connect residences to stations, bus stops, centers, schools, and other locations.

In addition to arterial roads for automobiles, pedestrian paths and "Green Matrix" greenways run throughout the Newtown, serving a variety of purposes.

Urban development that offers high-quality services

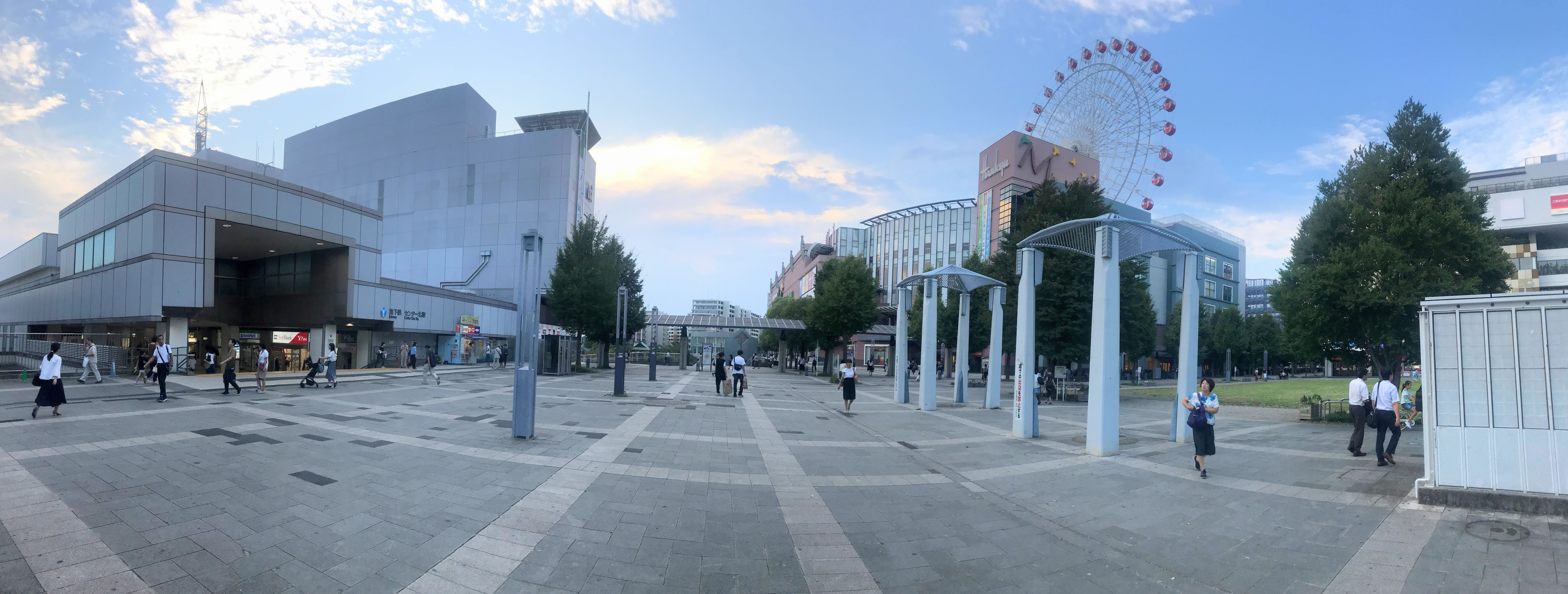
Around area of Center-Kita Station, a core commercial area in the newtown

The subway construction project was incorporated into the development of Kōhoku New Town, giving public transportation access in all directions. The Town Center District, a centralized lifestyle hub centered around Center-Kita and Center-Minami Stations station was strategically established as the new town's service hub.

The Town Center District around Center Minami Station and Center Kita Station functions as a sub-central business district for Yokohama City, hosting numerous shopping centers. These commercial areas not only support the lives of new town residents, but also attract customers from outside the new town providing one of the most attractive commercial areas in the Tokyo metropolitan area.

=== Urban agriculture ===
The site where Kōhoku New Town was built was once a rural area covered in farmland and forests. To enable coexistence between the new town and agriculture, an agricultural zone was established along its outer perimeter. During the new town's construction, land swaps and divisions were carried out between the farmland owned by farmers wishing to continue farming in this area and the land in the agricultural zone, thereby preserving agriculture. Furthermore, the securing of green spaces and open areas ensures a supply of fresh vegetables and fruits, while also functioning as emergency evacuation sites within the new town.

=== Dialogue with residents for development of Kōhoku New Town ===
During the new town development, joint discussion meetings with residents were held to formulate the development plan. This resulted in promoting public understanding of the plan and securing cooperation during the implementation phase.

Moreover, the Newtown plan allowed landowners who lost land due to development to receive compensation in the form of land in a location of their choice, rather than land close to their original property. This innovative approach also facilitated securing the cooperation of landowners.

These initiatives were groundbreaking in Japan at the time, enabling residents to play a crucial role in urban development.

== Transportation ==
=== Subway and buses ===
Two subway lines run within the area. Route buses survices is also provided by Yokohama Municipal Bus and Tokyu Bus.

Yokohama Municipal Subway Blue Line (Line No.3) runs between Nakamachidai Station - Center Minami Station - Center Kita Station - Nakagawa Station. It was opened on March 18, 1993, and was the first railroad in the newtown.

Yokohama Municipal Subway Green Line (Line No.4) runs between Kita-Yamata Station - Center Kita Station - Center Minami Station - Tsuzuki-fureainooka Station. It opened on March 30, 2008.

=== Highways ===
The Tsuzuki Interchange of the Daisan Keihin Road is located within the Newtown area. The Tōmei Expressway, Shuto Expressway Yokohama Northwest Route and Japan National Route 246 also run through the area. The Yokohama-Aoba Interchange of these roads is the nearest interchange to Newtown.

== See also ==
- Tama New Town
