= Hiyoshi-Honchō Station =

Metro station in Yokohama, Japan

Coordinates: 35.5496°N 139.6335°E

G09 Hiyoshi-Honchō Station 日吉本町駅
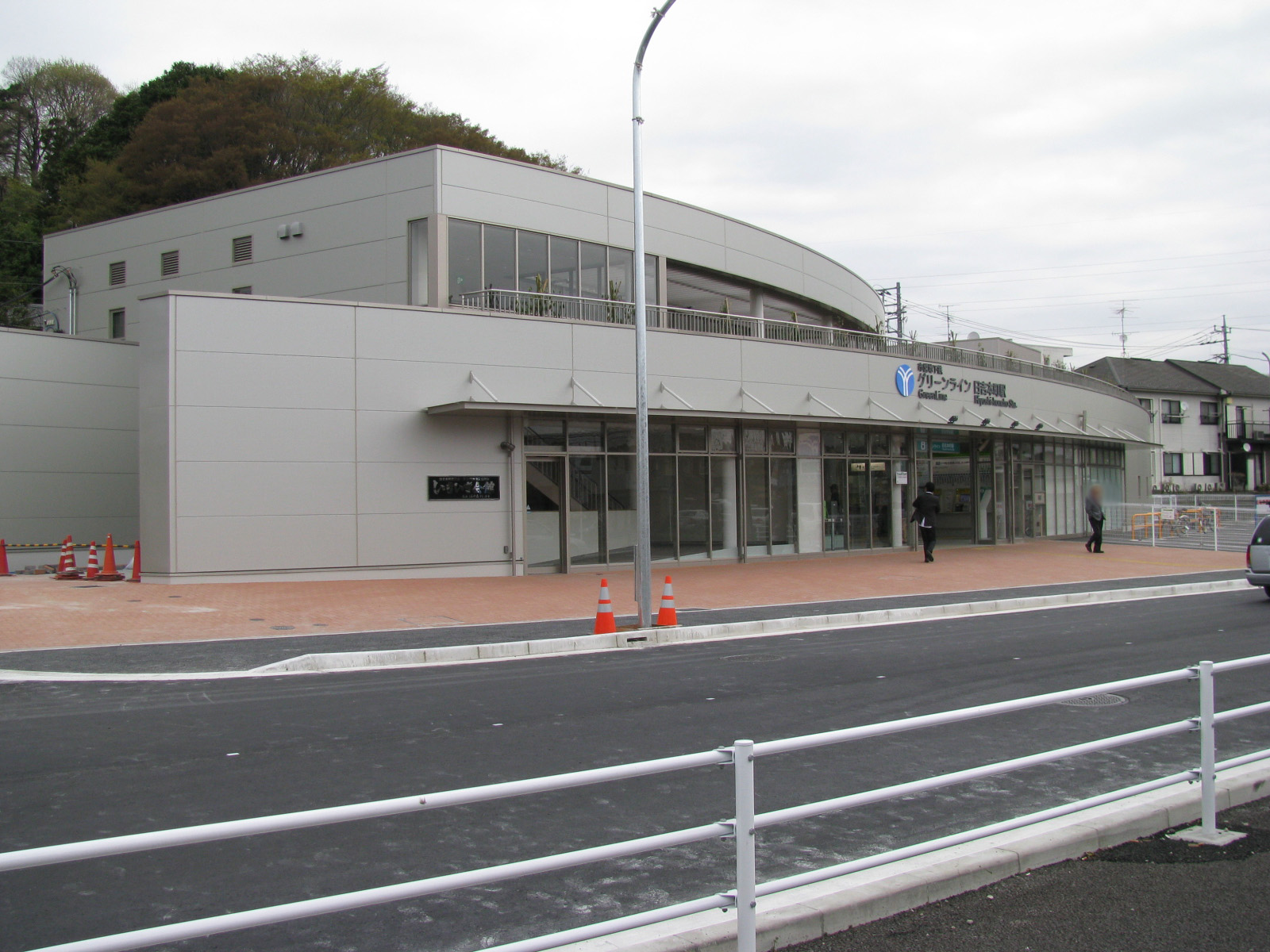

General information
- Location: Hiyoshi-Honchō 5-3-1, Kōhoku, Yokohama, Kanagawa （横浜市都港北区日吉本町五丁目3-1） Japan
- System: Yokohama Municipal Subway station
- Operator: Yokohama City Transportation Bureau
- Line: Green Line
- Platforms: 1 island platform
- Tracks: 2
- Connections: Bus stop

Construction
- Structure type: Underground

Other information
- Station code: G09

History
- Opened: March 30, 2008; 18 years ago

Passengers
- 2008: 4,610 daily

Services
Preceding station	Yokohama Municipal Subway	Following station
Takata G08 towards Nakayama	Green Line	Hiyoshi G10 Terminus
Location
- Location within Yokohama Location within Kanagawa Prefecture Location within Japan

Hiyoshi-Honchō Station (日吉本町駅, Hiyoshi-Honchō-eki) is a metro station located in Kōhoku Ward, Yokohama, Kanagawa Prefecture, Japan. It is served by the Yokohama Municipal Subway’s Green Line (Line 4) and is 11.6 kilometers from the terminus of the Green Line at Nakayama.

== Lines ==
- Yokohama Municipal Subway
  - Green Line

== Station layout ==
Hiyoshi-Honchō Station has a single underground island platform serving two tracks.

=== Platforms ===
1	■ Green Line	Center-Minami ・Nakayama
2	■ Green Line	Hiyoshi

== History ==
Hiyoshi-Honchō Station opened on 30 March 2008 when the Green Line began operation.
