= Takata Station (Kanagawa) =

Metro station in Yokohama, Japan

Coordinates: 35°32′58.65″N 139°37′12.49″E

G08 Takata Station 高田駅
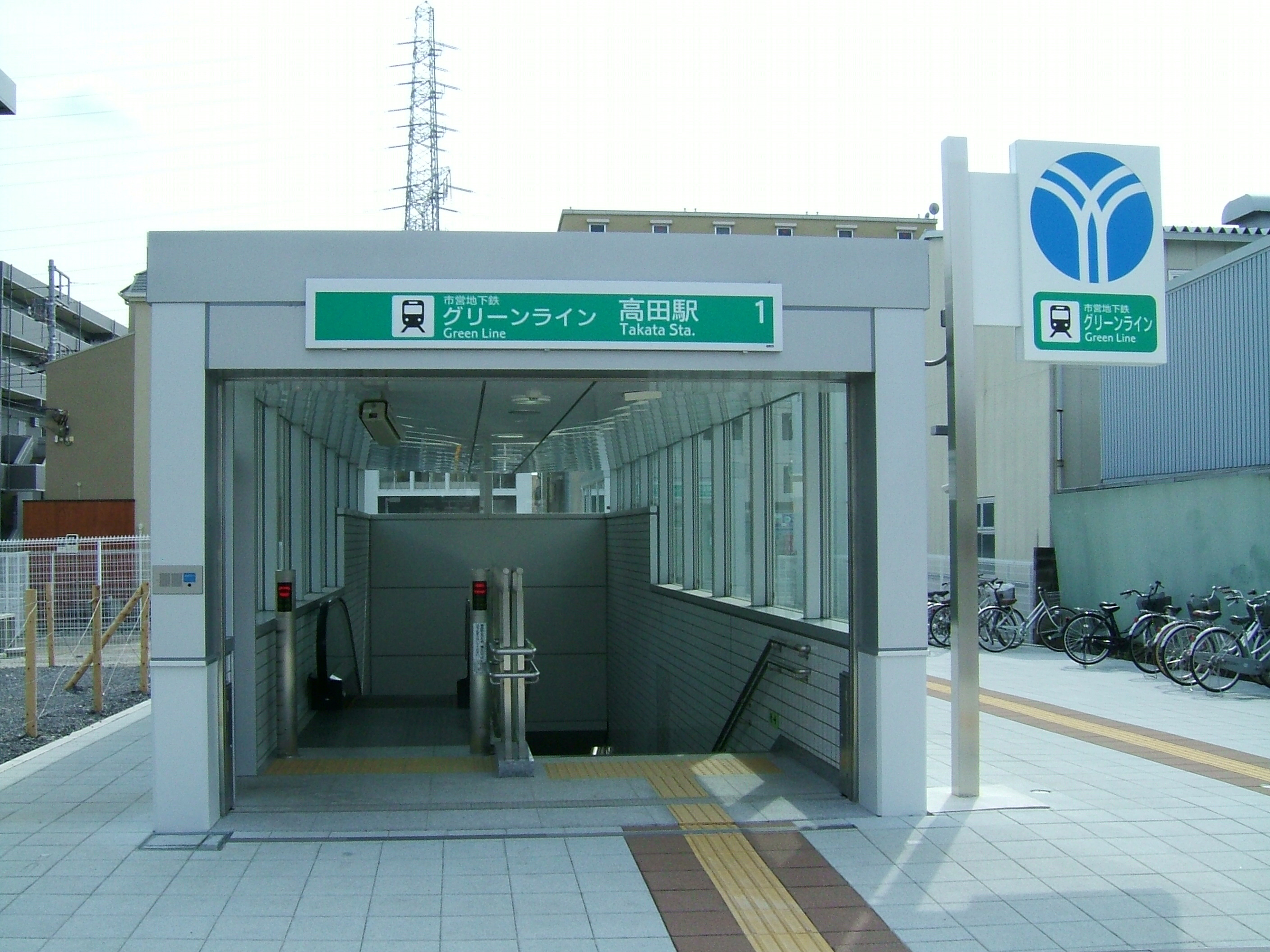

General information
- Location: Takata-Higashi 3-1-3, Kōhoku, Yokohama, Kanagawa （横浜市港北区高田東三丁目1-3） Japan
- System: Yokohama Municipal Subway station
- Operator: Yokohama City Transportation Bureau
- Line: Green Line
- Platforms: 2 side platforms (split platform)
- Tracks: 2

Construction
- Structure type: Underground

Other information
- Station code: G08

History
- Opened: 30 March 2008; 18 years ago

Passengers
- 2008: 4,125 daily

Services
Preceding station	Yokohama Municipal Subway	Following station
Higashi-Yamata G07 towards Nakayama	Green Line	Hiyoshi-Honchō G09 towards Hiyoshi
Location
- Location within Yokohama Location within Kanagawa Prefecture Location within Japan

Takata Station (高田駅, Takata-eki) is a metro station located in Kōhoku Ward, Yokohama, Kanagawa Prefecture, Japan. It is served by the Yokohama Municipal Subway’s Green Line (Line 4) and is 10.3 kilometers from the terminus of the Green Line at Nakayama.

== Lines ==
- Yokohama Municipal Subway
  - Green Line

== Station layout ==
Takata Station has two single underground split platforms. Platform 1 is located on the third story underground, and serves traffic in the direction of Hiyoshi. Platform 2 is located one level below, four stories underground, and serves traffic in the direction of Nakayama.

=== Platforms ===
1	■ Green Line	Center-Minami ・Nakayama
2	■ Green Line	Hiyoshi

== History ==
Takata Station opened on 30 March 2008 when the Green Line began operation.
