= Higashi-Yamata Station =

Metro station in Yokohama, Japan

Coordinates: 35.5541°N 139.6044°E

G07 Higashi-Yamata Station 東山田駅
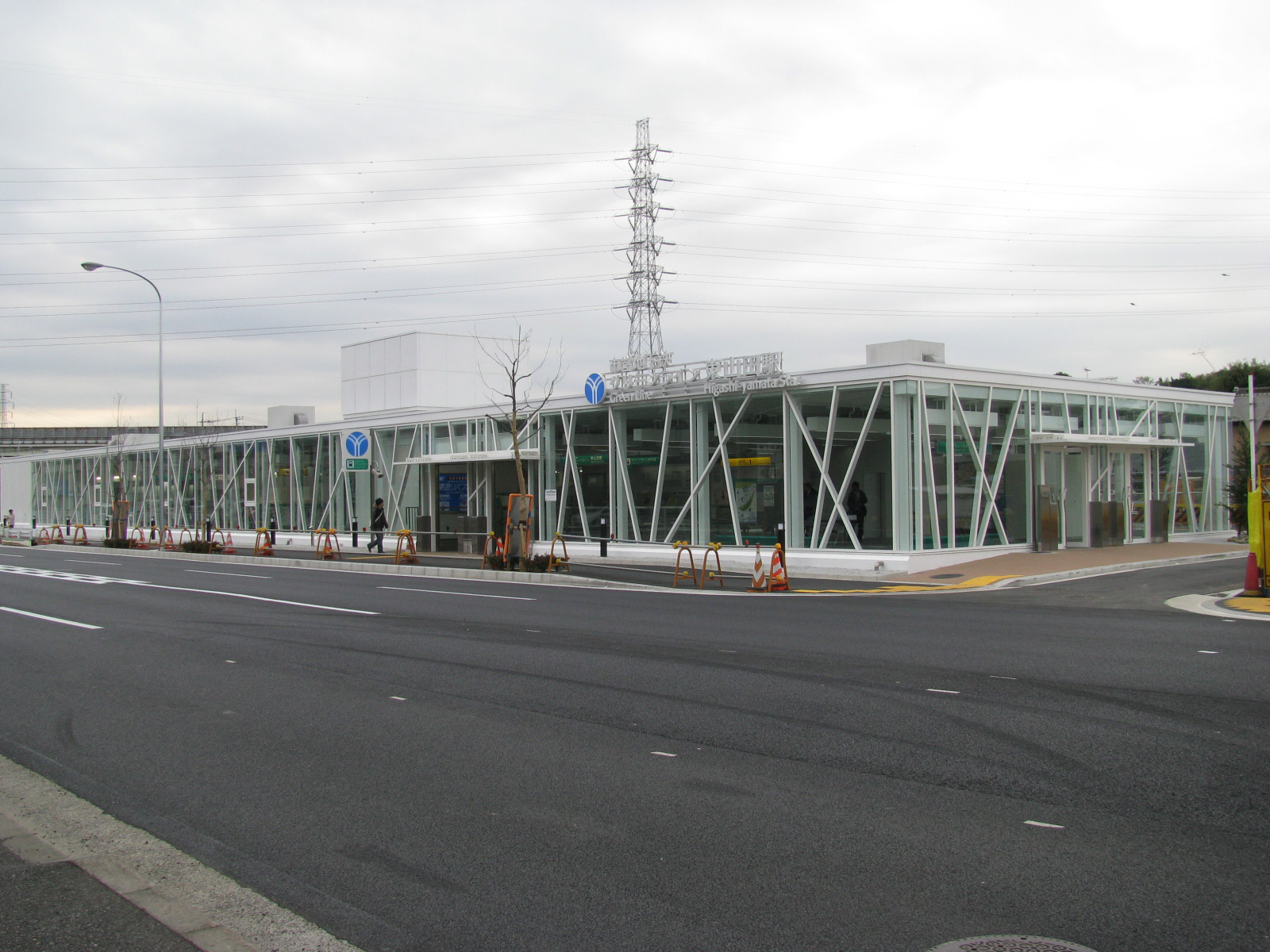

General information
- Location: 300 Higashiyamatachō, Tsuzuki, Yokohama, Kanagawa （横浜市都筑区東山田町300） Japan
- System: Yokohama Municipal Subway station
- Operator: Yokohama City Transportation Bureau
- Line: Green Line
- Platforms: 1 island platform
- Tracks: 2
- Connections: Bus stop

Construction
- Structure type: Underground

Other information
- Station code: G07

History
- Opened: 30 March 2008; 18 years ago

Passengers
- 2008: 2,727 daily

Services
Preceding station	Yokohama Municipal Subway	Following station
Kita-Yamata G06 towards Nakayama	Green Line	Takata G08 towards Hiyoshi
Location
- Location within Yokohama Location within Kanagawa Prefecture Location within Japan

Higashi-Yamata Station (東山田駅, Higashi-Yamata-eki) is metro station located in Tsuzuki Ward, Yokohama, Kanagawa, Japan. It is served by the Yokohama Municipal Subway’s Green Line (Line 4) and is 8.8 kilometers from the terminus of the Green Line at Nakayama.

== Lines ==
- Yokohama Municipal Subway
  - Green Line

== Station layout ==
Higashi-Yamata Station has a single underground island platform serving two tracks.

=== Platforms ===
1	■ Green Line	Center-Minami ・Nakayama
2	■ Green Line	Hiyoshi

== History ==
Higashi-Yamata Station opened on 30 March 2008 when the Green Line started operation.
