= Yokohama Municipal Subway 10000 series =

Japanese train type

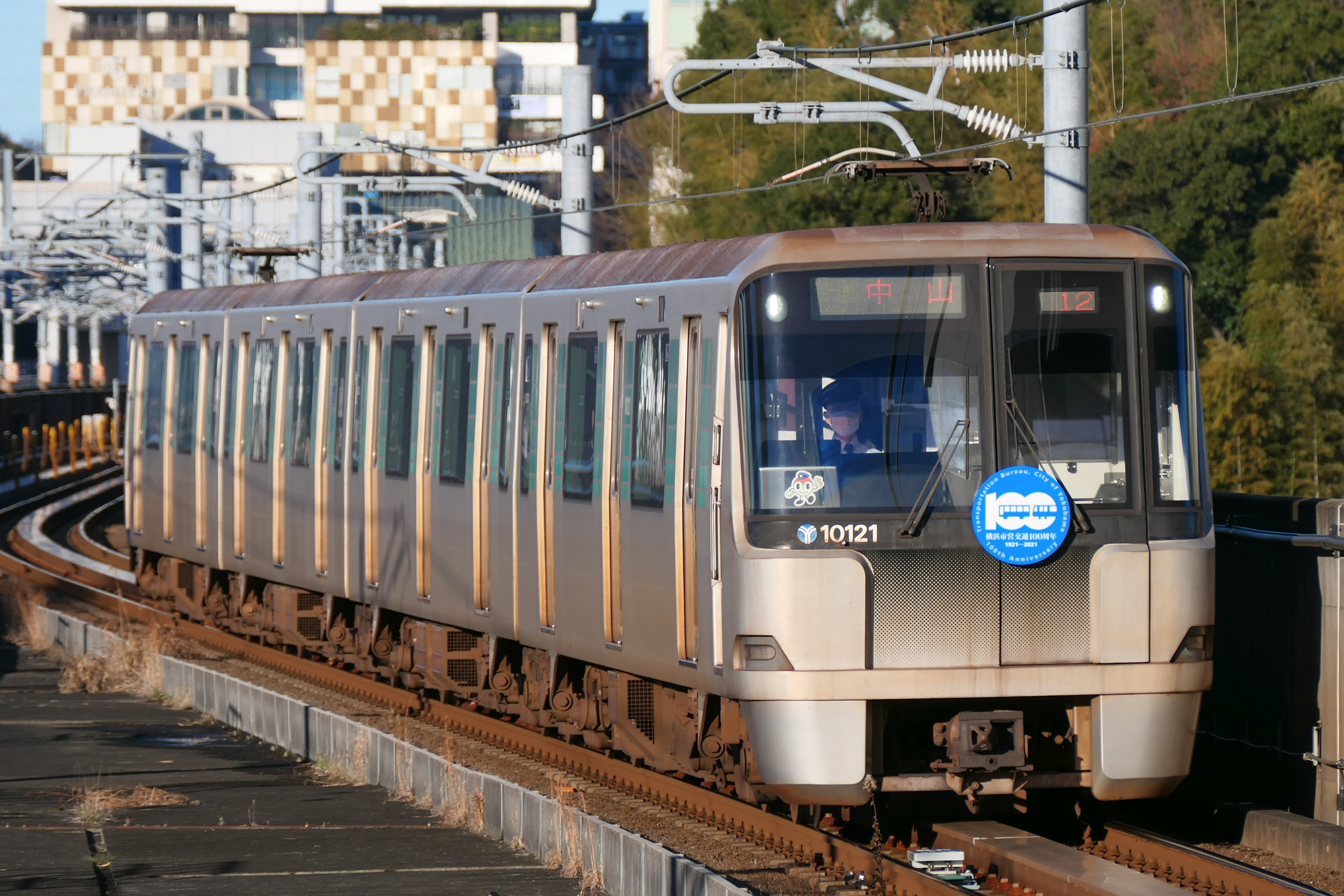
- Set 10121 in December 2021

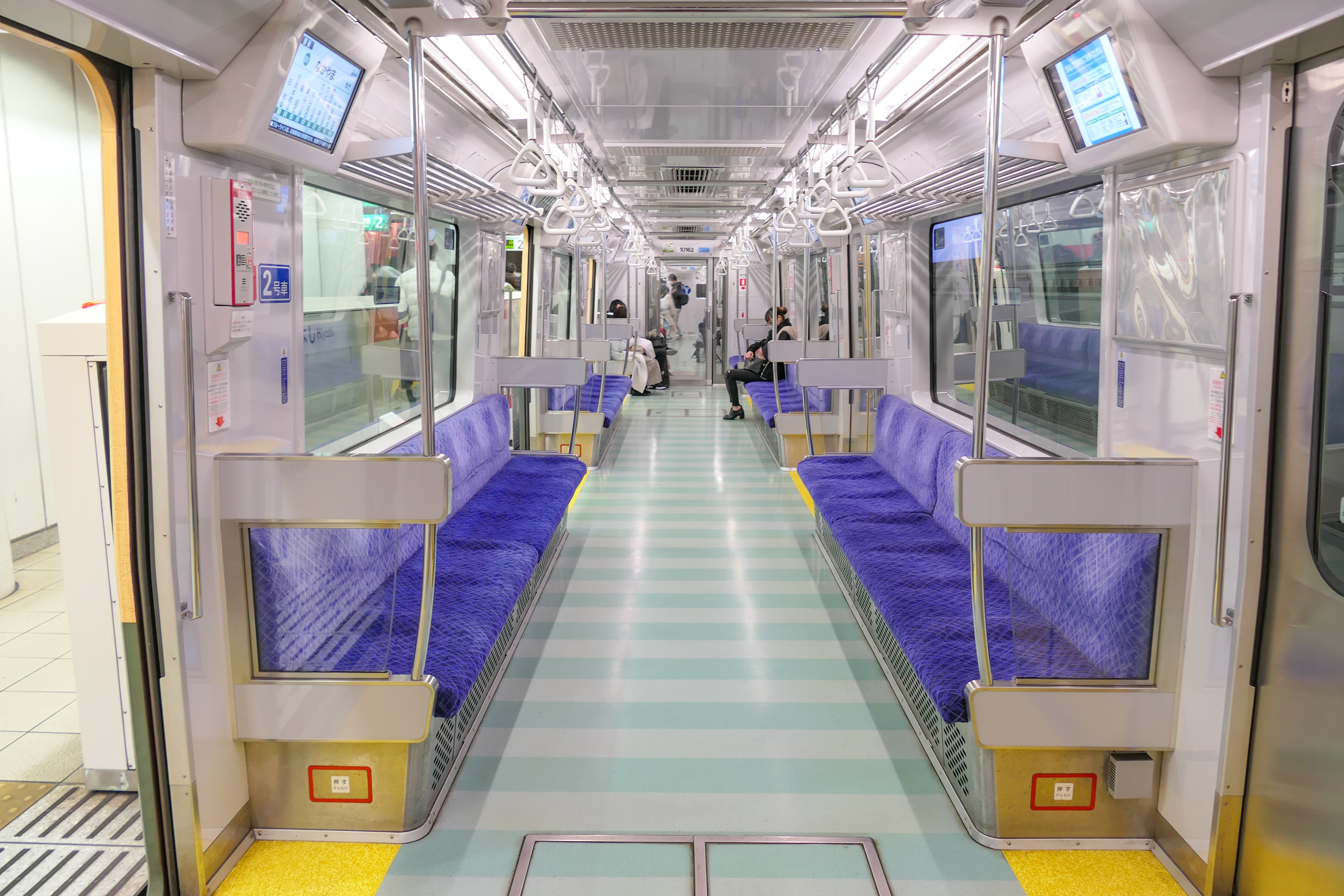
- Interior (December 2021)
- Manufacturer: Kawasaki Heavy Industries
- Built at: Kōbe, Hyōgo
- Constructed: 2007–
- Entered service: March 2008
- Number under construction: 18 vehicles
- Number built: 70 vehicles (17 sets) as of September 2022
- Number in service: 70 vehicles (17 sets)
- Formation: 4/6 cars per trainset
- Fleet numbers: 10011–10171
- Capacity: 380 (136 seated) per 4-car set
- Operators: Yokohama Municipal Subway
- Depots: Kawawa
- Lines served: Green Line

Specifications
- Car body construction: Aluminium
- Train length: 63.2 m (207 ft 4 in)
- Car length: 15,600 mm (51 ft 2 in) (end cars); 15,000 mm (49 ft 3 in) (intermediate cars)
- Width: 2,490 mm (8 ft 2 in)
- Height: 3,105 mm (10 ft 2.2 in)
- Doors: 3 pairs per side
- Wheel diameter: 660 mm (26 in)
- Maximum speed: 80 km/h (50 mph)
- Weight: 105 t (103 long tons; 116 short tons)
- Traction system: Mitsubishi Electric MAP-144-15V154 IGBT–VVVF
- Traction motors: Mitsubishi MB-7010-A 3-phase AC linear induction motor
- Acceleration: 3.2 km/(h⋅s) (2.0 mph/s)
- Deceleration: 3.5 km/(h⋅s) (2.2 mph/s) (service); 4.0 km/(h⋅s) (2.5 mph/s) (emergency)
- Electric system(s): 1,500 V DC (overhead catenary)
- Current collection: Pantograph
- Safety system(s): HD-ATC/ATO
- Track gauge: 1,435 mm (4 ft 8 1/2 in) standard gauge

The Yokohama Municipal Subway 10000 series (横浜市交通局10000形) is a linear motor-powered electric multiple unit (EMU) operated by the Yokohama Municipal Subway on the Green Line since March 2008.

== Formation ==
As of 1 April 2017, the fleet consists of 17 four-car sets with all cars motored, and formed as shown below with car 1 at the Nakayama end. The sets are designed to allow the insertion of two centre cars at a later date, hence the numbering sequence that omits cars 3 and 4.

Car No.	1	2	3	4
Designation	Mc1	M2	M5	Mc6
Numbering	10xx1	10xx2	10xx5	10xx6
Weight (t)	26.5	26.0	26.0	26.5
Capacity (total/seated)	88/31	102/37	102/37	88/31

- "xx" indicates the individual set number.
- Cars 1 and 4 are each fitted with one single-arm pantograph.
- Car 3 is designated as a mildly air-conditioned car.

== Interior ==
Passenger accommodation consists of longitudinal bench seating throughout. Wheelchair spaces are provided in each car.

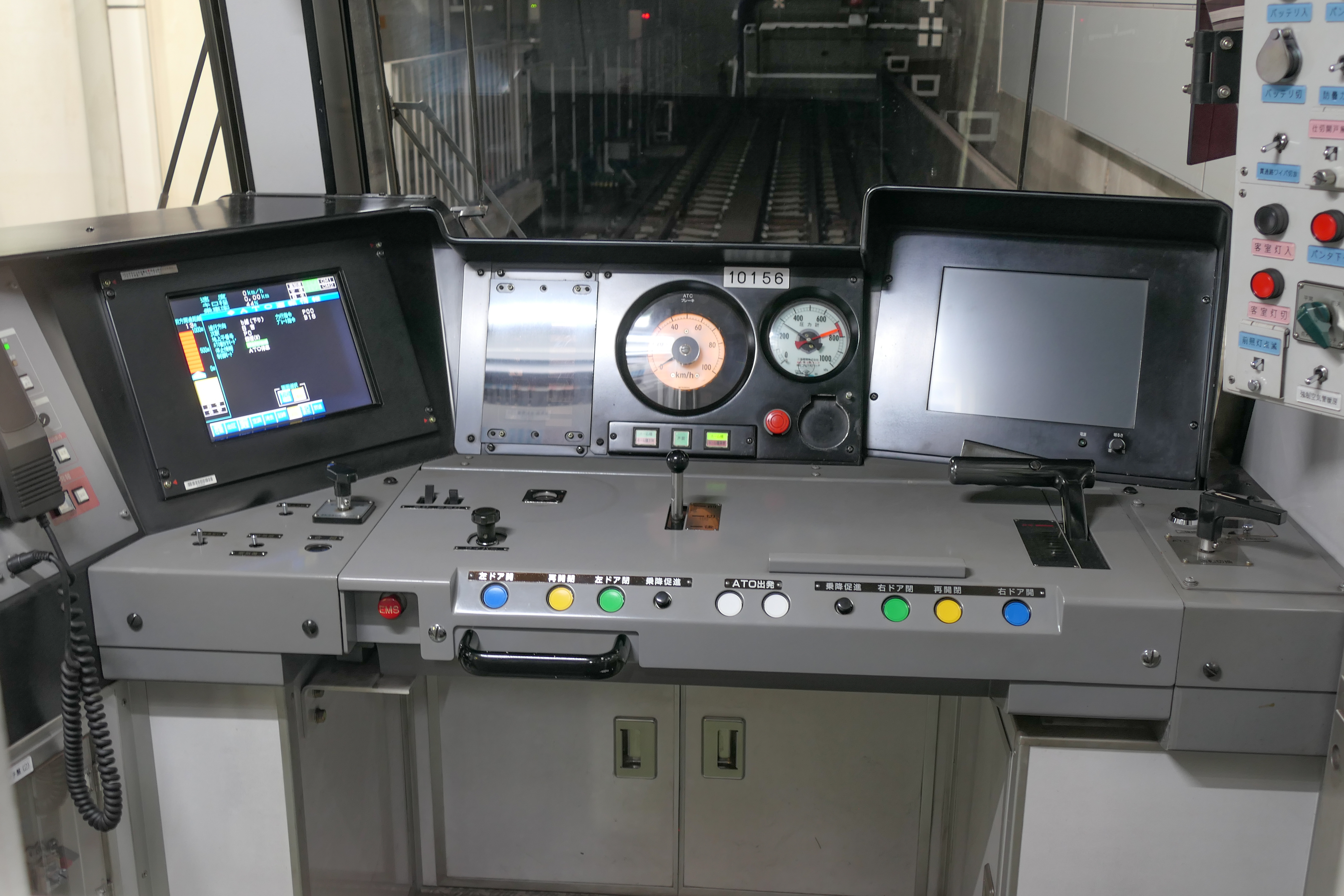
Driver's cab

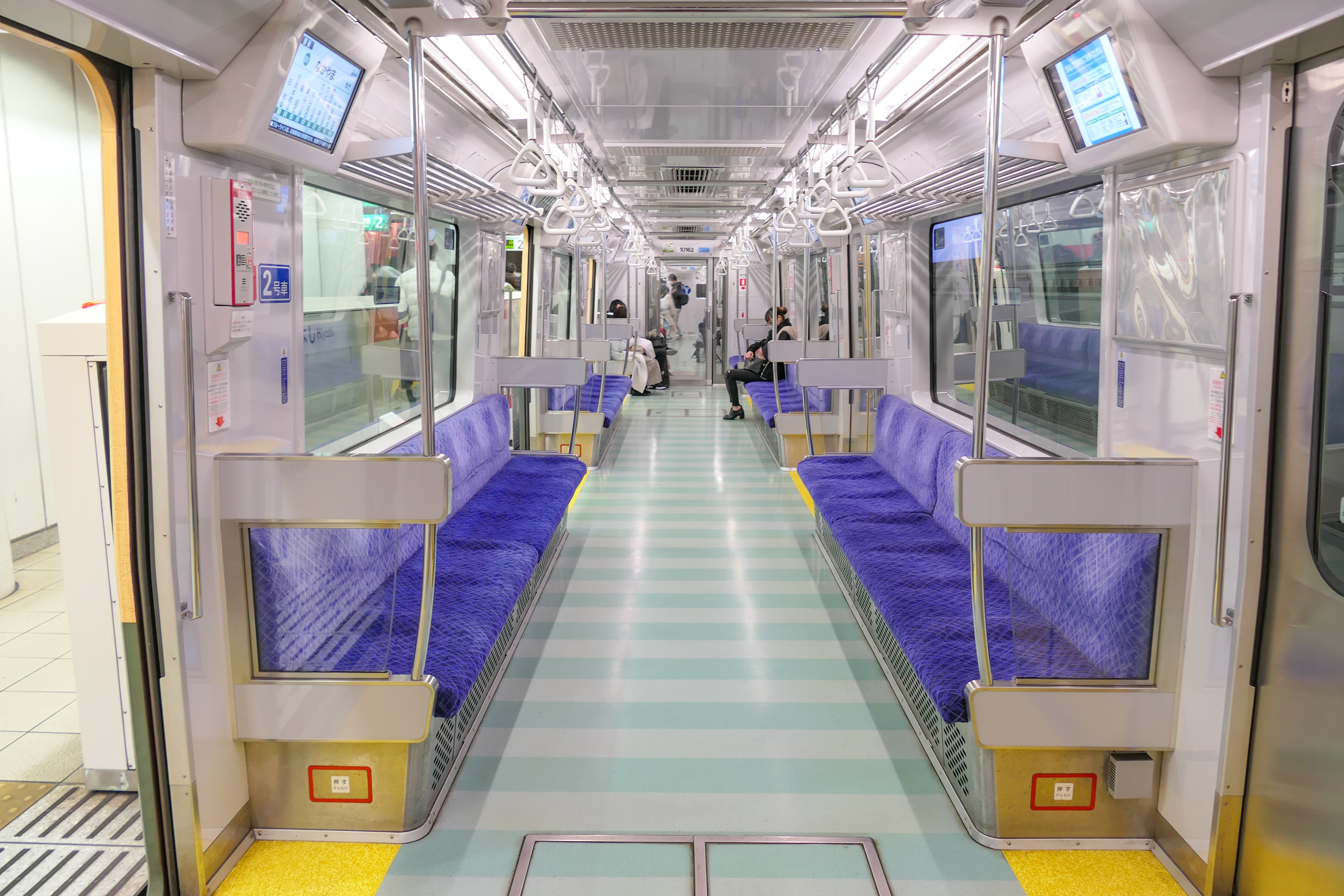
Interior view

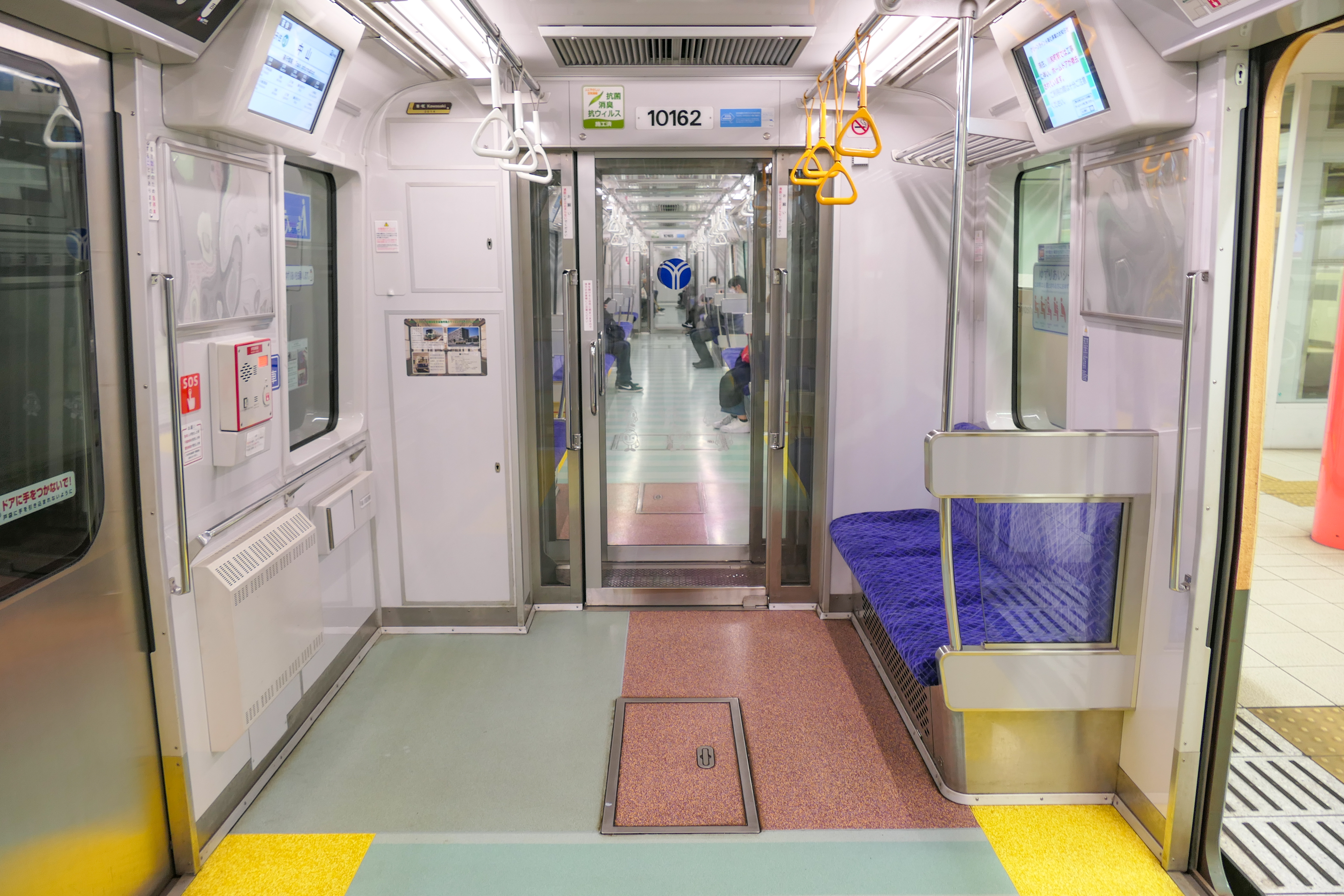
Priority seating

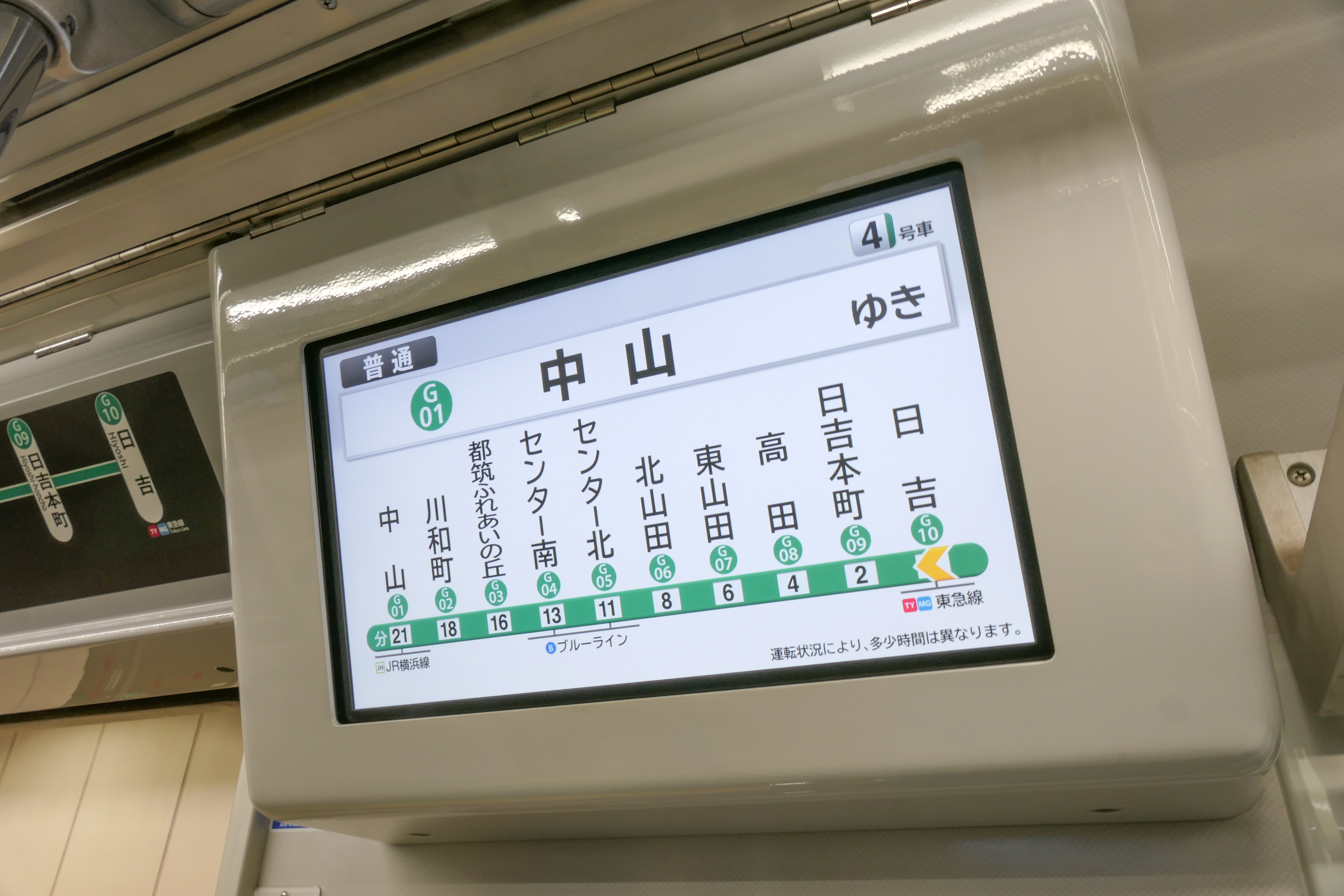
LCD passenger information display

== History ==
The first two pre-production sets, 10011 and 10021 were completed in May 2007 and shipped to Yokohama, arriving in June. The first full-production set, 10031, was delivered in July 2007, being hauled via JR tracks from the Kawasaki factory in Hyōgo Prefecture. The full-production sets feature a number of minor design improvements, including green-coloured gradations externally instead of the blue gradations used on the first two sets.

The trains entered service from 30 March 2008 with the opening of the Green Line.

Two second-batch four-car sets were introduced from the start of the revised timetable on 29 March 2014. These sets feature LED headlights, full-colour LED destination indicators, interior LED lighting, and 17-inch (430 mm) LCD passenger information displays.

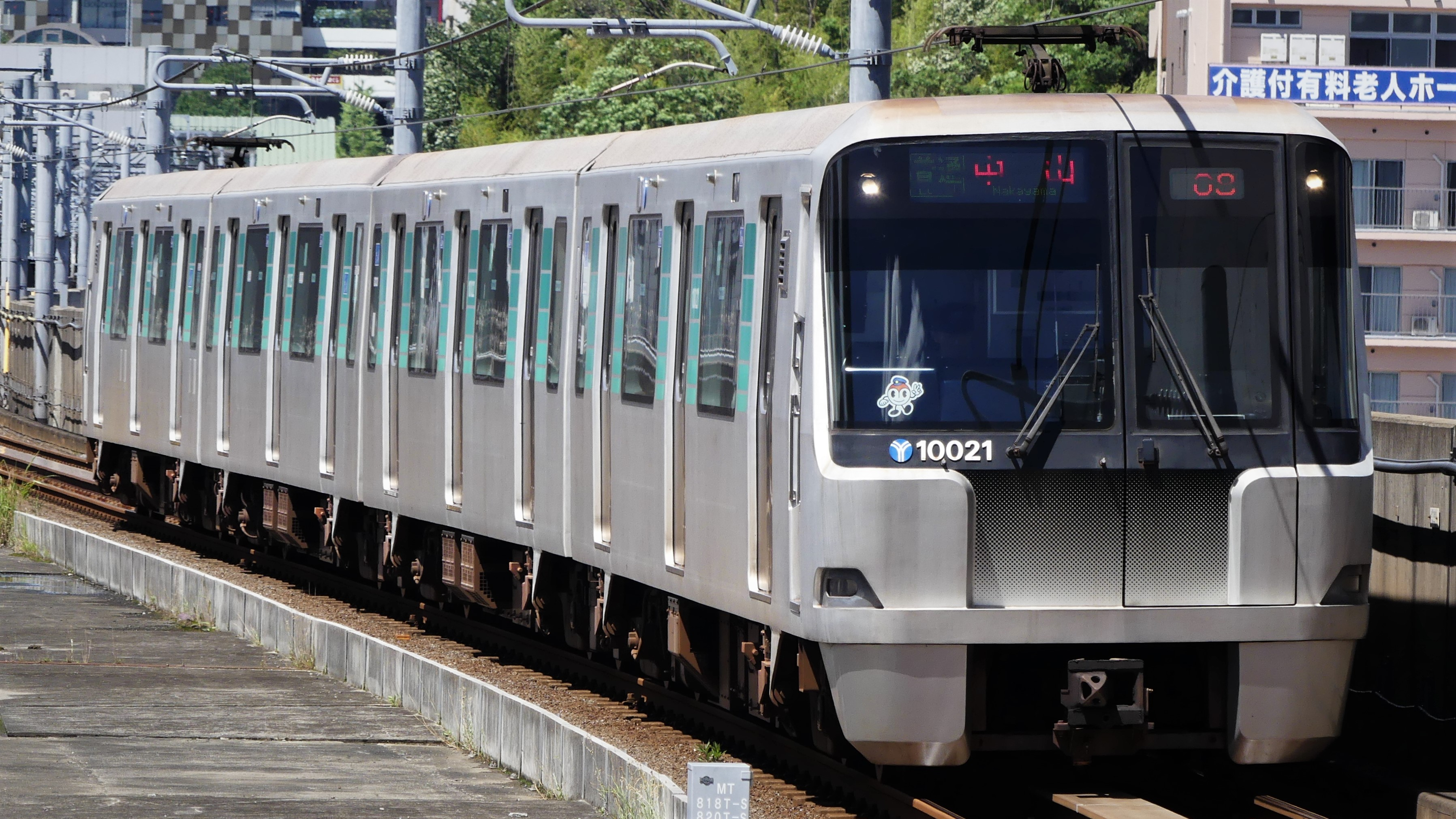
One of the pre-production sets, 10021, approaching Center-Minami in June 2019

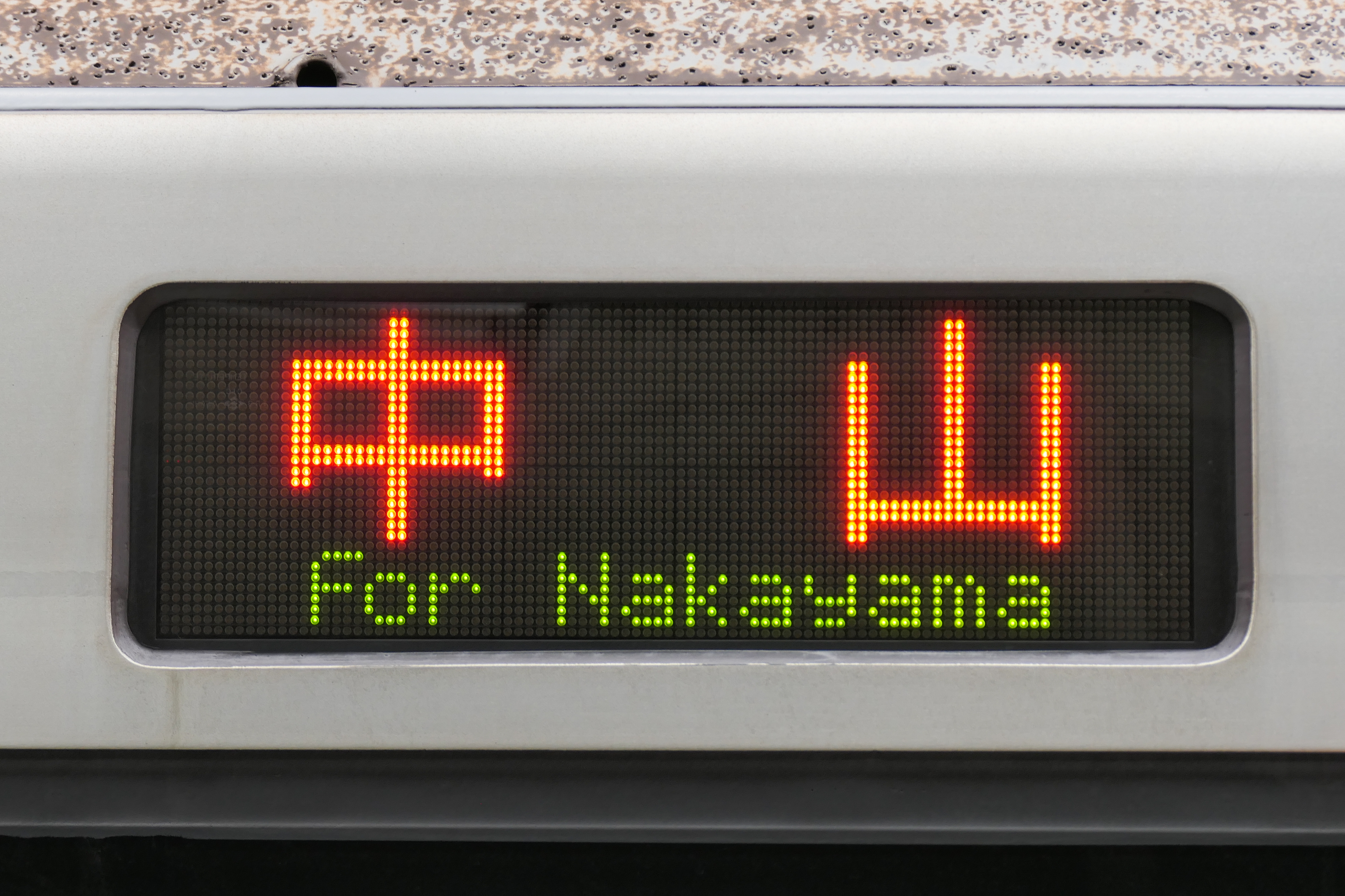
3-colour LED external information display

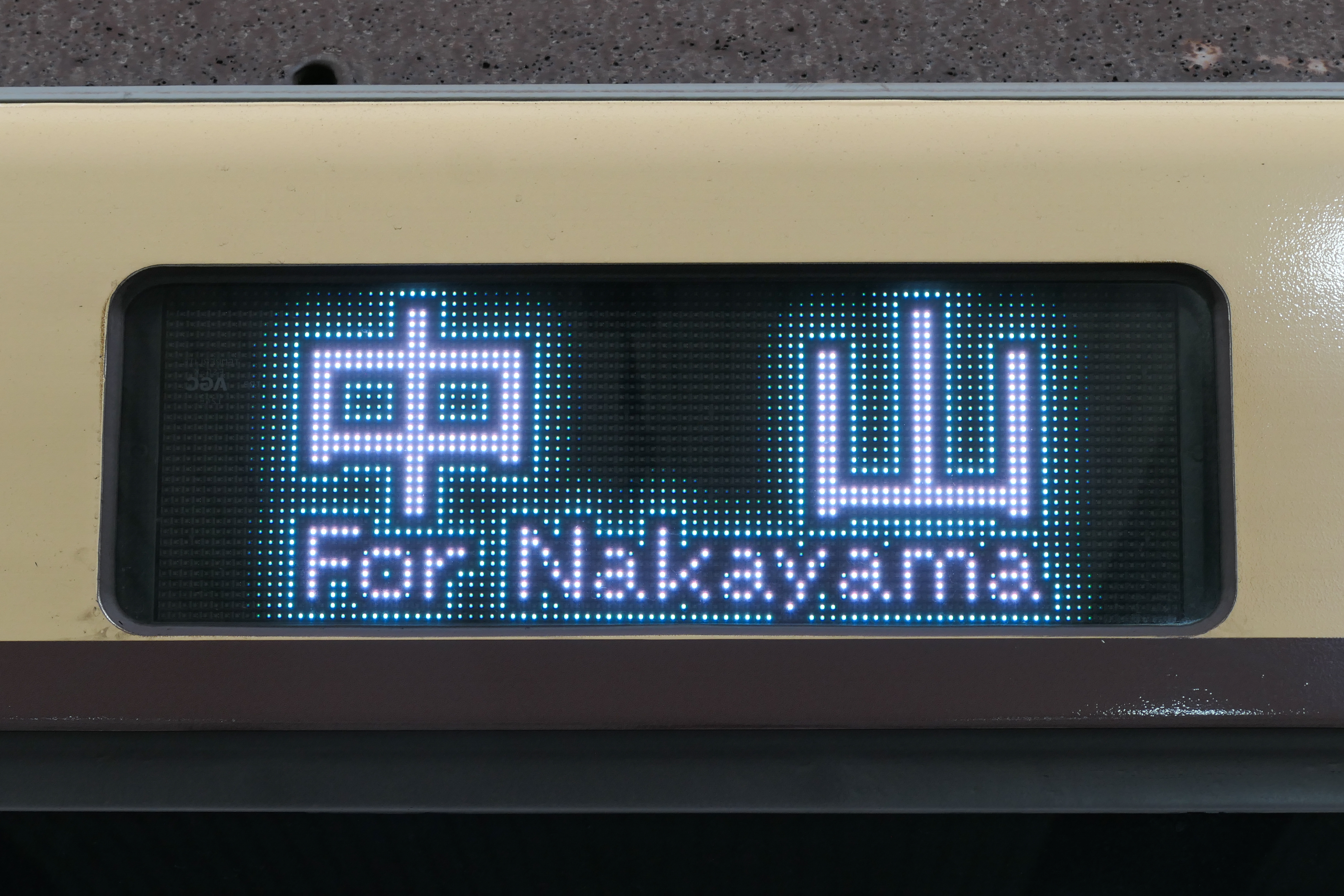
Full-colour LED external information display

== Future plans ==
In 2018, it was announced that ten of the 17 sets in operation would be lengthened to six cars each by 2024 as a measure to ease overcrowding on the Green Line. The first lengthened trainset, 10121 entered revenue service on 24 September 2022.

== Special liveries ==
From 25 February 2018, set 10161 began operating in a special cream and green vinyl wrapping livery based on the livery carried by former Yokohama city tramcars to mark the tenth anniversary of the opening of the Green Line.

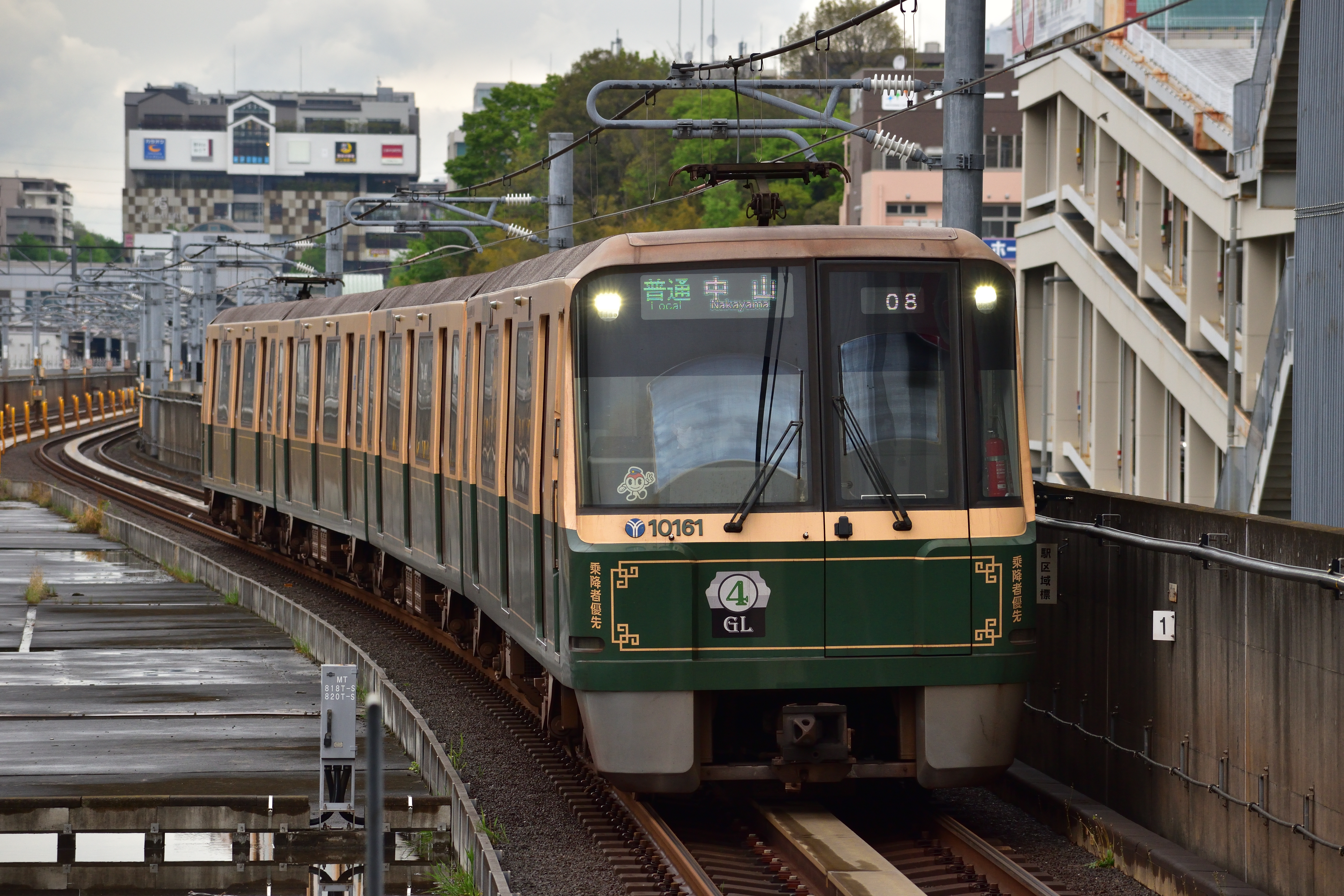
Set 10161 in April 2019
