= Center-Kita Station =

Metro station in Yokohama, Japan

B30 G05 Center-Kita Station センター北駅
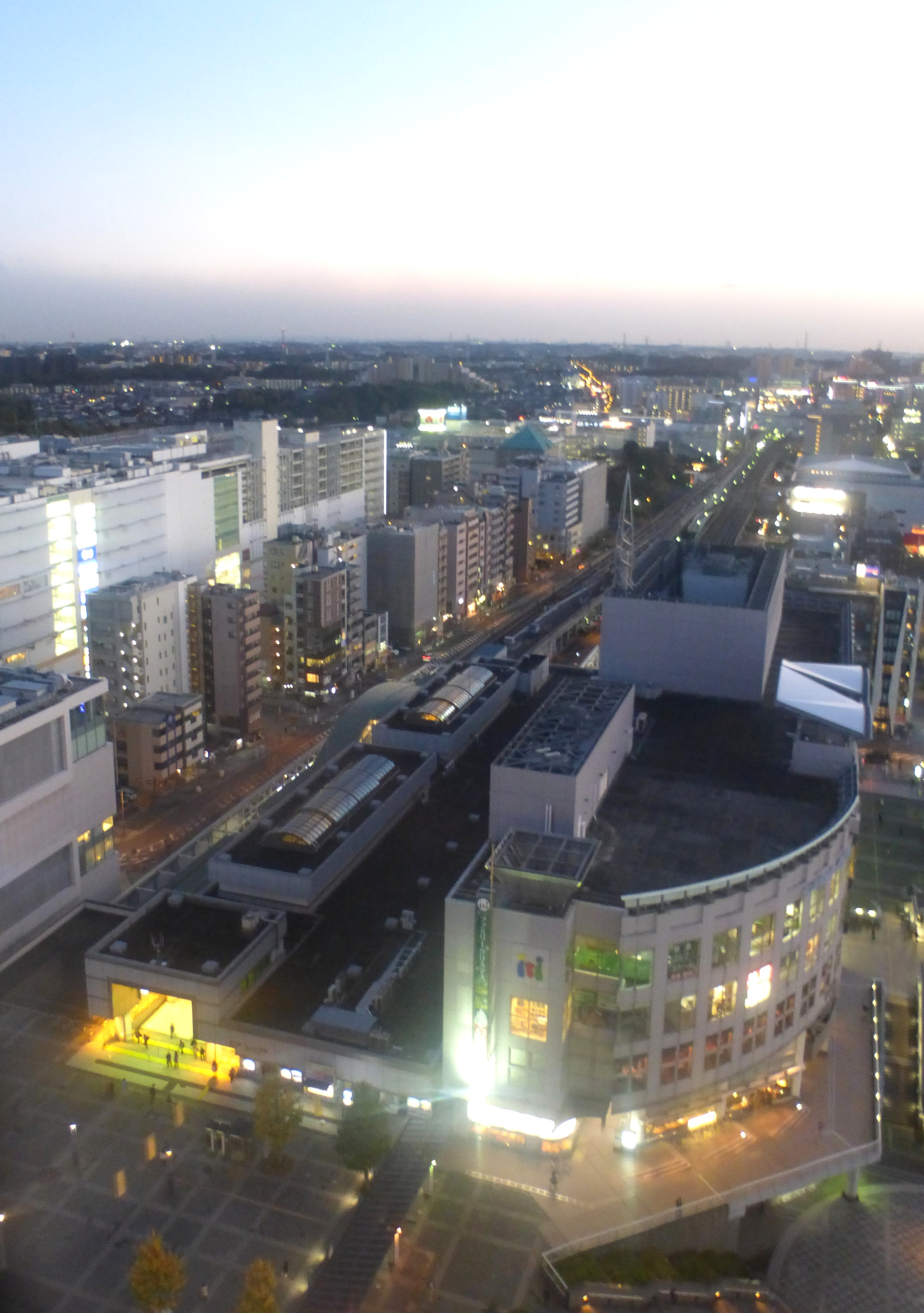
- The station as seen from above in November 2015

General information
- Location: 1-1-1 Nakagawachūō, Tsuzuki, Yokohama （横浜市都筑区中川中央1丁目1-1） Kanagawa Prefecture; Japan
- Coordinates: 35.5534°N 139.5785°E
- System: Yokohama Municipal Subway station
- Operator: Yokohama City Transportation Bureau
- Lines: Blue Line; Green Line
- Platforms: 2 island platforms
- Tracks: 4

Construction
- Structure type: Elevated

Other information
- Station code: B30 (Blue Line); G05 (Green Line)

History
- Opened: 18 March 1993; 33 years ago

Passengers
- 2008: 15,451 daily

Services
Preceding station	Yokohama Municipal Subway	Following station
Center-Minami B29 towards Shonandai	Blue Line Rapid Local	Nakagawa B31 towards Azamino
Center-Minami G04 towards Nakayama	Green Line	Kita-Yamata G06 towards Hiyoshi
Location
- Location within Yokohama Location within Kanagawa Prefecture Location within Japan

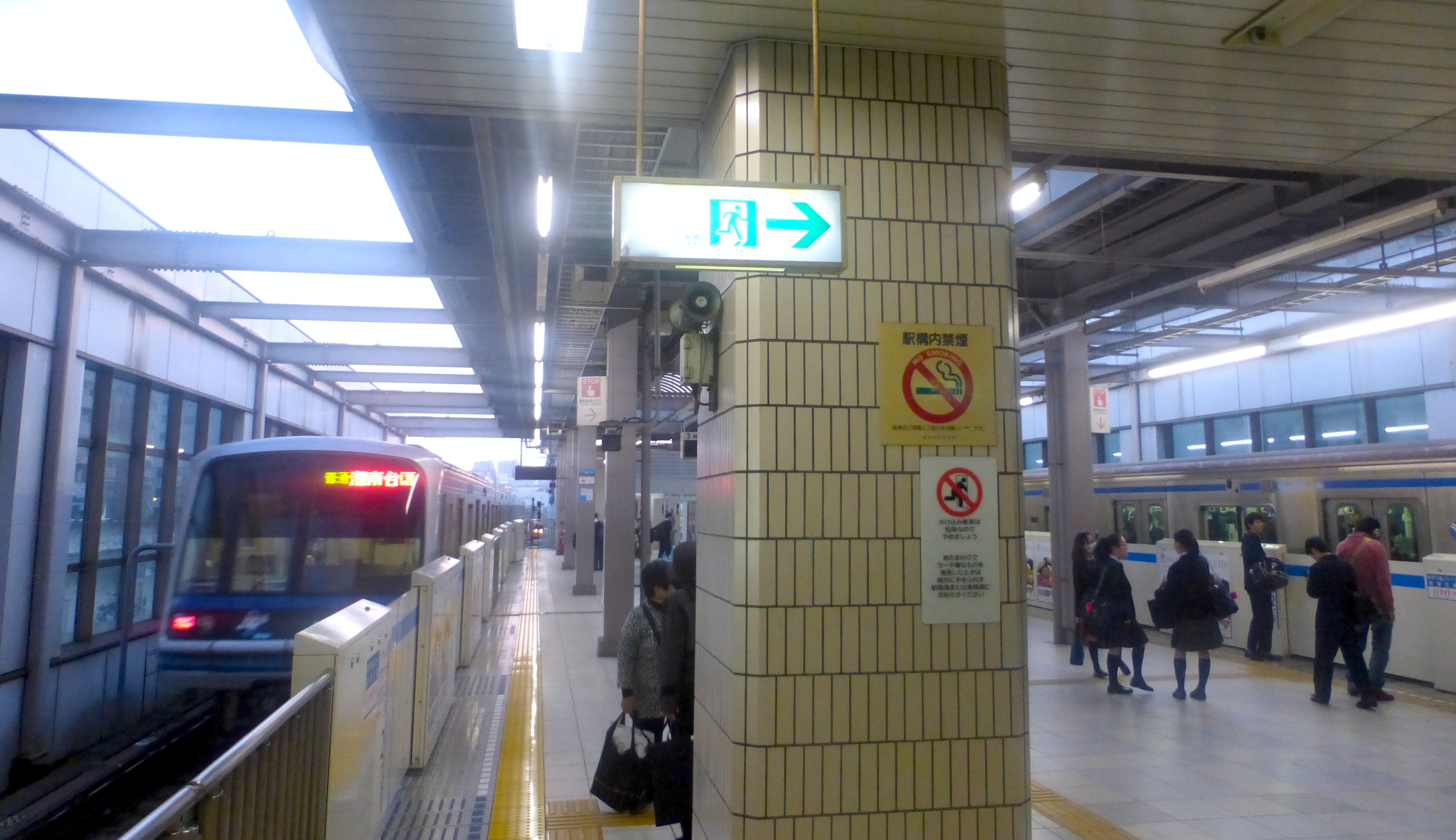
Blue Line platform in November 2015

Center-Kita Station (センター北駅, Sentā-Kita-eki; lit. "Center North") is an above-ground metro station located in Tsuzuki-ku, Yokohama, Kanagawa Prefecture, Japan, operated by the Yokohama Municipal Subway. It is an interchange station for the Green Line and Blue Line (Line 3).

The area surrounding the station (Kōhoku New Town Center) has been designated as one of Yokohama's major residential and commercial centers (formerly classified as a sub-center).

== Lines ==
Center-Kita Station is served by the Blue Line and Green Line. It is 37.3 kilometers from the terminus of the Blue Line at Shōnandai Station and 5.7 kilometers from the terminus of the Green Line at Nakayama Station.

== Station layout ==
Center-Kita Station has two elevated island platforms serving four tracks.

=== Platforms ===
1	■ Green Line	Nakayama
2	■ Green Line	Hiyoshi
3	■ Blue Line	Shin-Yokohama, Yokohama, Kannai, Kamiōoka, Totsuka, Shōnandai
4	■ Blue Line	Azamino

== History ==
Center-Kita Station opened on 18 March 1993 when Line 3 (later named the Blue Line) was extended from Shin-Yokohama Station to Azamino Station. Platform screen doors were installed in April 2007. Services on the Green Line started on 30 March 2008.

== Surrounding area ==
- Hankyu Department Store
- Yokohama History Museum and Otsuka-Saikachido archeological site
- Bosch Hall (Tsuzuki Ward Culture Center) and Bosch R&D Center
- Yokohama International Swimming Pool
- Northport Mall (shopping mall)
- LuRaRa KOHOKU (shopping mall)
- KOHOKU-MINAMO (shopping mall)
- YOTSUBAKO (shopping mall)

== See also ==
- List of railway stations in Japan
