= Kita-Yamata Station =

Metro station in Yokohama, Japan

Coordinates: 35°33′39.61″N 139°35′33.36″E

G06 Kita-Yamata Station 北山田駅
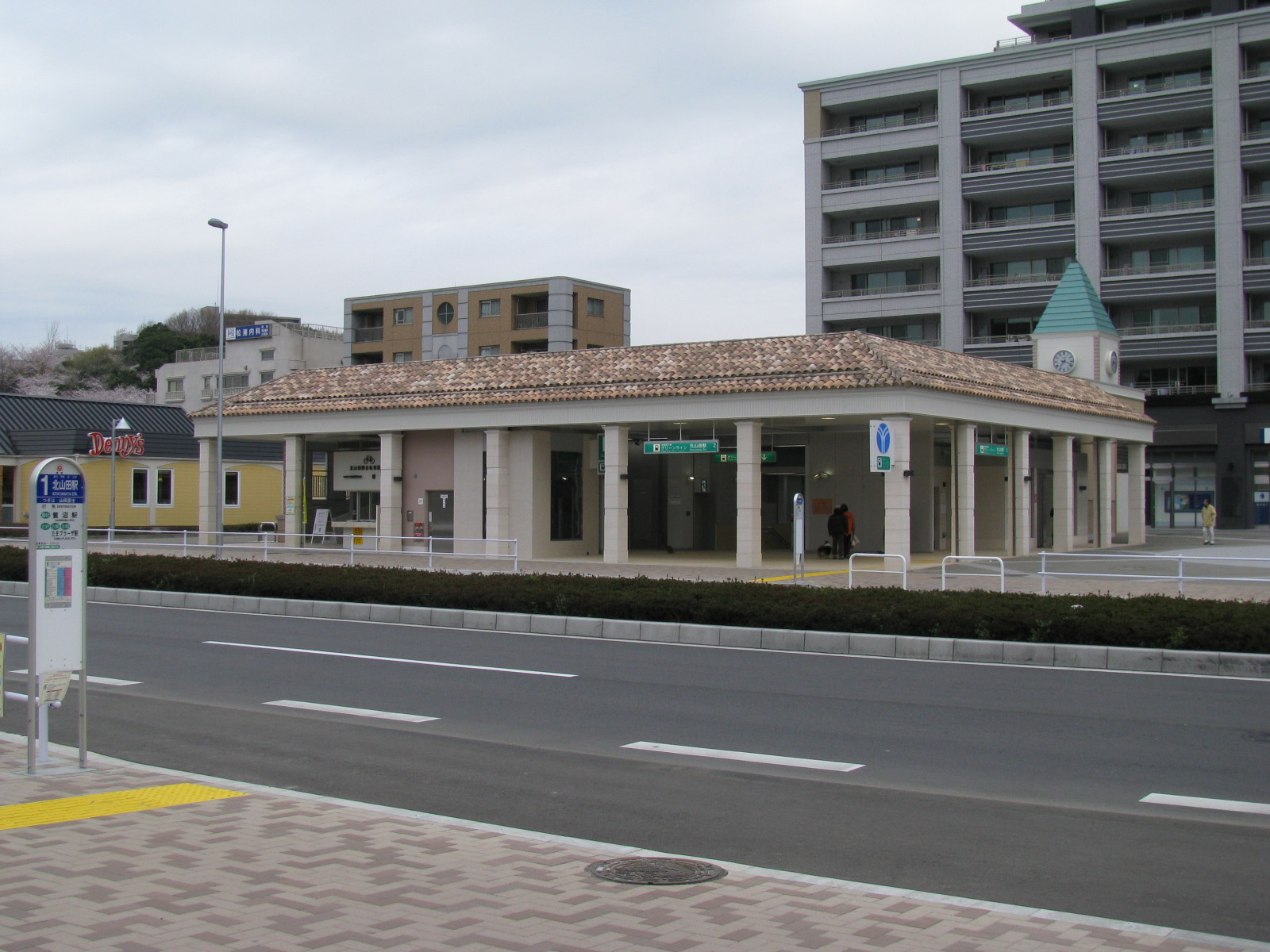

General information
- Location: 1-6-11 Kitayamata, Tsuzuki, Yokohama, Kanagawa （横浜市都筑区北山田一丁目6-11） Japan
- System: Yokohama Municipal Subway station
- Operator: Yokohama City Transportation Bureau
- Line: Green Line
- Platforms: 1 island platform
- Tracks: 2

Construction
- Structure type: Underground

Other information
- Station code: G06

History
- Opened: 30 March 2008; 18 years ago

Passengers
- 2008: 8,096 daily

Services
Preceding station	Yokohama Municipal Subway	Following station
Center-Kita G05 towards Nakayama	Green Line	Higashi-Yamata G07 towards Hiyoshi
Location
- Location within Yokohama Location within Kanagawa Prefecture Location within Japan

Kita-Yamata Station (北山田駅, Kita-Yamata-eki) is a metro station located in Tsuzuki Ward, Yokohama, Kanagawa Prefecture, Japan. It is served by the Yokohama Municipal Subway’s Green Line (Line 4) and is 7.4 kilometers from the terminus of the Green Line at Nakayama.

== Lines ==
- Yokohama Municipal Subway
  - Green Line

== Station layout ==
Kita-Yamata Station has a single underground island platform serving two tracks located four stories underground.

=== Platforms ===
1	■ Green Line	Center-Minami ・Nakayama
2	■ Green Line	Hiyoshi

== History ==
Kita-Yamata Station opened on 30 March 2008 when the Green Line started operation.

== Surrounding area ==
- Yokohama International Swimming Pool
- Salesio Gakuin High School
