= Kawawachō Station =

Metro station in Yokohama, Japan

Coordinates: 35.5281°N 139.5487°E

G02 Kawawachō Station 川和町駅
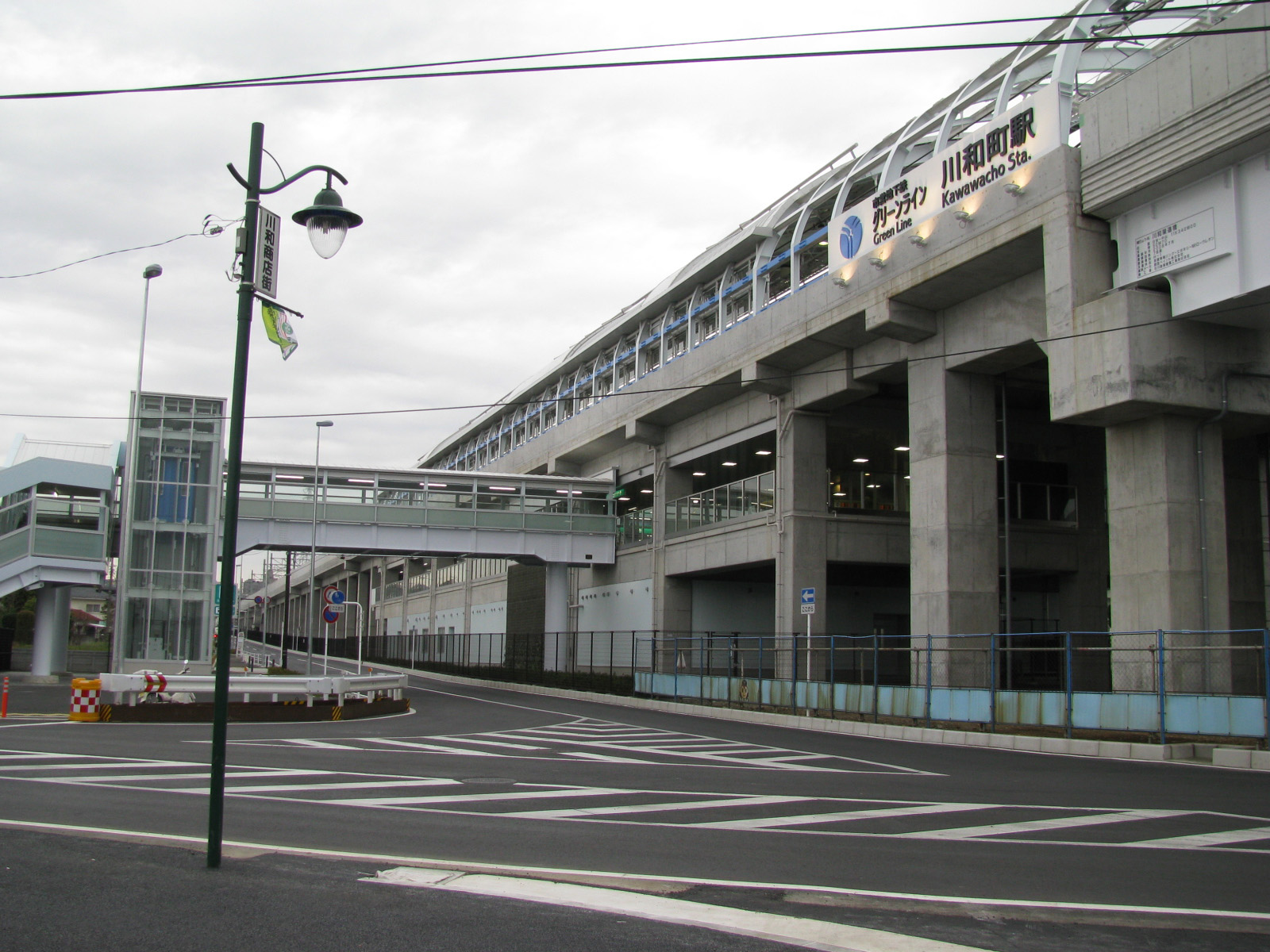
- Kawawachō Station

General information
- Location: 1252 Aza Nakamura, Tsuzuki, Yokohama, Kanagawa （横浜市都筑区字中村1252） Japan
- System: Yokohama Municipal Subway station
- Operator: Yokohama City Transportation Bureau
- Line: Green Line
- Platforms: 1 island platform
- Tracks: 2

Construction
- Structure type: Elevated

Other information
- Station code: G02

History
- Opened: 30 March 2008; 18 years ago

Passengers
- March 30, 2008: 2,157 daily

Services
Preceding station	Yokohama Municipal Subway	Following station
Nakayama G01 Terminus	Green Line	Tsuzuki-fureainooka G03 towards Hiyoshi
Location
- Location within Yokohama Location within Kanagawa Prefecture Location within Japan

Kawawachō Station (川和町駅, Kawawachō-eki) is a metro station located in Tsuzuki Ward, Yokohama, Kanagawa Prefecture, Japan. It is served by the Yokohama Municipal Subway’s Green Line (Line 4) and is 1.7 kilometers from the terminus of the Green Line at Nakayama.

== Lines ==
- Yokohama Municipal Subway
  - Green Line

== Station layout ==
Kawawachō Station is an elevated station with a single island platform serving four elevated tracks. The station building is located underneath the tracks and platform. The platforms are numbered Platform 3 and Platform 4. There is no Platform 1 or Platform 2, and these tracks are used as a rail yard to remove train carriages from the main rail lines of the Green Line.

=== Platforms ===
1	■ Green Line	Nakayama
2	■ Green Line	Center-Minami ・Hiyoshi

== History ==
Kawawachō Station opened on 30 March 2008 when the Green Line started operation.
