= Tsuzuki-fureainooka Station =

Metro station in Yokohama, Japan

Coordinates: 35.5365°N 139.5613°E

G03 Tsuzuki-fureainooka Station 都筑ふれあいの丘駅
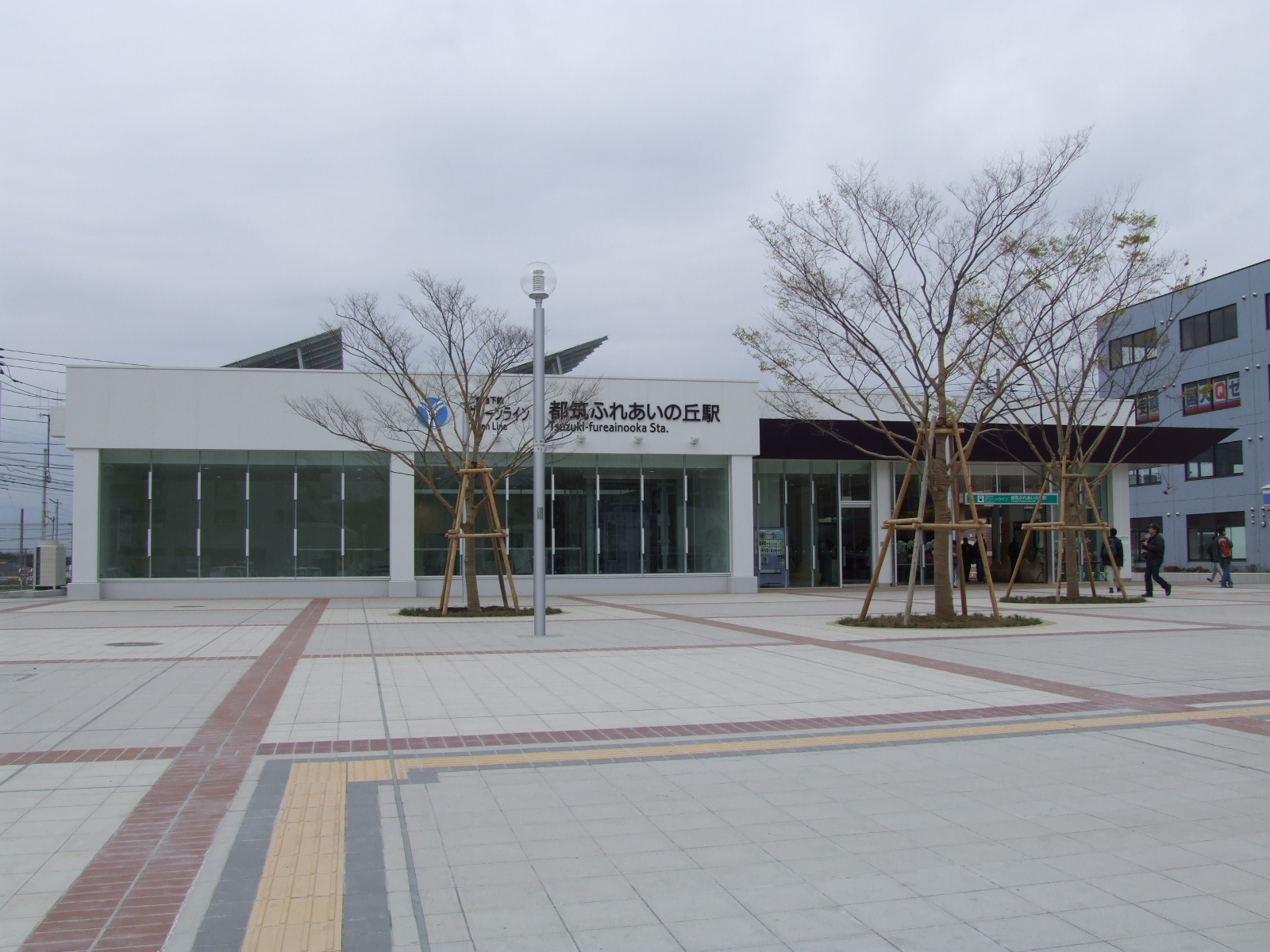

General information
- Location: 11-1 Kuzugaya, Tsuzuki, Yokohama, Kanagawa （横浜市都筑区葛が谷11-1） Japan
- System: Yokohama Municipal Subway station
- Operator: Yokohama City Transportation Bureau
- Line: Green Line
- Platforms: 1 island platform
- Tracks: 2
- Connections: Bus stop

Construction
- Structure type: Underground

Other information
- Station code: G03

History
- Opened: 30 March 2008; 18 years ago

Passengers
- 2008: 5,571 daily

Services
Preceding station	Yokohama Municipal Subway	Following station
Kawawachō G02 towards Nakayama	Green Line	Center-Minami G04 towards Hiyoshi
Location
- Location within Yokohama Location within Kanagawa Prefecture Location within Japan

Tsuzuki-fureainooka Station (都筑ふれあいの丘駅, Tsuzuki-fureainooka-eki) is a metro station located in Tsuzuki Ward, Yokohama, Kanagawa Prefecture, Japan. It is served by the Yokohama Municipal Subway’s Green Line (Line 4) and is 3.1 kilometers from the terminus of the Green Line at Nakayama.

== Lines ==
- Yokohama Municipal Subway
  - Green Line

== Station layout ==
Tsuzuki-fureainooka Station has a single underground island platform serving two tracks. The station building is located above ground.

=== Platforms ===
1	■ Green Line	Nakayama
2	■ Green Line	Center-Minami ・Hiyoshi

== History ==
Tsuzuki-fureainooka Station opened on 30 March 2008 when the Green Line started operation.
