= Yokohama City Library =

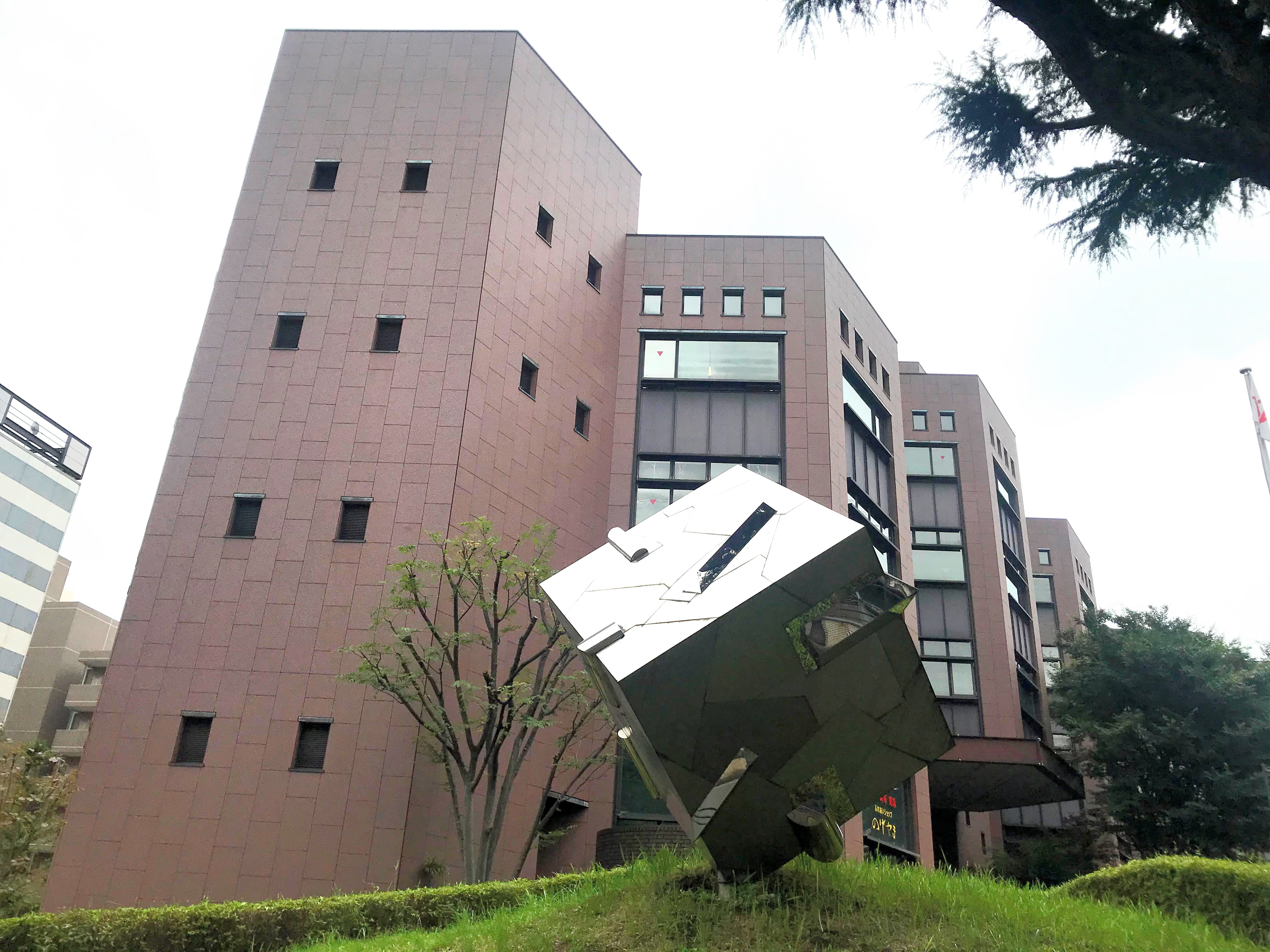
Yokohama Central Library

Yokohama City Library (横浜市立図書館, Yokohama Shiritsu toshokan) is the city public library system for Yokohama, Japan.

The Yokohama City Library was opened on the 11th June 1921, and has one central library and 17 branches. The central library is located in the Nishi Ward, and each ward of Yokohama city has one branch. The Yokohama city library holds 4,057,293 volumes.

On 2024, it was reported that Yokohama city plan to enlarge the city library.
