= Green Line (Yokohama) =

Rapid transit line in Japan

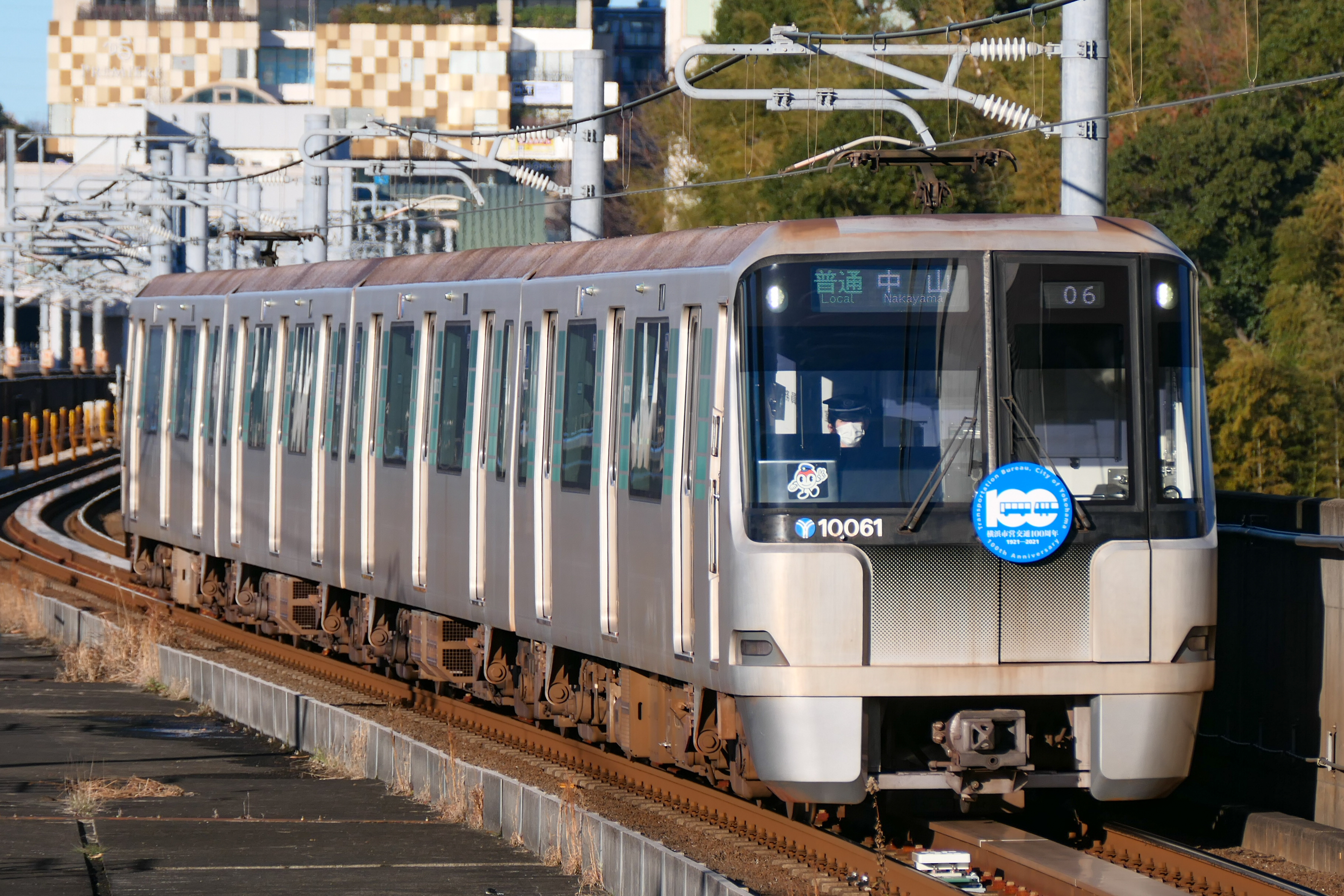
- A Green Line 10000 series train in December 2021

Overview
- Native name: グリーンライン
- Line number: 4
- Locale: Yokohama
- Termini: Nakayama; Hiyoshi
- Stations: 10

Service
- Type: Rapid transit
- System: Yokohama Municipal Subway
- Operator: Yokohama City Transportation Bureau
- Depot: Kawawa
- Rolling stock: 10000 series
- Daily ridership: 129,104 daily (JFY2014)

History
- Opened: 30 March 2008; 18 years ago

Technical
- Line length: 13.0 km (8.1 mi)
- Track gauge: 1,435 mm (4 ft 8 1/2 in) standard gauge
- Electrification: Overhead line, 1,500 V DC
- Operating speed: 80 km/h (50 mph)
Route map
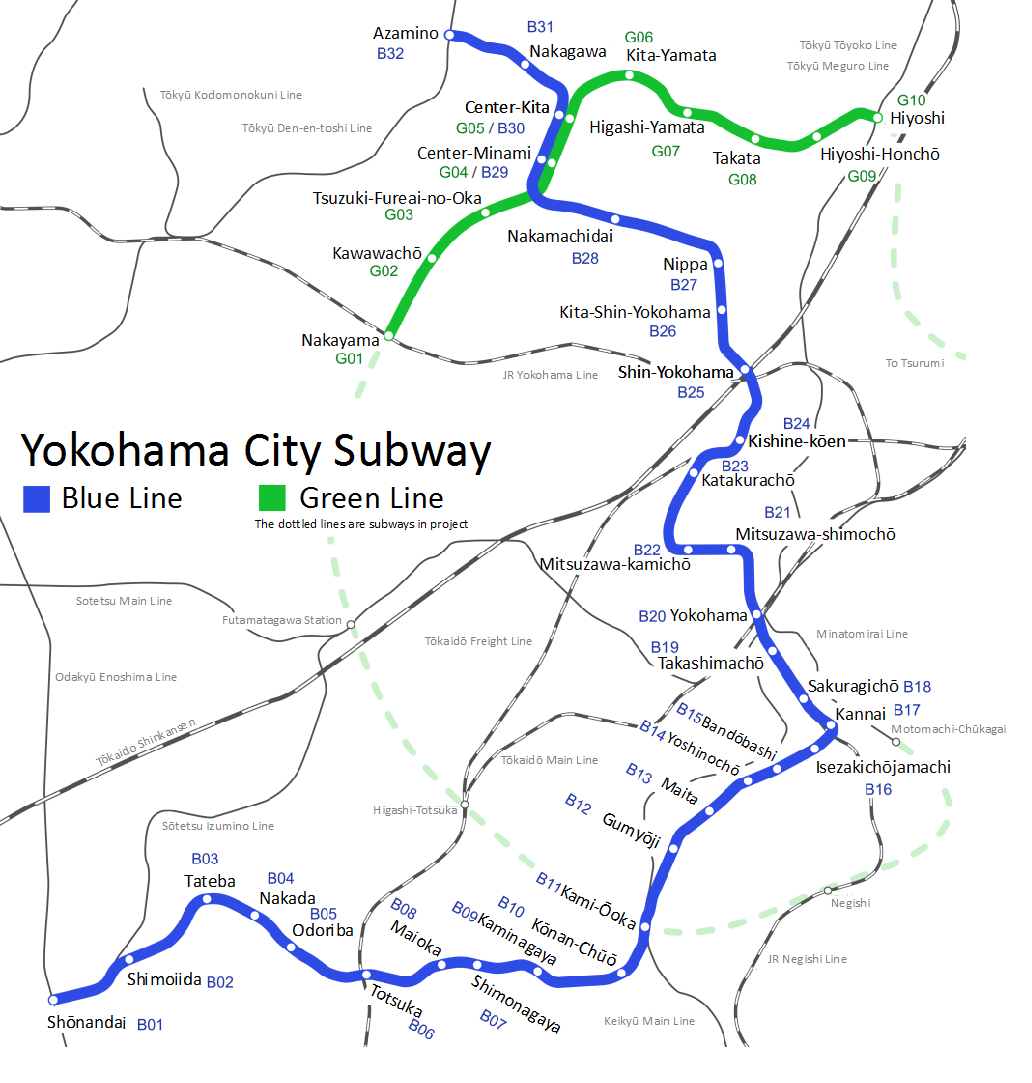

The Green Line (Japanese: グリーンライン, Hepburn: Gurīn Rain) is a rapid transit line serving Yokohama in Kanagawa Prefecture, Japan. It is the shorter of the two lines in the Yokohama Municipal Subway system operated by Yokohama City Transportation Bureau. Its formal designation is Line 4, and it is the first section to be opened of a proposed Yokohama Circular Railway (横浜環状鉄道, Yokohama Kanjō Tetsudō).

The Green Line links Nakayama on the JR East Yokohama Line and Hiyoshi on the Tokyu Toyoko Line with 13.0 kilometers (8.1 mi) of track and 10 stations. Construction began in 2001 and the new line started operating on 30 March 2008. It uses linear motor propulsion and a full journey takes approximately 21 minutes one way.

== Stations ==
Platforms are above ground at Kawawachō, Center-Kita, and Center-Minami stations and underground at other stations. All stations are located in the city of Yokohama.

No.	Station	Distance in km (mi)	Transfers	Location (ward)
G01	Nakayama 中山	0.0 (0)	Yokohama Line	Midori
G02	Kawawachō 川和町	1.7 (1.1)		Tsuzuki
G03	Tsuzuki-fureainooka 都筑ふれあいの丘	3.1 (1.9)		Tsuzuki
G04	Center-Minami センター南	4.8 (3.0)	Blue Line (B29)	Tsuzuki
G05	Center-Kita センター北	5.7 (3.5)	Blue Line (B30)	Tsuzuki
G06	Kita-Yamata 北山田	7.4 (4.6)		Tsuzuki
G07	Higashi-Yamata 東山田	8.8 (5.5)		Tsuzuki
G08	Takata 高田	10.3 (6.4)		Kōhoku
G09	Hiyoshi-Honchō 日吉本町	11.6 (7.2)		Kōhoku
G10	Hiyoshi 日吉	13.0 (8.1)	Tōyoko Line; Meguro Line; Tōkyū Shin-Yokohama Line	Kōhoku

== Rolling stock ==
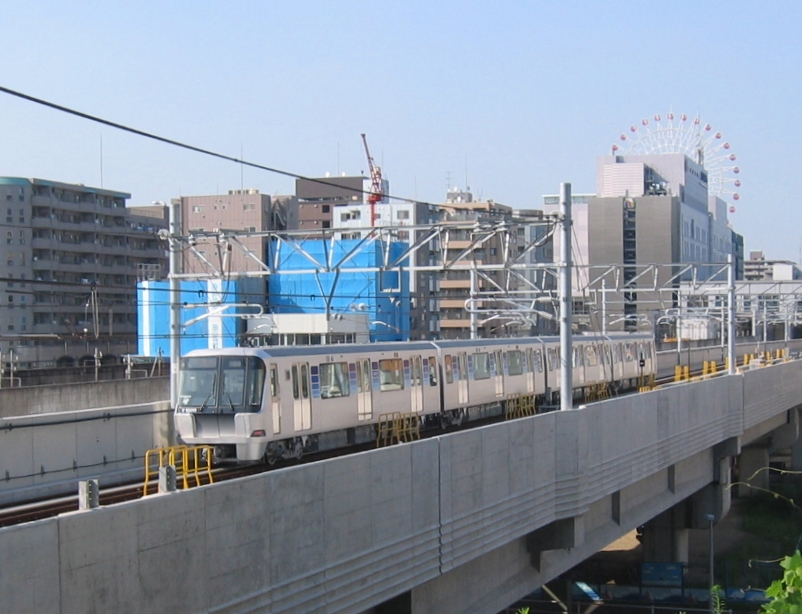
A 10000 series train under test on the Green Line in July 2006

The Green Line is operated by 17 4-car 10000 series EMUs. In 2018, it was announced that 10 of these would be lengthened to six cars each by 2024 as a measure to ease overcrowding on the Green Line. By April 2023, lengthening of 4-car trains to 6-car trains had commenced, and by the end of fiscal year 2024, there will be 10 x 6-car trains.
