= Center-Minami Station =

Metro station in Yokohama, Japan

B29 G04 Center-Minami Station センター南駅
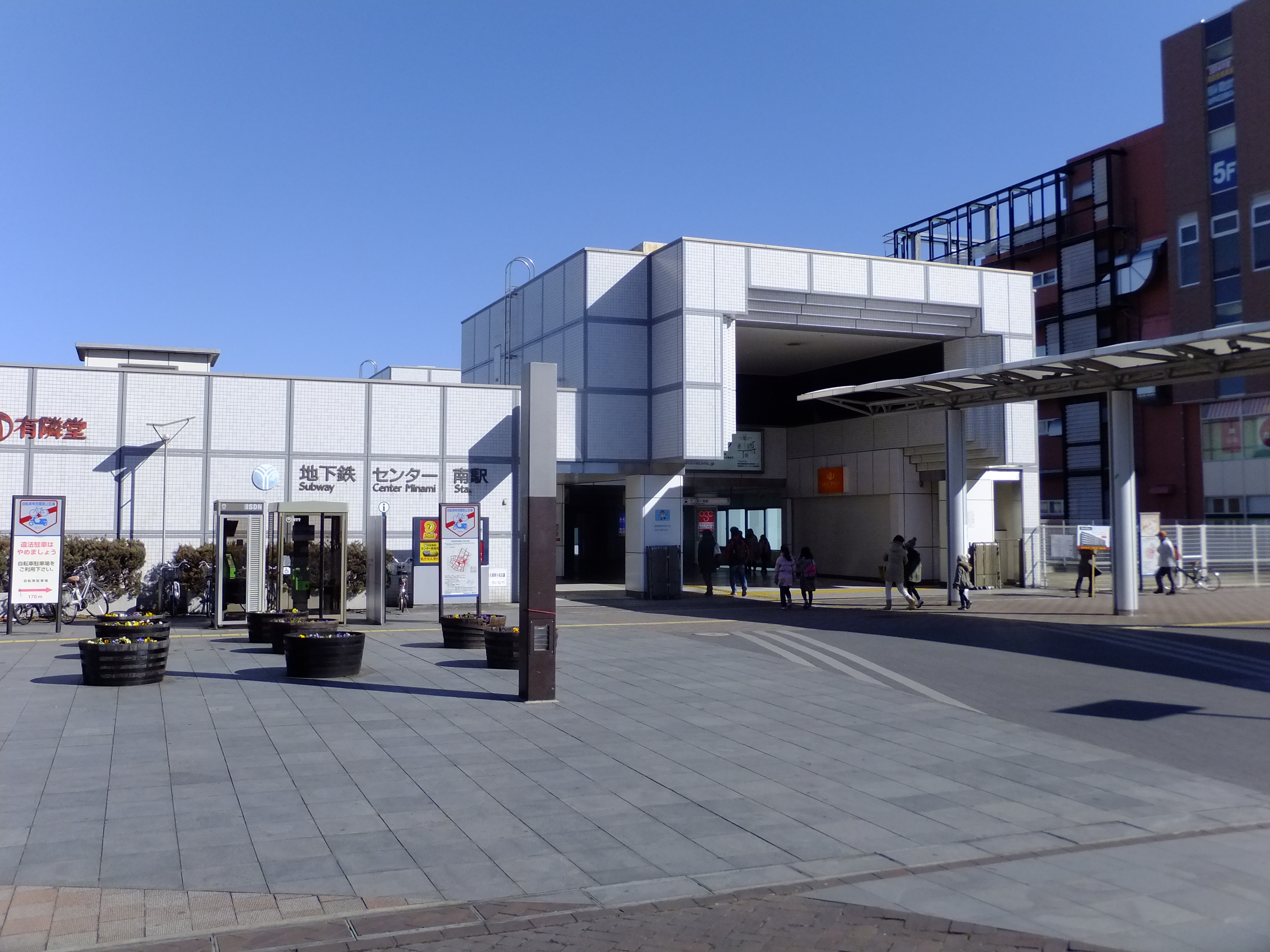
- Center-Minami Station in February 2015

General information
- Location: 1-1 Chigasakichūō, Tsuzuki, Yokohama （横浜市都筑区茅ヶ崎中央1-1） Kanagawa Prefecture; Japan
- Coordinates: 35°32′43.71″N 139°34′27.44″E
- System: Yokohama Municipal Subway station
- Operator: Yokohama City Transportation Bureau
- Lines: Blue Line; Green Line
- Platforms: 2 island platforms
- Tracks: 4

Other information
- Station code: B29 (Blue Line); G04 (Green Line)

History
- Opened: 18 March 1993; 33 years ago

Services
Preceding station	Yokohama Municipal Subway	Following station
Nakamachidai B28 towards Shonandai	Blue Line Rapid Local	Center-Kita B30 towards Azamino
Tsuzuki-fureainooka G03 towards Nakayama	Green Line	Center-Kita G05 towards Hiyoshi
Location
- Location within Yokohama Location within Kanagawa Prefecture Location within Japan

Center-Minami Station (センター南駅, Sentā-Minami-eki; lit. "Center South") is an above-ground metro station located in Tsuzuki-ku, Yokohama, Kanagawa Prefecture, Japan, operated by the Yokohama Municipal Subway. It is an interchange station for the Green Line and Blue Line (Line 3).

The area surrounding the station (Kōhoku New Town Center) has been designated as one of Yokohama's major residential and commercial centers (formerly classified as a sub-center).

== Lines ==
Center-Minami Station is served by the Blue Line and Green Line. It is 36.4 kilometers from the terminus of the Blue Line at Shōnandai Station and 4.8 kilometers from the terminus of the Green Line at Nakayama Station.

== Station layout ==
Center-Minami Station has two elevated island platforms serving four tracks. The ground-level station building is located underneath the tracks and platforms.

=== Platforms ===
1	■ Green Line	Nakayama
2	■ Green Line	Hiyoshi
3	■ Blue Line	Shin-Yokohama, Yokohama, Kannai, Totsuka, Shōnandai
4	■ Blue Line	Azamino

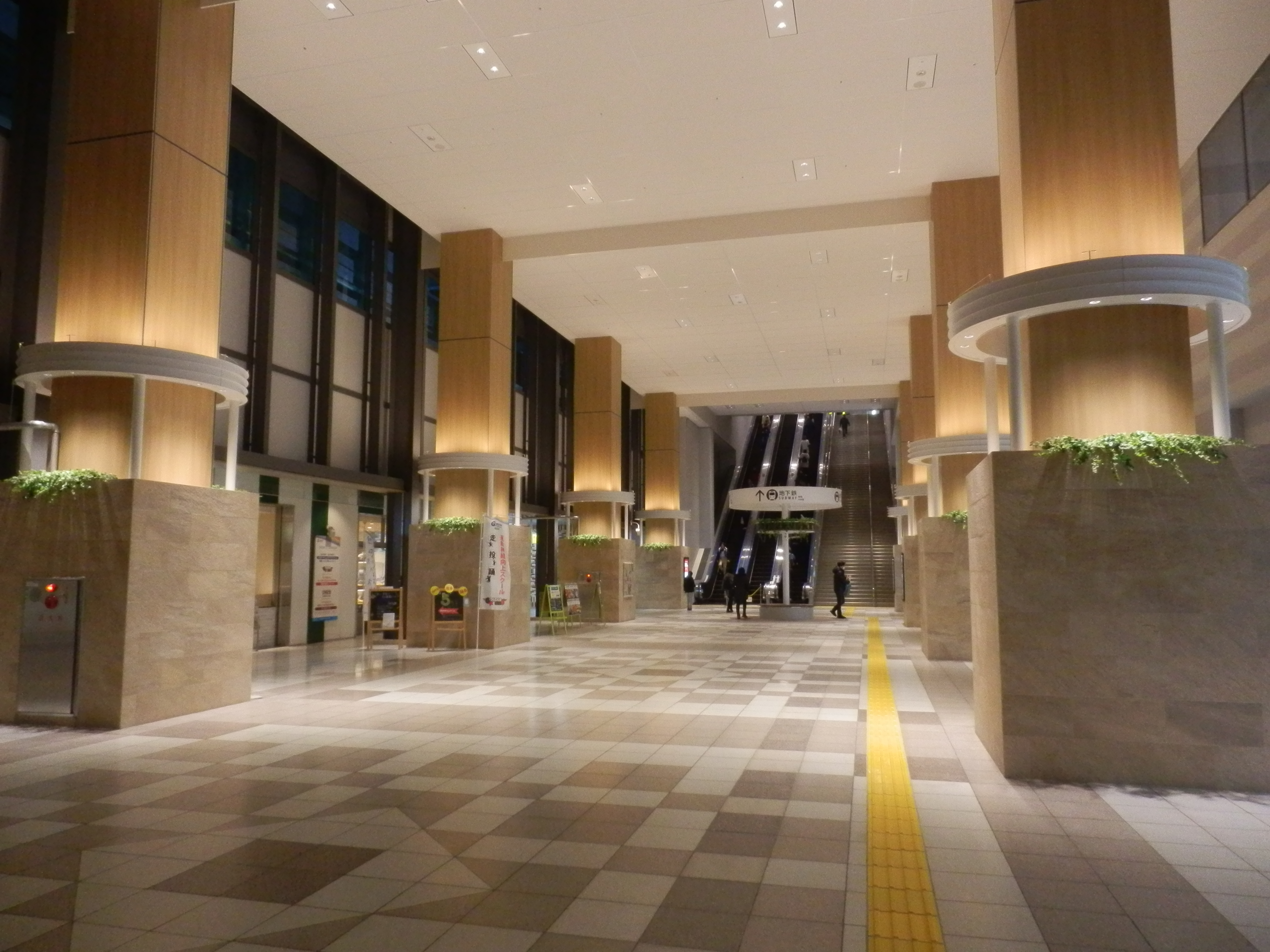
Concourse

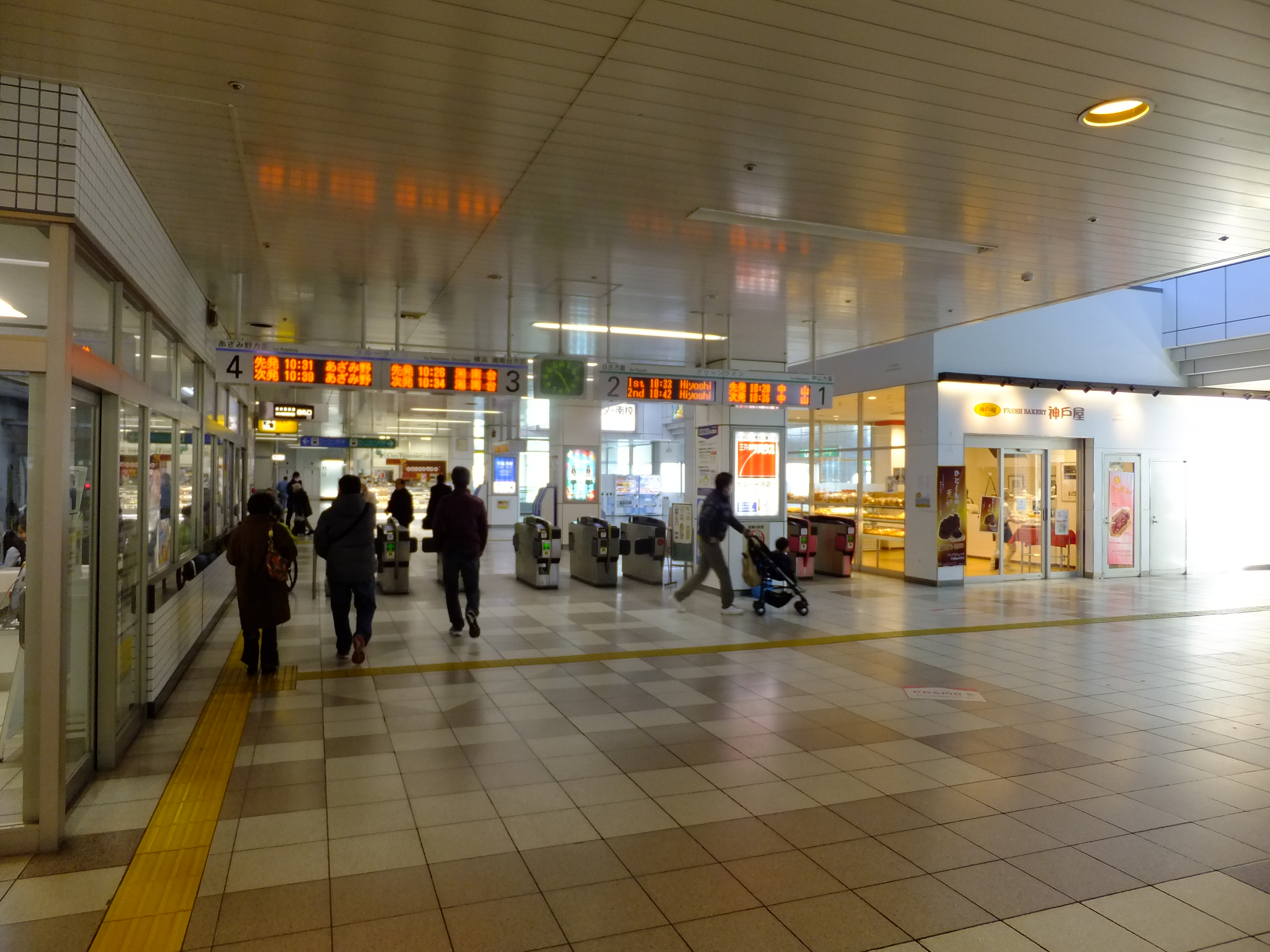
Ticket gates

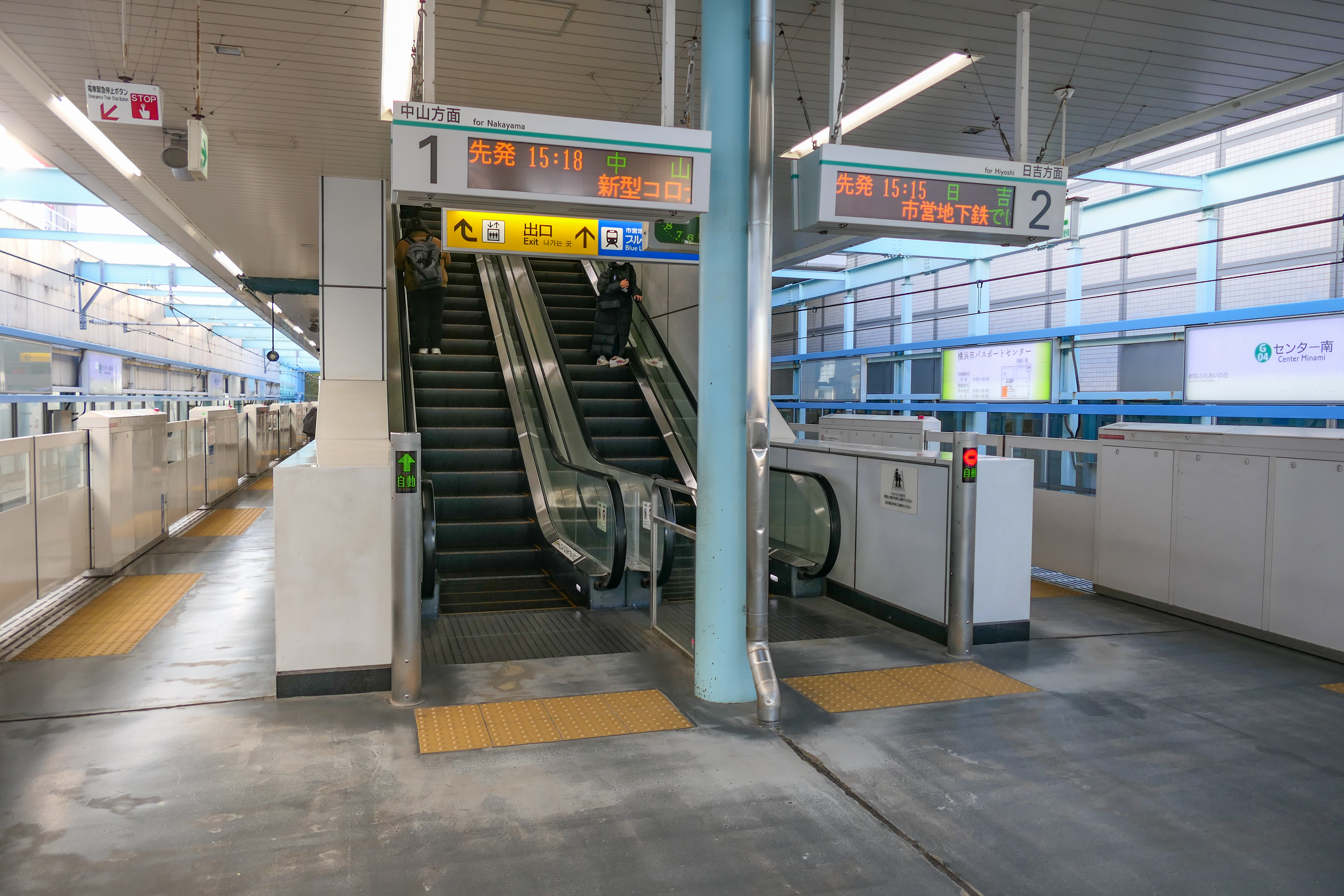
Green Line platform

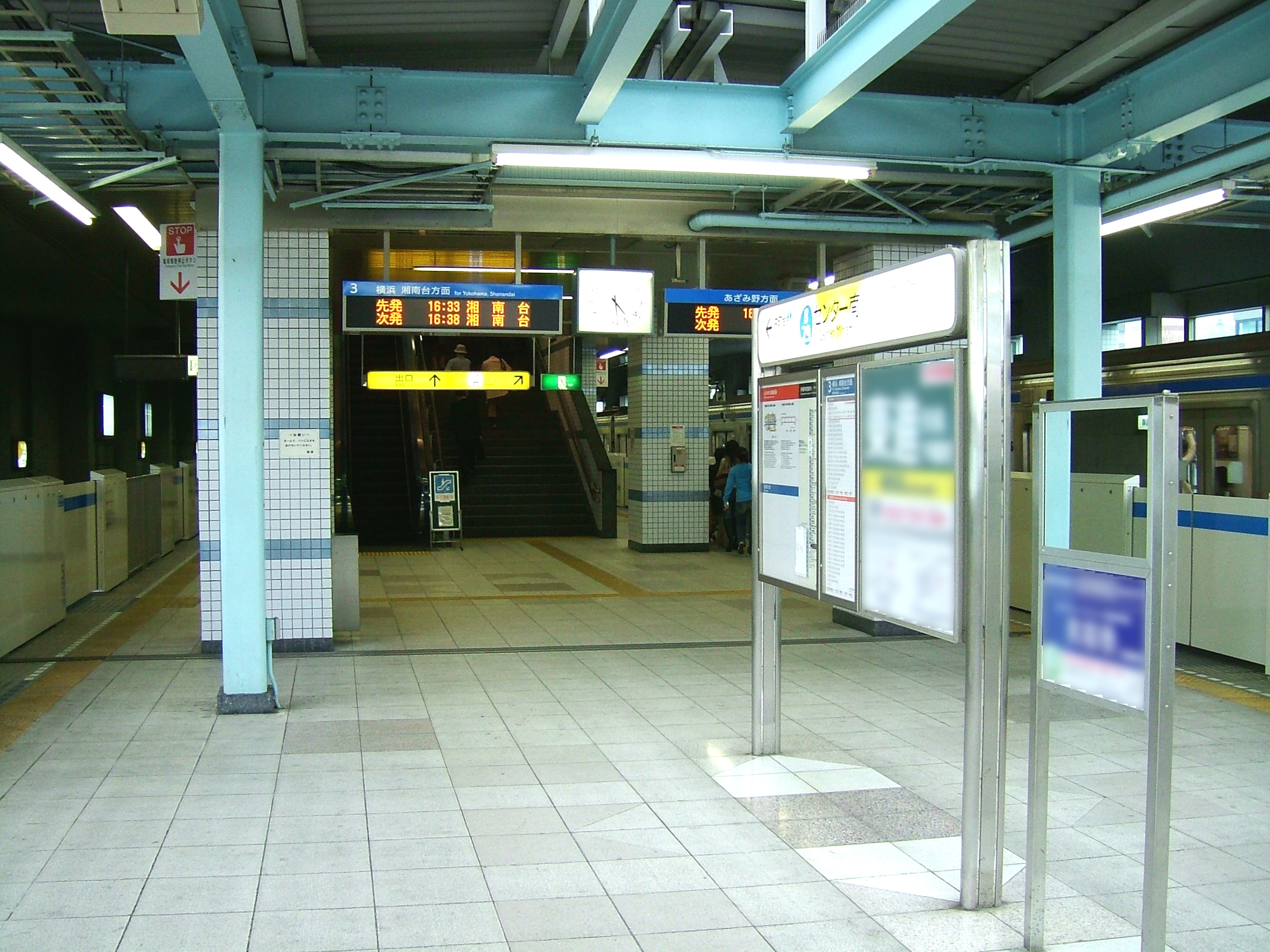
Blue Line platform

== History ==
Center-Minami Station opened on 18 March 1993, when the Line 3 (later named the Blue Line) was extended from Shin-Yokohama Station to Azamino Station. Platform screen doors were installed in April 2007. Services on the Green Line started on 30 March 2008.

== Surrounding area ==
=== Exit 1 (South Side) ===
- Tsuzuki Ward Office
  - Yokohama City Tsuzuki Library
- Tokyu Department Store

=== Exit 5 (North Side) ===
- Bus Terminal
- Showa University Hospital
- Tsuzuki Chuo Park (Tsuzuki Central Park)

=== Exit 7 ===
- Yokohama City Center Minami Passport Center

== See also ==
- List of railway stations in Japan
