= Nakayama Station (Kanagawa) =

Railway and metro station in Yokohama, Japan

JH19 G01 Nakayama Station 中山駅
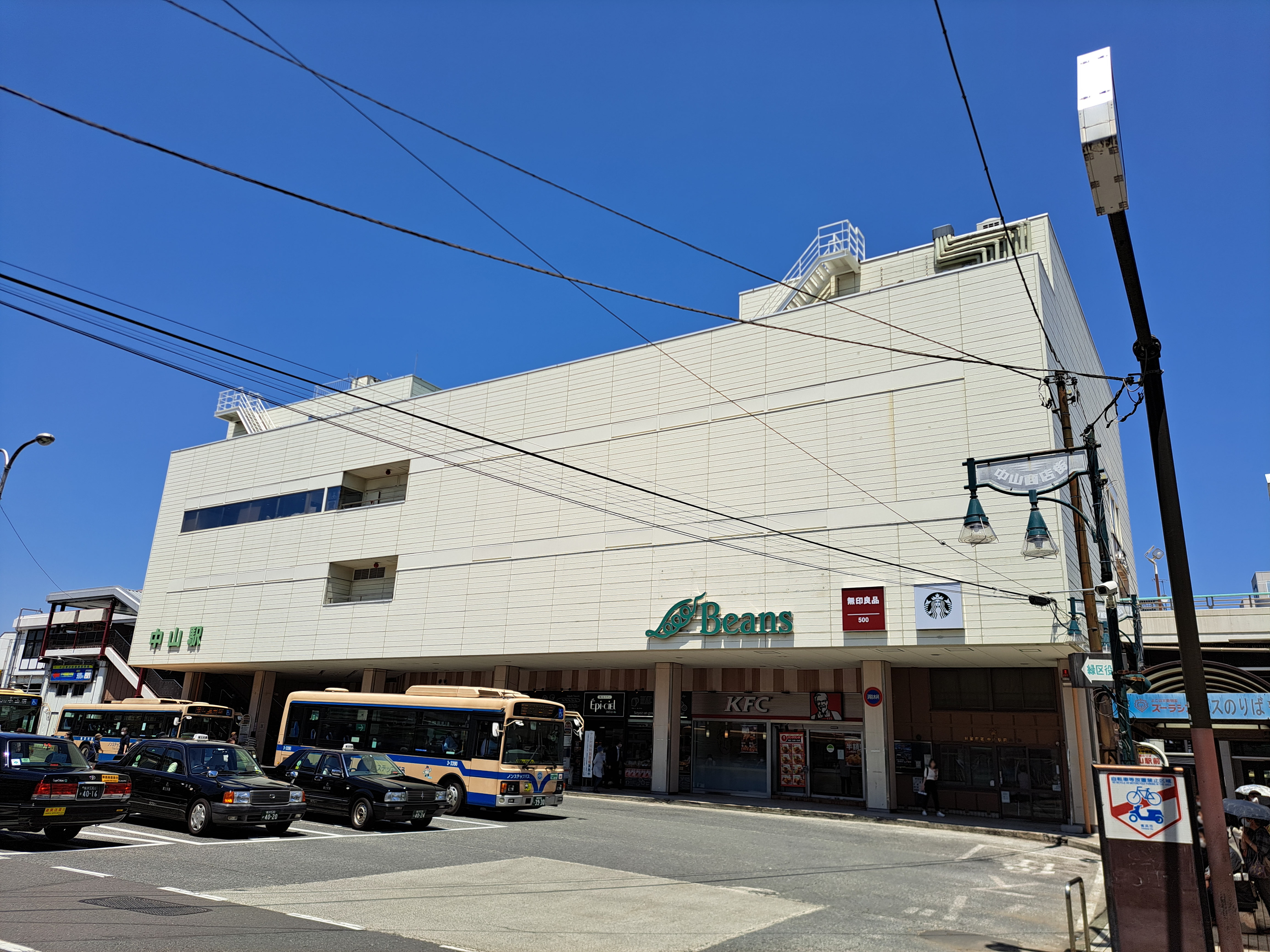
- Nakayama Station South Exit, May 2023

General information
- Location: 80 Terayama-cho Midori-ku, Yokohama-shi, Kanagawa-ken 226-0013; Japan
- Coordinates: 35.514832°N 139.540250°E
- Operator: JR East; Yokohama Municipal Subway
- Lines: Yokohama Line; Green Line
- Platforms: 5 (1 side platform and 2 island platforms)
- Connections: Bus stop

Other information
- Status: Staffed (Midori no Madoguchi)
- Station code: JH19, G01
- Website: Official website

History
- Opened: 23 September 1908; 117 years ago

Passengers
- FY2019: 41,986 (JR); 15,383 (Green Line) daily

Services
Preceding station	JR East	Following station
Nagatsuta JH21 towards Hachiōji	Yokohama Line Rapid	Kamoi JH18 towards Higashi-Kanagawa or Ōfuna
Tōkaichiba JH20 towards Hachiōji	Yokohama Line Local	Kamoi JH18 towards Higashi-Kanagawa or Ōfuna
Preceding station	Yokohama Municipal Subway	Following station
Terminus	Green Line	Kawawachō G02 towards Hiyoshi
Location
- Location within Yokohama Location within Kanagawa Prefecture Location within Japan

Nakayama Station (中山駅, Nakayama-eki) is an interchange railway station located in Midori-ku, Yokohama, Kanagawa Prefecture, Japan, jointly operated by the East Japan Railway Company (JR East) and the Yokohama Municipal Subway.

== Lines ==
Nakayama Station is served by the Yokohama Line from Higashi-Kanagawa to Hachiōji, and is 13.5 km from the official starting point of the line at Higashi-Kanagawa. Many services continue west of Higashi-Kanagawa via the Negishi Line to Sakuragicho during the offpeak, and to Ōfuna during the morning peak. It is also the terminus of the 13.0 km Yokohama Municipal Subway Green Line to Hiyoshi.

== Station layout ==
JR East station has a single side platform and an island platform serving three tracks. It has a Midori no Madoguchi staffed ticket office. The Yokohama Green Line subway station has a single island platform serving two underground tracks.

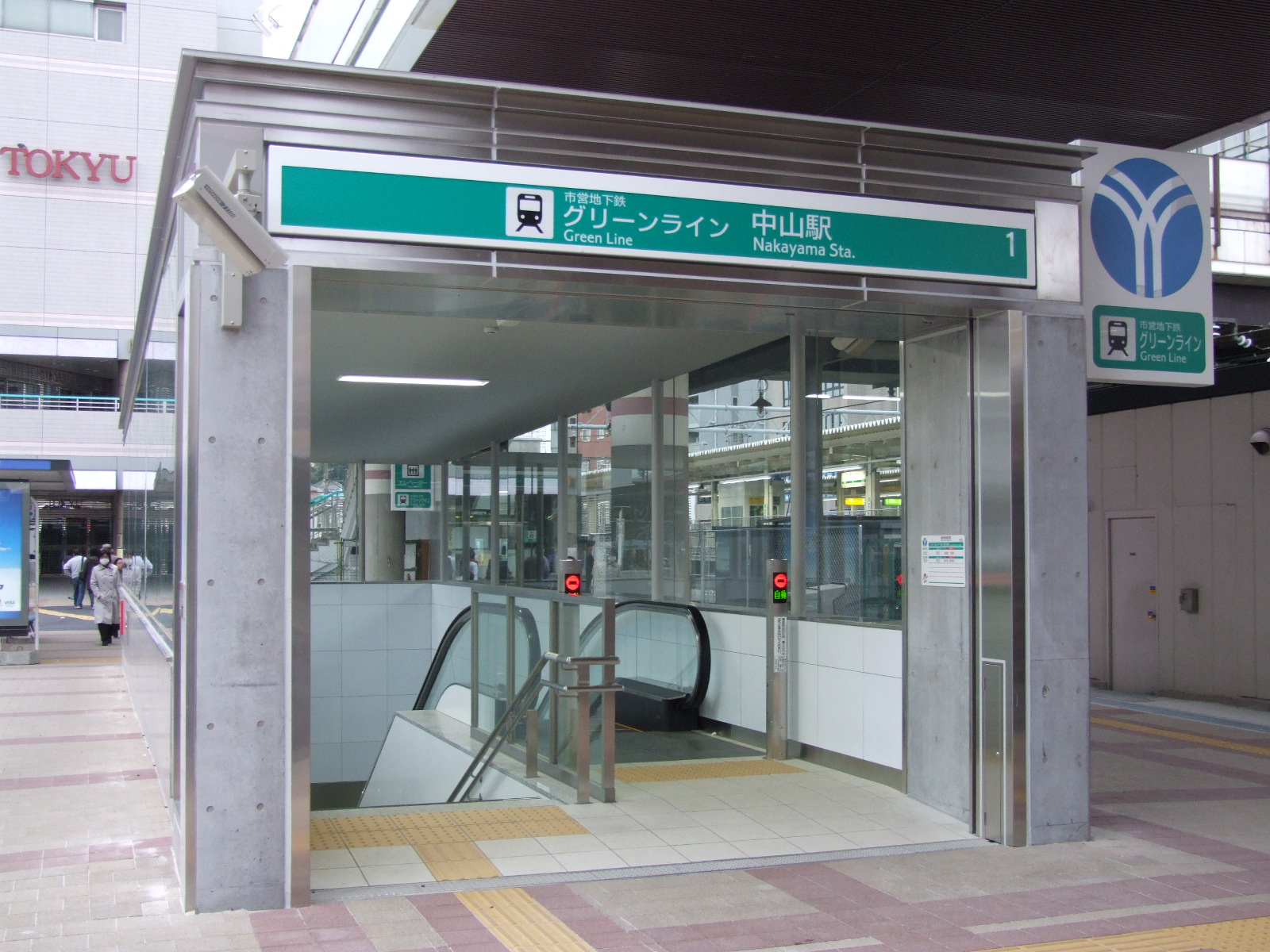
Yokohama Subway entrance, March 2008

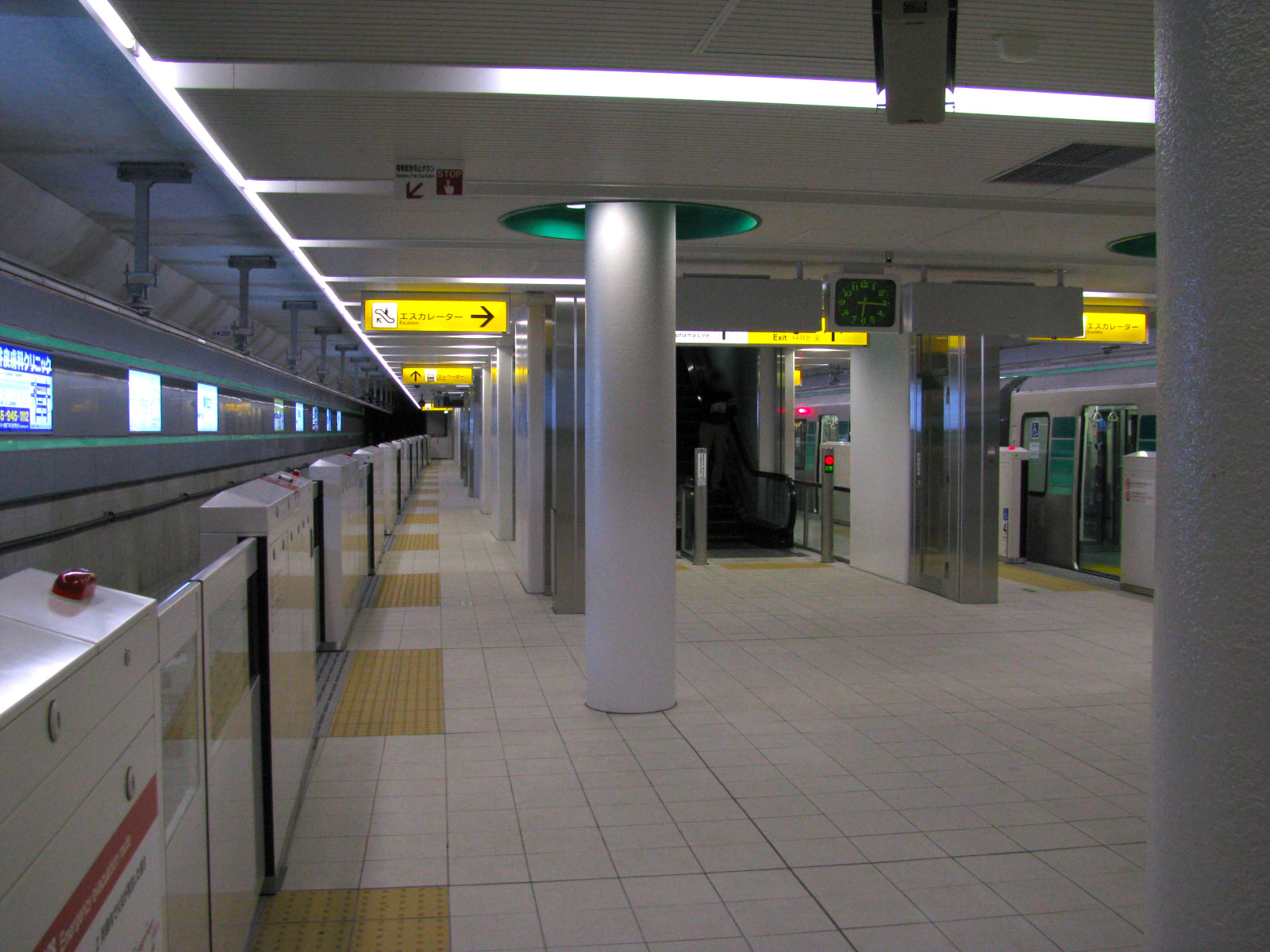
Yokohama Subway platforms, March 2008

=== JR East platforms ===
1	Yokohama Line	for Machida, Hashimoto and Hachioji
2,3	Yokohama Line	for Higashi-Kanagawa, Yokohama, Sakuragicho, and Ōfuna

=== Yokohama Municipal Subway platforms ===
1/2	■ Green Line	for Center-Minami and Hiyoshi

== History ==
Nakayama Station opened on 23 September 1908. A new station building was completed in 1985. With the privatization of JNR on 1 April 1987, the station came under the operational control of JR East. It became an interchange station with the Green Line on 30 March 2008.

Station numbering was introduced to the Yokohama Line on 20 August 2016 with Nakayama being assigned station number JH19.

== Accidents ==
On 20 January 2006, a 60-year-old man was killed by a train at the station after jumping from the platform onto the tracks to commit suicide.

On 1 October 2013, a 40-year-old woman, Natsue Murata (村田 奈津恵), was hit and killed by a train while trying to assist a 74-year-old-man who was spotted lying on the level crossing immediately to the east of the station. The man survived with injuries. On 4 October, the Government announced that it would award the Medal with Red Ribbon (紅綬褒章) to Murata posthumously for demonstrating extraordinary courage in saving another person's life.

== Passenger statistics ==
In fiscal 2019, the JR station was used by an average of 41,986 passengers daily (boarding passengers only). During the same period, the Yokohama Municipal Subway by an average of 15,383 passengers daily, (boarding passengers only).

The daily average passenger figures (boarding passengers only) for previous years are as shown below.

Fiscal year	JR East	Green Line
2005	31,529	NA
2010	37,302	11,158
2015	41,168	14,449

== Surrounding area ==
- Midori Ward Office
- Yokohama College of Commerce Midori Campus
- Yokohama Zoological Gardens ("Zoorasia")
