= List of Yokohama Municipal Subway station =

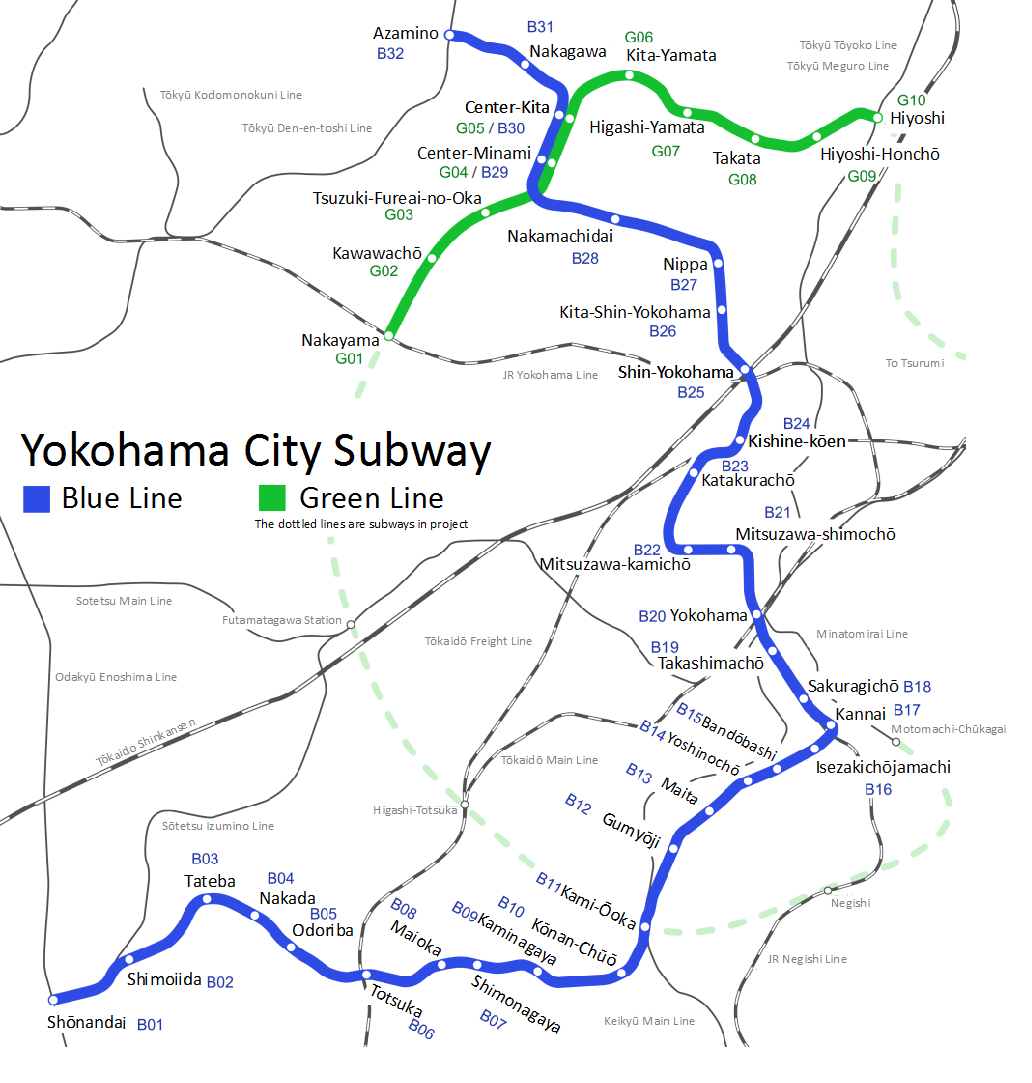
Yokohama Municipal Subway network map

There are currently 40 stations on the Yokohama Municipal Subway network operated by the Yokohama City Transportation Bureau. The first section to open was the Blue Line (Line 1), which began operation in December 1972 between Kami-Ooka Station and Isezaki-chojamachi Station. As of 2025, the network extends 53.4 km (33.2 mi) and serves 16 wards in the city of Yokohama, excluding Seya and Sakae. The Shonandai Station, located in Fujisawa, Kanagawa is the only station belonging in the network outside of Yokohama.

== Stations ==
=== Blue Line ===
No.	Station	Japanese	Photo	Transfers	Location
B32	Azamino	あざみ野		Tokyu Den-en-toshi Line (DT16)	Aoba-ku, Yokohama
B31	Nakagawa	中川			Tsuzuki-ku, Yokohama
B30	Center Kita	センター北		Green Line (Line 4, G05)	Tsuzuki-ku, Yokohama
B29	Center Minami	センター南		Green Line (Line 4, G04)	Tsuzuki-ku, Yokohama
B28	Nakamachidai	仲町台			Tsuzuki-ku, Yokohama
B27	Nippa	新羽			Kōhoku-ku, Yokohama
B26	Kita Shin-Yokohama	北新横浜			Kōhoku-ku, Yokohama
B25	Shin-Yokohama	新横浜		Tokaido Shinkansen; Yokohama Line (JH16); Tōkyū Shin-Yokohama Line (SH01); Sōtetsu Shin-Yokohama Line (SO52)	Kōhoku-ku, Yokohama
B24	Kishine-kōen	岸根公園			Kōhoku-ku, Yokohama
B23	Katakurachō	片倉町			Kanagawa-ku, Yokohama
B22	Mitsuzawa-kamichō	三ツ沢上町			Kanagawa-ku, Yokohama
B21	Mitsuzawa-shimochō	三ツ沢下町			Kanagawa-ku, Yokohama
B20	Yokohama	横浜		Tokaido Main Line (JT05); Yokosuka Line (JO13); Keihin-Tohoku Line (JK12); Yokohama Line (JK12); Negishi Line (JK12); Keikyu Main Line (KK37); Tokyu Toyoko Line (TY21); Sagami Railway Main Line (SO01); Minatomirai Line (MM01)	Nishi-ku, Yokohama
B19	Takashimachō	高島町			Nishi-ku, Yokohama
B18	Sakuragichō	桜木町		Negishi Line (JK11)	Naka-ku, Yokohama
B17	Kannai	関内		Negishi Line (JK10)	Naka-ku, Yokohama
B16	Isezakichōjamachi	伊勢佐木長者町			Naka-ku, Yokohama
B15	Bandōbashi	阪東橋			Naka-ku, Yokohama
B14	Yoshinochō	吉野町			Minami-ku, Yokohama
B13	Maita	蒔田			Minami-ku, Yokohama
B12	Gumyōji	弘明寺			Minami-ku, Yokohama
B11	Kami-Ōoka	上大岡		Keikyu Main Line (KK44)	Kōnan-ku, Yokohama
B10	Kōnan-Chūō	港南中央			Kōnan-ku, Yokohama
B09	Kaminagaya	上永谷			Kōnan-ku, Yokohama
B08	Shimonagaya	下永谷			Kōnan-ku, Yokohama
B07	Maioka	舞岡			Totsuka-ku, Yokohama
B06	Totsuka	戸塚		Tokaido Main Line (JT06); Yokosuka Line (JO10); Shonan-Shinjuku Line (JS10)	Totsuka-ku, Yokohama
B05	Odoriba	踊場			Izumi-ku, Yokohama
B04	Nakada	中田			Izumi-ku, Yokohama
B03	Tateba	立場			Izumi-ku, Yokohama
B02	Shimoiida	下飯田			Izumi-ku, Yokohama
B01	Shōnandai	湘南台		Odakyu Enoshima Line (OE09); Sagami Railway Izumino Line (SO37)	Fujisawa, Kanagawa

=== Green Line ===
No.	Station	Japanese	Photo	Transfers	Location (in Yokohama)
G01	Nakayama	中山		Yokohama Line	Midori-ku
G02	Kawawachō	川和町			Tsuzuki-ku
G03	Tsuzuki-fureainooka	都筑ふれあいの丘			Tsuzuki-ku
G04	Center-Minami	センター南		Yokohama Municipal Subway Blue Line (Line 3, B29)	Tsuzuki-ku
G05	Center-Kita	センター北		Yokohama Municipal Subway Blue Line (Line 3, B30)	Tsuzuki-ku
G06	Kita-Yamata	北山田			Tsuzuki-ku
G07	Higashi-Yamata	東山田			Tsuzuki-ku
G08	Takata	高田			Kōhoku-ku
G09	Hiyoshi-Honchō	日吉本町			Kōhoku-ku
G10	Hiyoshi	日吉		Toyoko Line; Meguro Line; Tōkyū Shin-Yokohama Line	Kōhoku-ku
