= Shimonagaya Station =

Metro station in Yokohama, Japan

Coordinates: 35°24′09.64″N 139°33′33.80″E

B08 Shimonagaya Station 下永谷駅
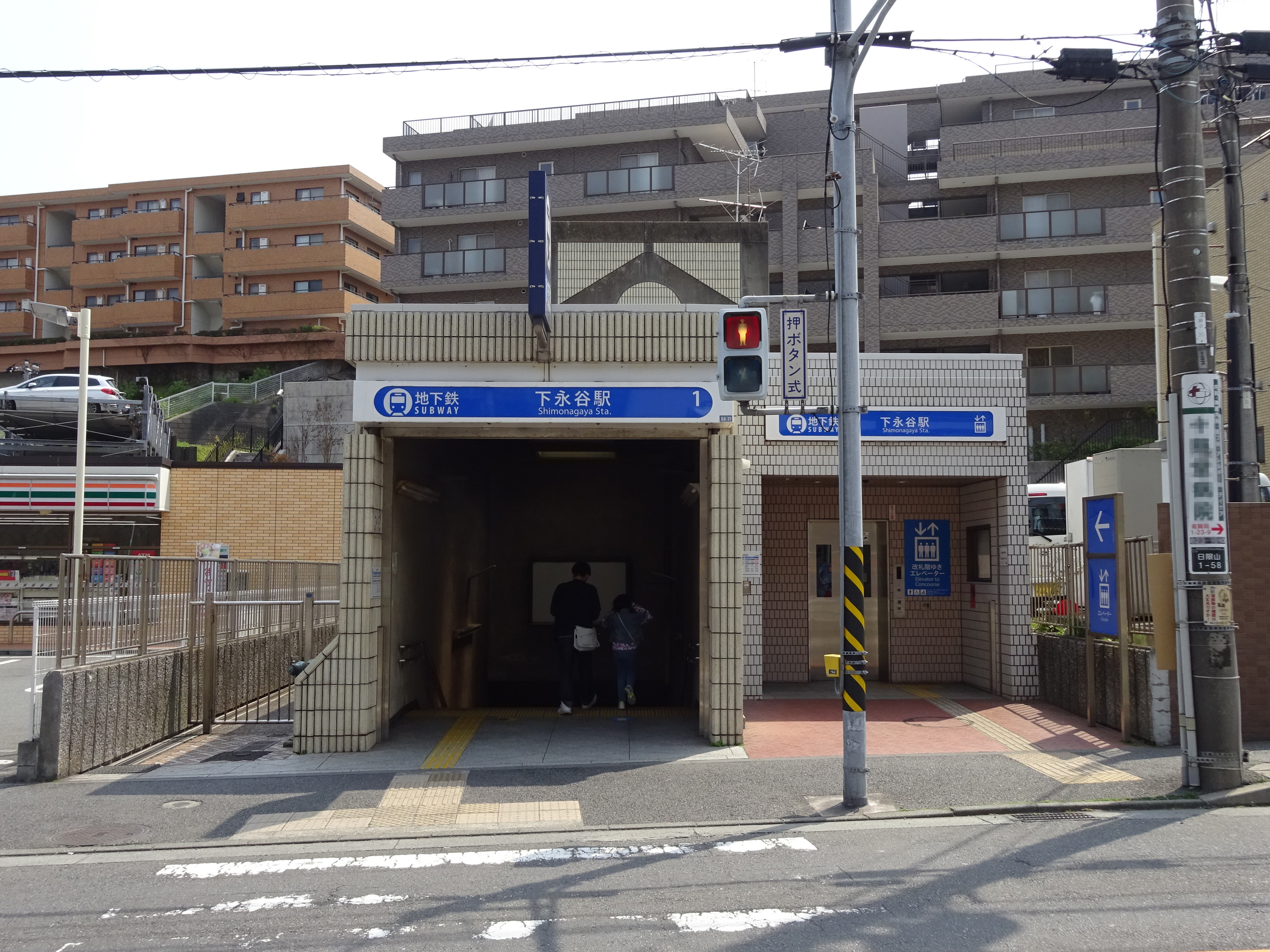
- Entrance No.1

General information
- Location: Higiriyama 1-58-27, Kōnan, Yokohama, Kanagawa （横浜市港南区日限山一丁目58-27） Japan
- System: Yokohama Municipal Subway station
- Operator: Yokohama City Transportation Bureau
- Line: Blue Line
- Platforms: 2 side platforms
- Tracks: 2

Other information
- Station code: B08

History
- Opened: 14 March 1985; 41 years ago

Passengers
- 2008: 5,700 daily

Services
Preceding station	Yokohama Municipal Subway	Following station
Maioka B07 towards Shonandai	Blue Line Local	Kaminagaya B09 towards Azamino
Location
- Location within Yokohama Location within Kanagawa Prefecture Location within Japan

Shimonagaya Station (下永谷駅, Shimonagaya-eki) is an underground metro station located in Kōnan-ku, Yokohama, Kanagawa, Japan operated by the Yokohama Municipal Subway’s Blue Line (Line 1). It is 9.7 kilometers from the terminus of the Blue Line at Shōnandai Station.

== Lines ==
- Yokohama Municipal Subway
  - Blue Line

== Station layout ==
Shimonagaya Station has a two opposed side platforms, located three stories underground.

=== Platforms ===
1	■ Blue Line (Yokohama)	Totsuka, Shōnandai
2	■ Blue Line (Yokohama)	Kamiōoka, Kannai, Yokohama, Azamino

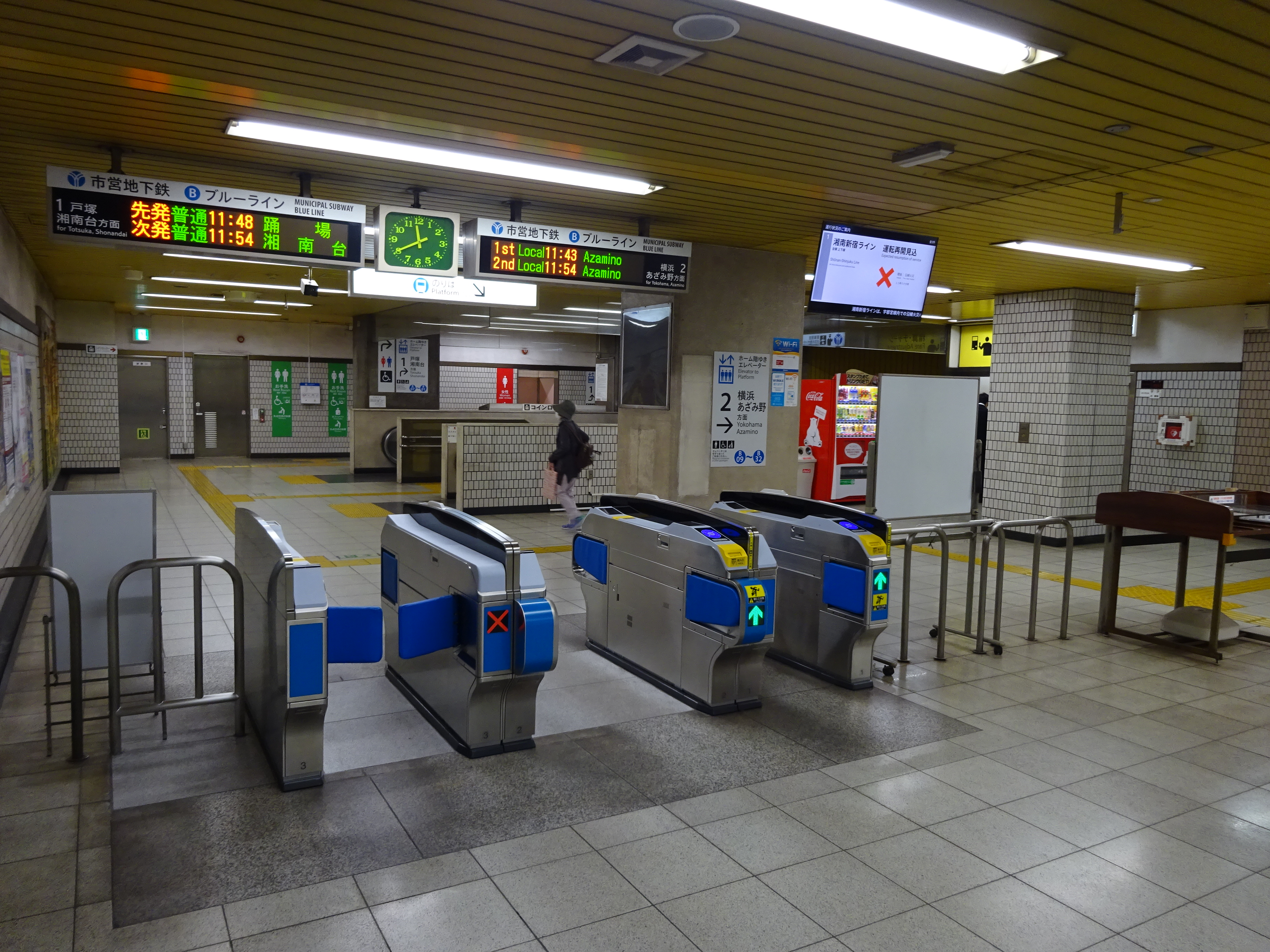
Ticket gates

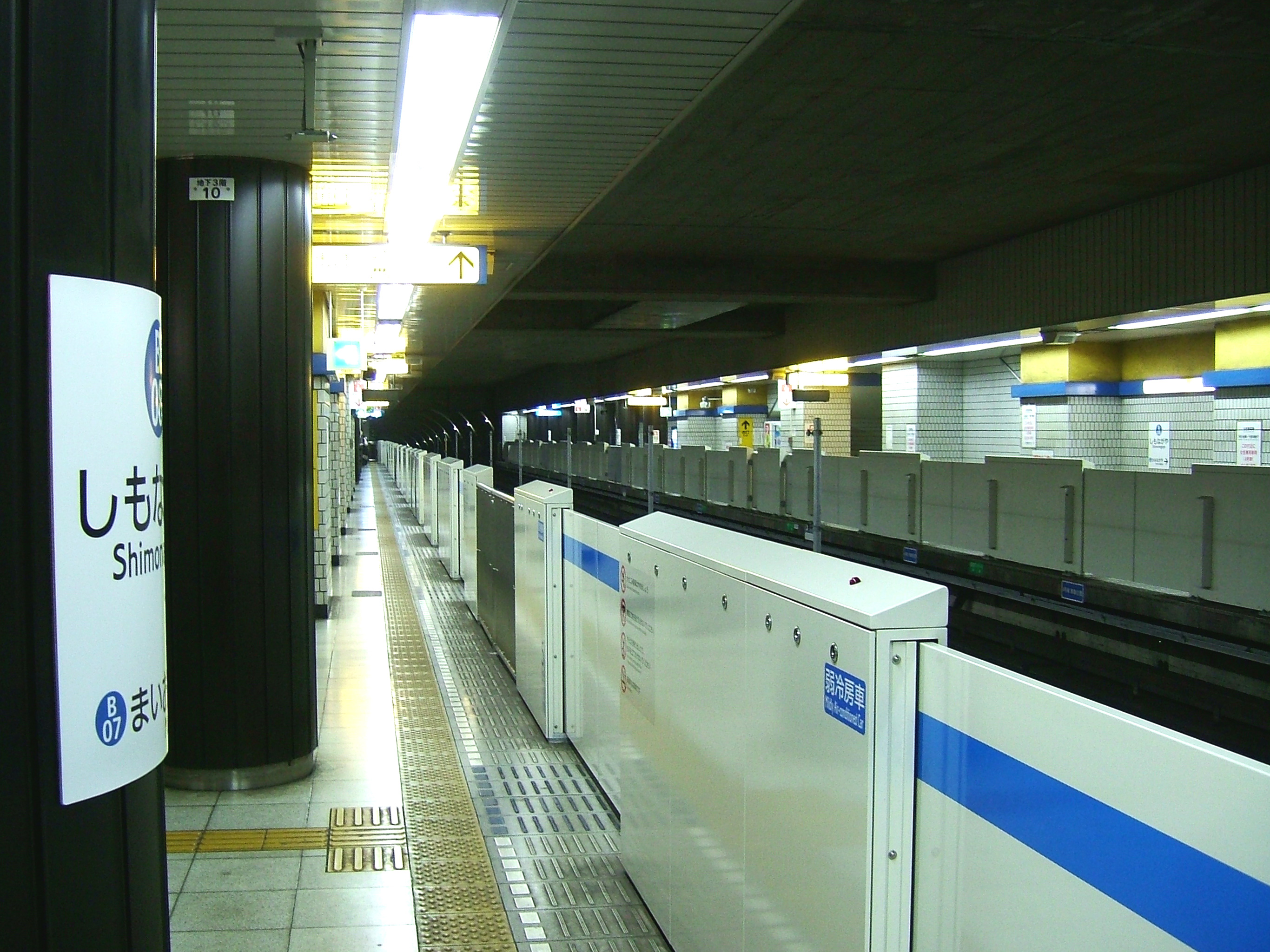
Platform

== History ==
Shimonagaya Station was opened on 14 March 1985. Platform screen doors were installed in September 2007.
