= Isezaki-chōjamachi Station =

Metro station in Yokohama, Japan

Coordinates: 35°26′27.76″N 139°37′59.43″E

B16 Isezaki-chōjamachi Station 伊勢佐木長者町駅
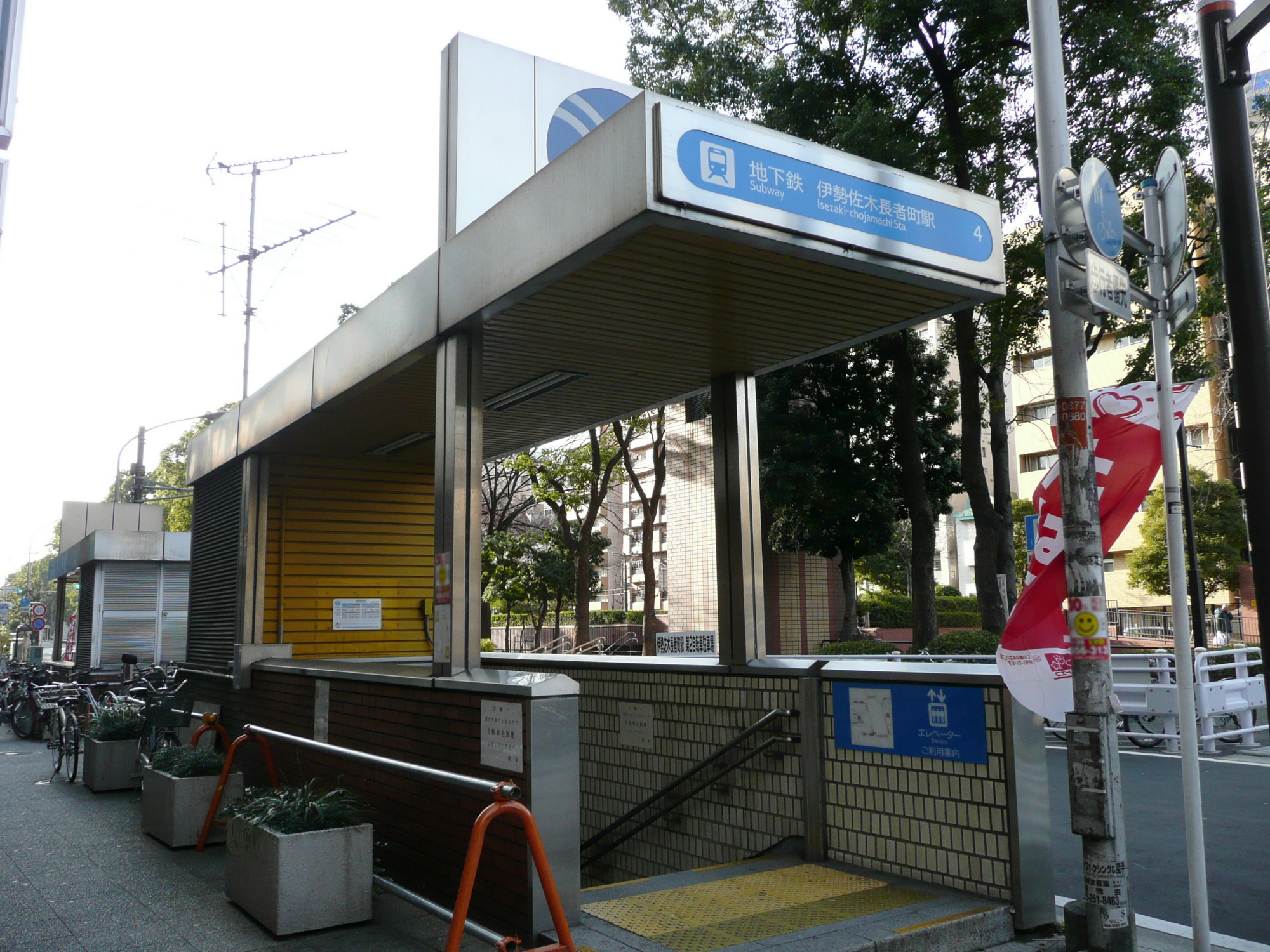
- Entrance No.4

General information
- Location: Chōja-machi 5-48, Naka, Yokohama, Kanagawa （横浜市中区長者町五丁目48） Japan
- System: Yokohama Municipal Subway station
- Operator: Yokohama City Transportation Bureau
- Line: Blue Line
- Platforms: 1 island platform
- Tracks: 2

Other information
- Station code: B16

History
- Opened: 16 December 1972; 53 years ago

Passengers
- 2008: 7,611 daily

Services
Preceding station	Yokohama Municipal Subway	Following station
Bandōbashi B15 towards Shonandai	Blue Line Local	Kannai B17 towards Azamino
Location
- Location within Yokohama Location within Kanagawa Prefecture Location within Japan

Isezaki-chōjamachi Station (伊勢佐木長者町駅, Isezaki-chōjamachi-eki) is an underground metro station located in Naka-ku, Yokohama, Kanagawa, Japan operated by the Yokohama Municipal Subway’s Blue Line (Line 1). It is 19.0 kilometers (11.8 mi) from the terminus of the Blue Line at Shōnandai Station.

== Lines ==
- Yokohama Municipal Subway
  - Blue Line

== Station layout ==
Isezaki-chōjamachi Station is an underground station with a single island platform serving two tracks.

=== Platforms ===
1	■ Blue Line (Yokohama)	Kamiōoka, Totsuka, Shōnandai
2	■ Blue Line (Yokohama)	Kannai, Yokohama, Shin-Yokohama, Azamino

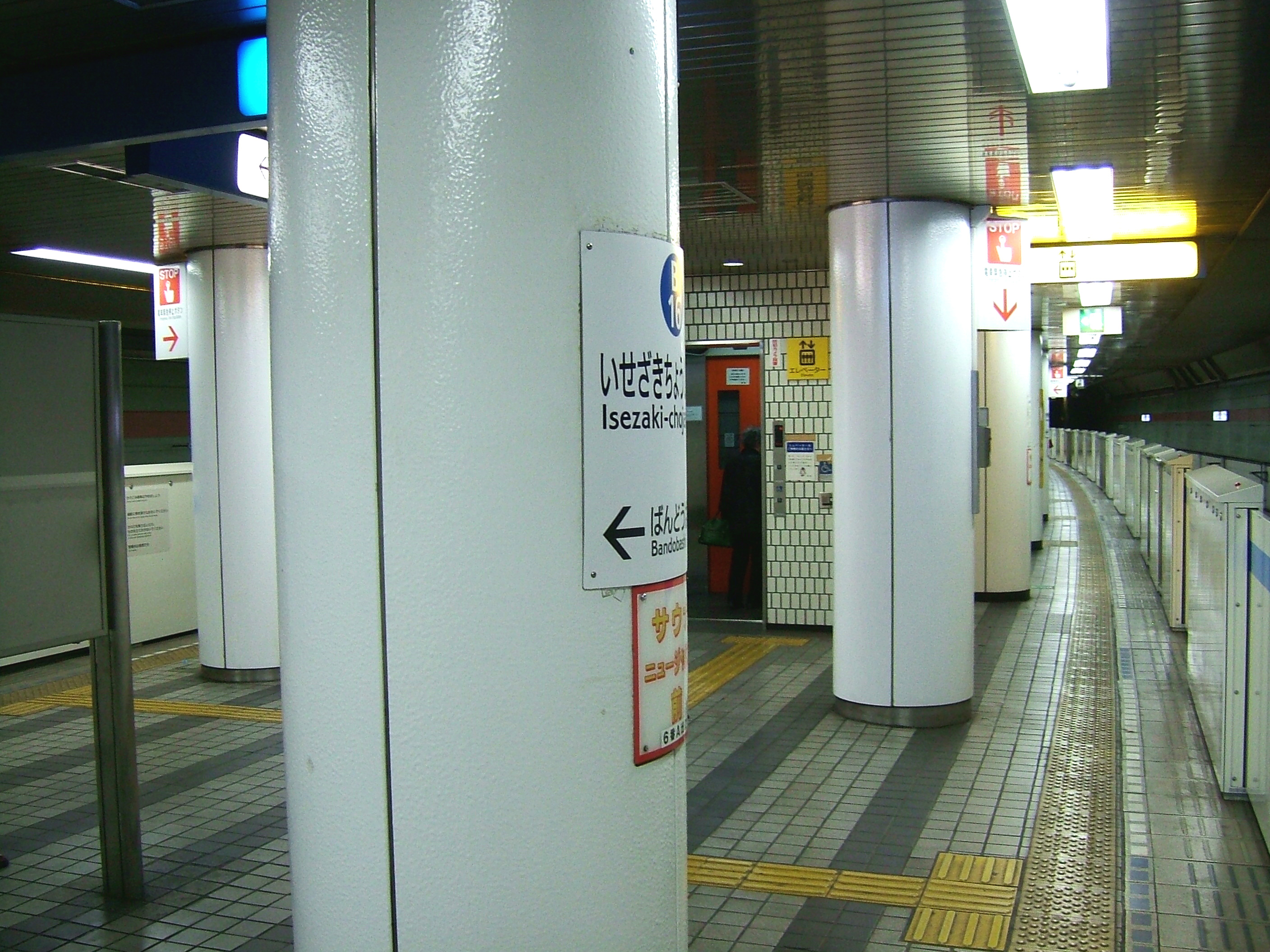
Platform

== History ==
Isezaki-chōjamachi Station was opened on 16 December 1972. Platform screen doors were installed in September 2007.
