= Yokohama Women's Junior College =

Private junior women's college in Konan-ku, Yokohama, Kanagawa Prefecture, Japan

Coordinates: 35°22′19″N 139°34′32″E

- 横浜女子短期大学; Yokohama joshi tanki daigaku
- Type: Private
- Established: 1979
- Location: Konan-ku, Yokohama, Kanagawa, Japan
- Website: Official website

Yokohama Women's Junior College (横浜女子短期大学, Yokohama joshi tanki daigaku) is a private junior women's college in Konan-ku, Yokohama, Kanagawa Prefecture, Japan.

The predecessor of the school was established in 1940 as a teachers school for kindergarten and nursery school children. It became a junior college in 1966 and relocated to its present location in 1979.
