= Kōnan-Chūō Station =

Metro station in Yokohama, Japan

Coordinates: 35°24′03.78″N 139°35′27.45″E

B10 Kōnan-Chūō Station 港南中央駅
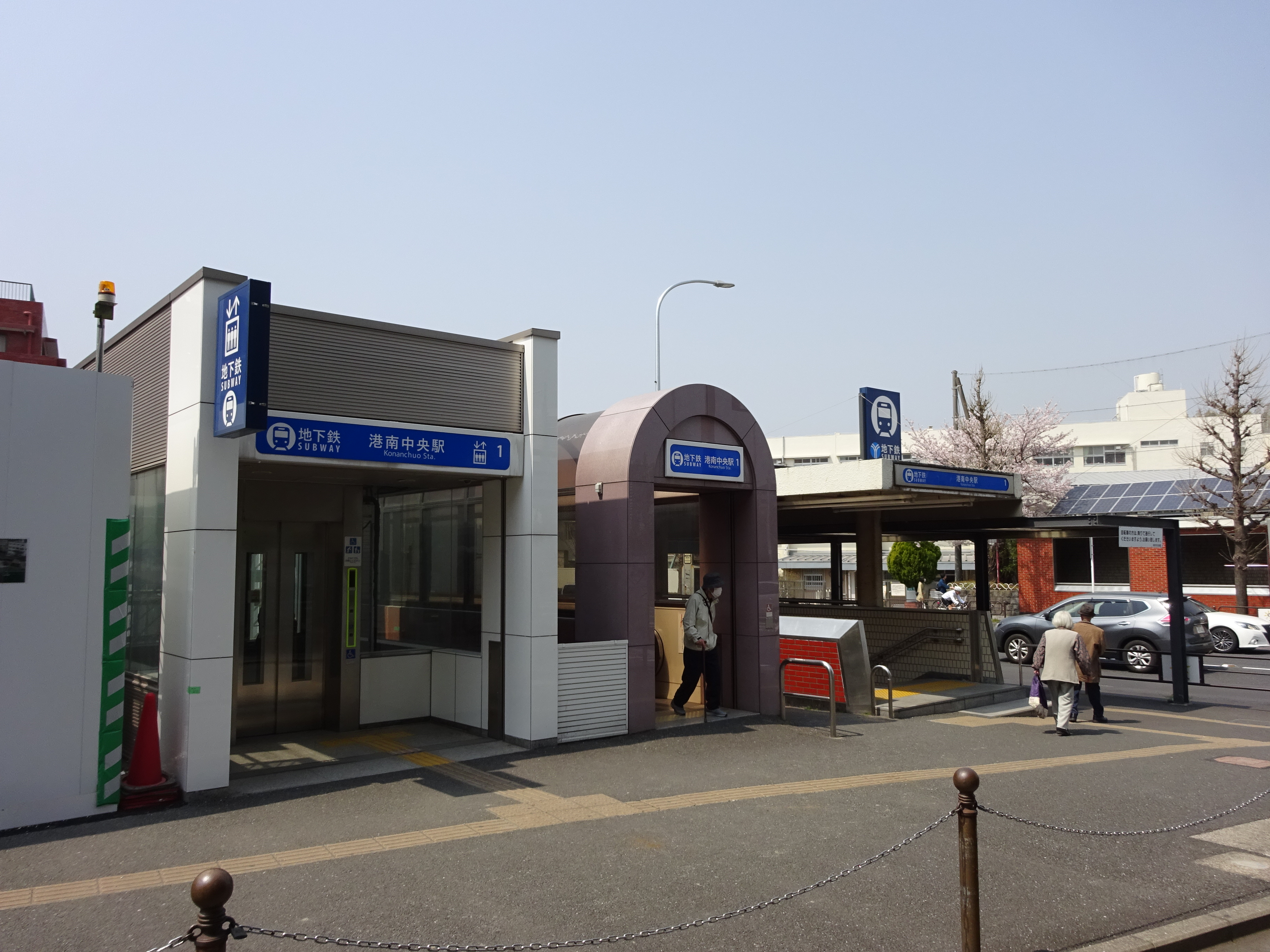
- Entrance No.1

General information
- Location: Kōnan-Chūō-dōri 10-B-1, Kōnan, Yokohama, Kanagawa （横浜市港南区港南中央通10-B-1） Japan
- System: Yokohama Municipal Subway station
- Operator: Yokohama City Transportation Bureau
- Line: Blue Line
- Platforms: 2 side platforms
- Tracks: 2

Other information
- Station code: B10

History
- Opened: September 4, 1976; 50 years ago

Passengers
- 2008: 8,452 daily

Services
| Preceding station | Yokohama Municipal Subway | Following station |
|---|---|---|
| Kaminagaya B09 towards Shonandai | Blue Line Local | Kamiōoka B11 towards Azamino |
Location
- Location within Yokohama Location within Kanagawa Prefecture Location within Japan

Kōnan-Chūō Station (港南中央駅, Kōnan-Chūō-eki) is an underground metro station located in Kōnan-ku, Yokohama, Kanagawa, Japan operated by the Yokohama Municipal Subway’s Blue Line (Line 1). It is 12.7 kilometers from the terminus of the Blue Line at Shōnandai Station.

== Lines ==
- Yokohama Municipal Subway
  - Blue Line

== Station layout ==
Kōnan-Chūō Station has two opposed side platforms serving two tracks. The platforms are on the second floor underground, with the exit gates and station building on the first floor underground.

=== Platforms ===
| 1 | ■ Blue Line (Yokohama) | Totsuka, Shōnandai |
| 2 | ■ Blue Line (Yokohama) | Kamiōoka, Kannai, Yokohama, Azamino |

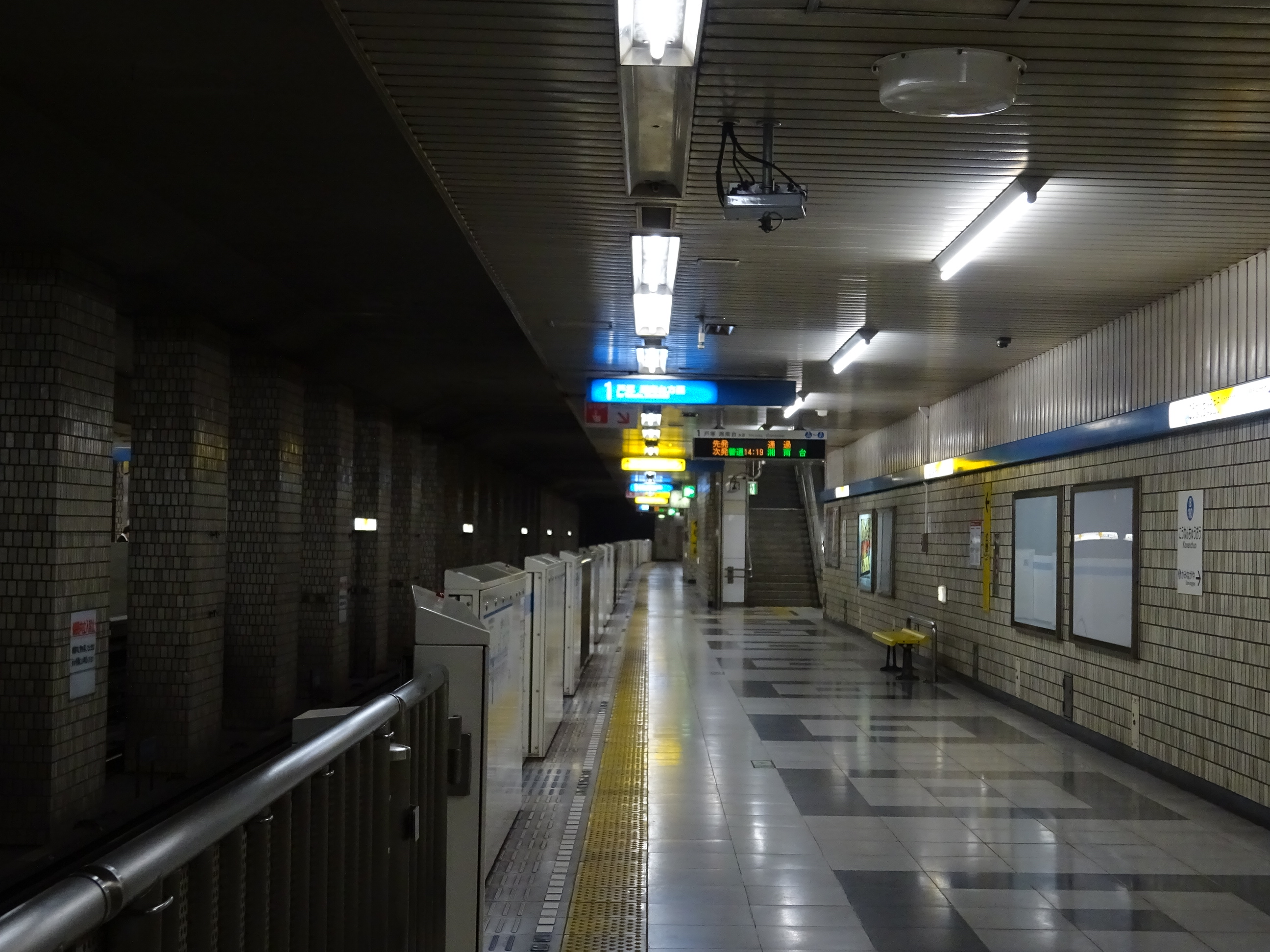
Platform

== History ==
Kōnan-Chūō Station was opened on 4 September 1976. Platform screen doors were installed in September 2007.
