= Kaminagaya Station =

Metro station in Yokohama, Japan

Coordinates: 35°24′5″N 139°34′21.5″E

B09 Kaminagaya Station 上永谷駅
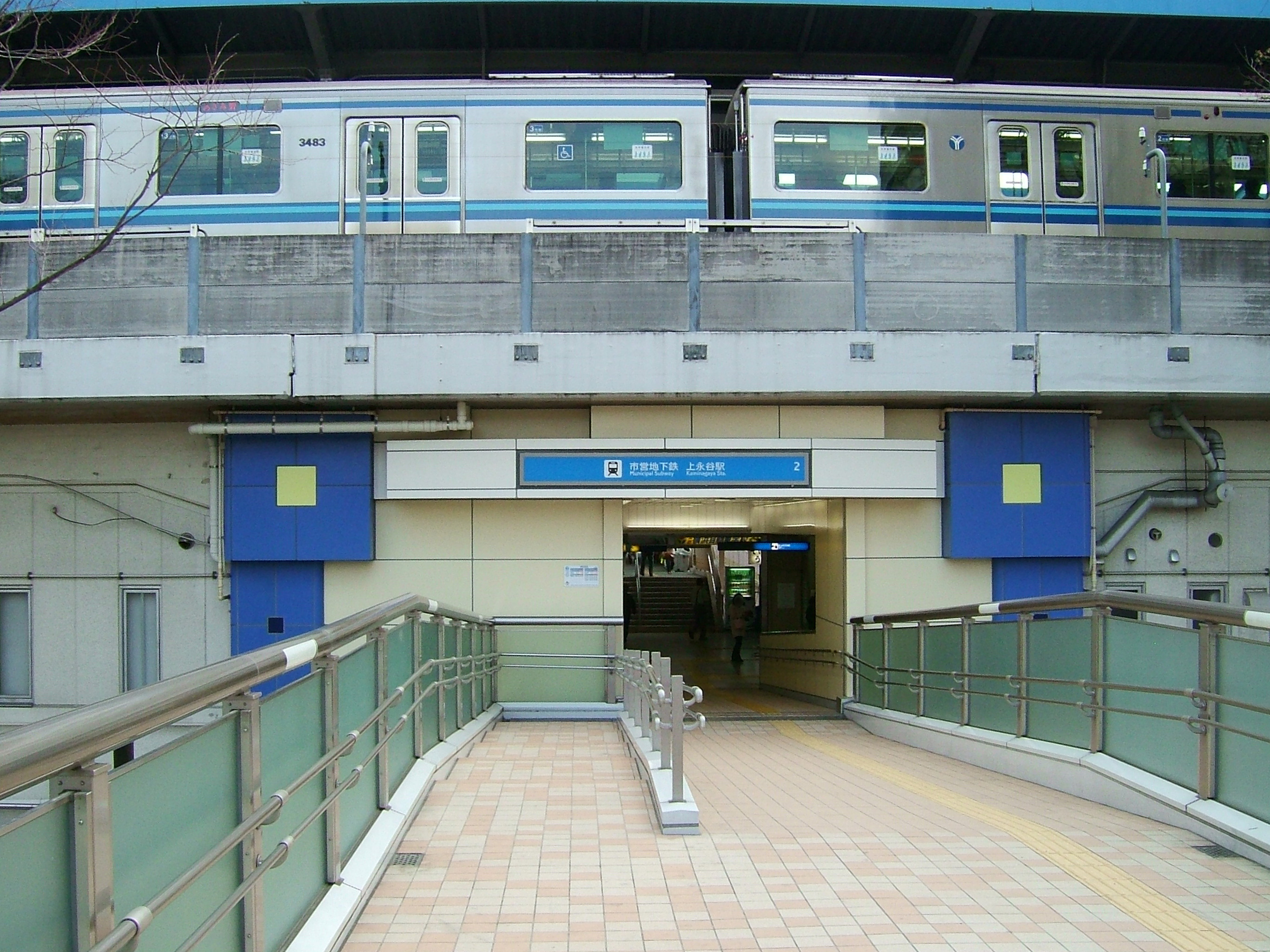
- Entrance No.2

General information
- Location: Maruyamadai 1-1-1, Kōnan, Yokohama, Kanagawa （横浜市港南区丸山台一丁目1-1） Japan
- System: Yokohama Municipal Subway station
- Operator: Yokohama City Transportation Bureau
- Line: Blue Line
- Platforms: 2 island platforms
- Tracks: 4

Other information
- Station code: B09

History
- Opened: September 4, 1976; 50 years ago

Passengers
- 2008: 18,783 daily

Services
Preceding station	Yokohama Municipal Subway	Following station
Totsuka B06 towards Shonandai	Blue Line Rapid	Kamiōoka B11 towards Azamino
Shimonagaya B08 towards Shonandai	Blue Line Local	Kōnan-Chūō B10 towards Azamino
Location
- Location within Yokohama Location within Kanagawa Prefecture Location within Japan

Kaminagaya Station (上永谷駅, Kaminagaya-eki) is an above-ground metro station located in Kōnan-ku, Yokohama, Kanagawa, Japan operated by the Yokohama Municipal Subway’s Blue Line (Line 1). It is 11.0 kilometers from the terminus of the Blue Line at Shōnandai Station.

== Lines ==
- Yokohama Municipal Subway
  - Blue Line

== Station layout ==
Kaminagaya Station is an elevated station with two above-ground island platforms serving four tracks. The platforms are on the third floor, with the exit gates and station building below.

=== Platforms ===
1	■ Blue Line (Yokohama)	Totsuka, Shōnandai
2	■ Blue Line (Yokohama)	Totsuka, Shōnandai
3	■ Blue Line (Yokohama)	Kamiōoka, Kannai, Yokohama, Azamino
4	■ Blue Line (Yokohama)	Kamiōoka, Kannai, Yokohama, Azamino

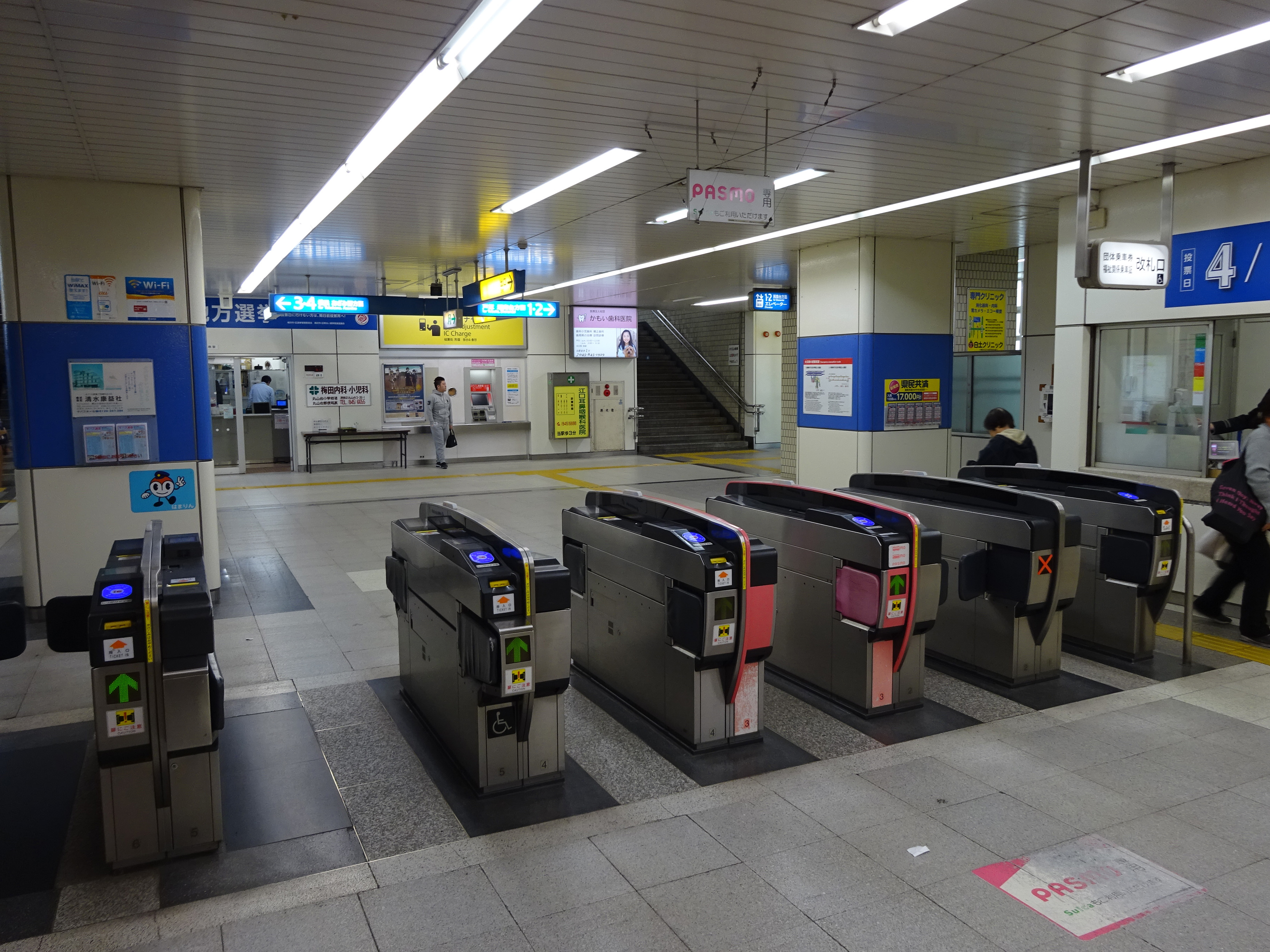
Ticket gates

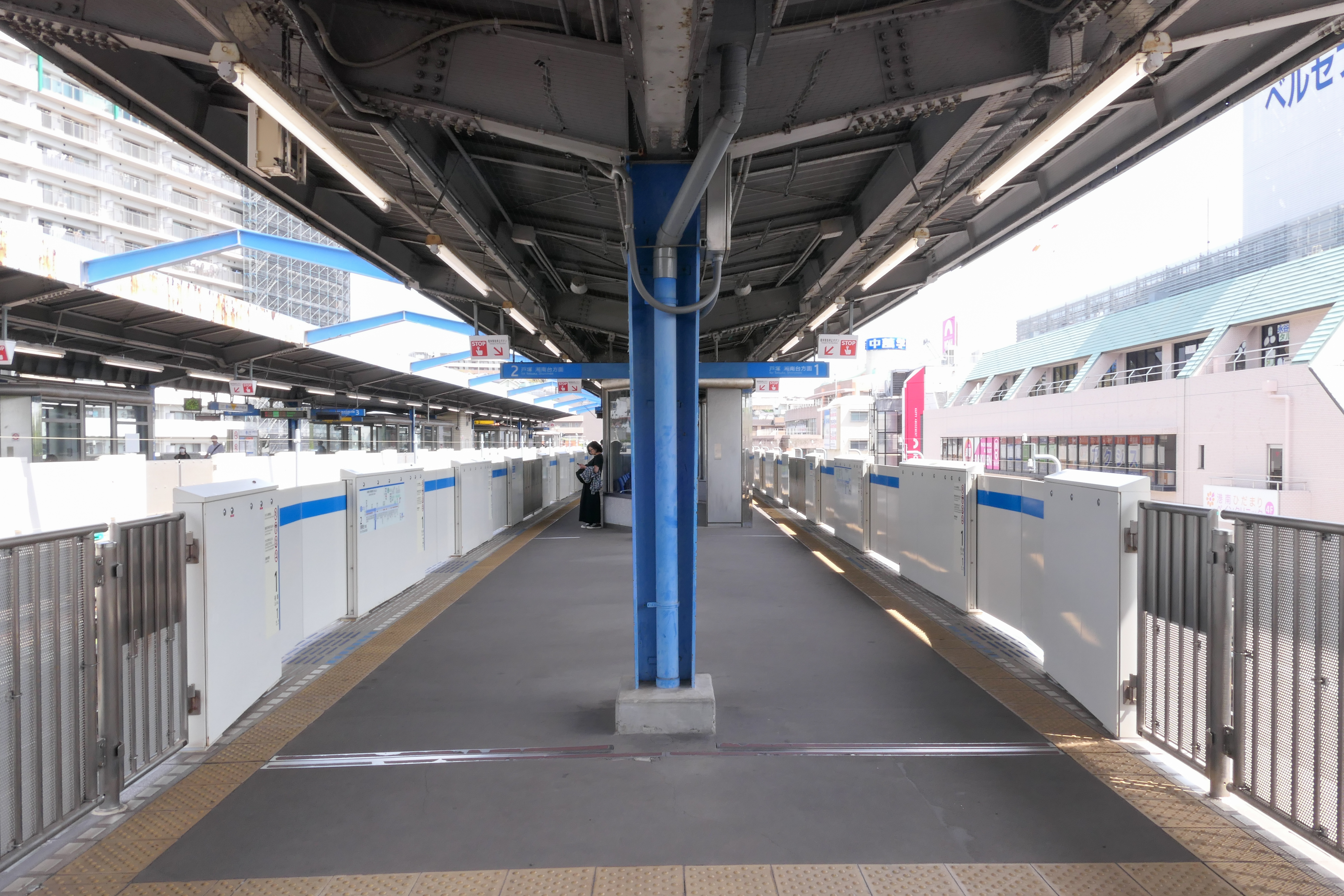
Platform

== History ==
Kaminagaya Station was opened on 4 September 1976, initially as a terminal station on the Blue Line. The line was extended to Maioka Station on 14 March 1985. Platform screen doors were installed in September 2007.
