= Kōnan-ku, Yokohama =

Kōnan 港南区
- Ward
- Kōnan Ward
- Flag

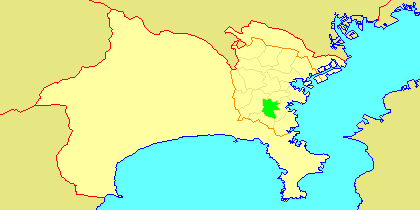
- Location of Kōnan in Kanagawa
- Interactive map of Kōnan
- Kōnan (Japan)
- Coordinates: 35°24′2″N 139°35′29″E
- Country: Japan
- Region: Kantō
- Prefecture: Kanagawa
- City: Yokohama

Area
  - Total: 19.87 km^{2} (7.67 sq mi)

Population (February 2010)
  - Total: 221,536
  - Density: 11,500/km^{2} (30,000/sq mi)
- Time zone: UTC+9 (Japan Standard Time)
- Symbols
  - Tree: Holly
  - Flower: Sunflower, Chinese bellflower, and hydrangea
  - Bird: Great tit
- Phone number: 045-847-8484
- Address: Kōnan-chūō-dōri 10-1, Kōnan-ku Yokohama-shi, Kanagawa-ken; 233-0004
- Website: Kōnan Ward Office

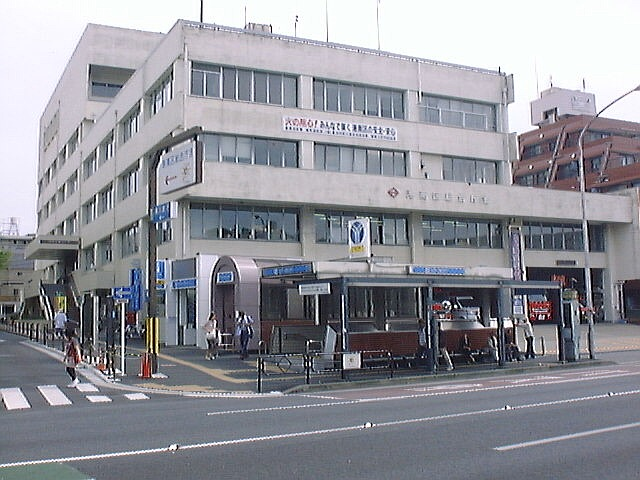
Kōnan Ward Office

Kōnan-ku (港南区) is one of the 18 wards of the city of Yokohama in Kanagawa Prefecture, Japan. As of 2010, the ward had an estimated population of 221,536 and a density of 11,150 persons per km^{2}. The total area was 19.87 km^{2}. Located in the southeastern part of Yokohama, Kōnan serves as both a regional commercial hub and a residential area for commuters working in central Yokohama and Tokyo. Kōnan is known for its urban development and green residential neighborhoods, and good transportation infrastructure.

== Geography ==
Kōnan is located in eastern Kanagawa Prefecture, and south of the geographic center of the city of Yokohama.

=== Surrounding municipalities ===
- Minami Ward
- Isogo Ward
- Sakae Ward
- Totsuka Ward

== History ==
The area around present-day Kōnan Ward was part of Kuraki District in Musashi Province until the end of the Edo period, and was tenryō territory controlled directly by the Tokugawa shogunate, but administered through various hatamoto.

After the Meiji Restoration, the area was transferred to the new Kanagawa Prefecture, and during the cadastral reform of April 1, 1889, Kamiooka village and several other villages were established. On October 1, 1927, the area was annexed by the neighboring city of Yokohama, becoming part of Naka Ward. The Shōnan Electric Railway, the predecessor to the Keikyū Main Line began operations from April 1, 1935, leading to the rapid urbanization of the area. In a major administrative reorganization of October 1, 1969, Kōnan was separated from Naka Ward, and became an independent Ward within Yokohama. The population exceeded 100,000 in ay 1970, and 200,000 in June 1984.

== Economy ==
Kōnan Ward is largely a regional commercial center and bedroom community for central Yokohama and Tokyo.

== Transportation ==
=== Railroads ===
- Keihin Electric Express Railway-Keikyū Main Line
  - Kami-Ōoka
- JR East - Negishi Line
  - Kōnandai Station
- Yokohama City Transportation Bureau – Blue Line
  - Kami-Ōoka – Kōnan-Chūō – Kaminagaya – Shimonagaya

=== Highways ===
- Route 16

== Education ==
College:

- Yokohama Women's Junior College

Prefectural high schools are operated by the Kanagawa Prefectural Board of Education. Prefectural senior high schools:

- Nagaya High School
- Yokohama Meihō High School
- Yokohama Nanryō High School

Municipal junior-senior high schools are operated by the Yokohama Municipal Board of Education.

- Minami High School - Includes a senior high school and an attached junior high school.

Private high schools:

- Kashima Gakuen High School (Kōnandai campus)

The municipal board of education also operates public elementary and junior high schools.

Municipal junior high schools:

- Higashinagaya (東永谷)
- Higiriyama (日限山)
- Hino-minami (日野南)
- Kaminagaya (上永谷)
- Kōnan (港南)
- Kōnandai-Dai-ichi (No. 1) (港南台第一)
- Maruyamadai (丸山台)
- Sasage (笹下)
- Serigaya (芹が谷)
- JHS Attached to Minami HS (南高等学校附属)

Former junior high schools:

- Noba (野庭) - Closed in 2020.

Elementary schools:

- Higiriyama (日限山)
- Hino (日野)
- Hino-minami (日野南)
- Hishita (日下)
- Kami-Ōoka (上大岡)
- Kōnandai-Dai-ichi (No. 1) (港南台第一)
- Kōnandai-Daini (No. 2) (港南台第二)
- Kōnandai-Daisan (No. 3) (港南台第三)
- Kotsubo (小坪)
- Maruyamadai (丸山台)
- Minamidai (南台)
- Nagano (永野)
- Nagaya (永谷)
- Noba-Suzukake (野庭すずかけ)
- Sakuraoka (桜岡)
- Serigaya (芹が谷)
- Serigaya-minami (芹が谷南)
- Shimonagaya (下永谷)
- Shimonoba (下野庭)
- Sōbuyama (相武山)
- Yoshihara (吉原)

Additionally, Fujinoki Elementary School (藤の木小学校), Shiomidai Elementary School (汐見台小学校), and Yōkōdai-Daisan (No. 3) Elementary School (洋光台第三小学校), outside of Konan-ku, have attendance zones including parts of Konan-ku.

== Noted people from Kōnan ==
- Akiko Fukushima, professional golfer
- Reiko Takashima, actress
- Daisuke Sakata, professional football player
- Max Matsuura, record producer
- Kouhei Kadono, author
- Hironori Kusano, idol singer
- Jackie Sato, professional wrestler
