= Maioka Station =

Metro station in Yokohama, Japan

Coordinates: 35°24′9″N 139°33′4″E

B07 Maioka Station 舞岡駅
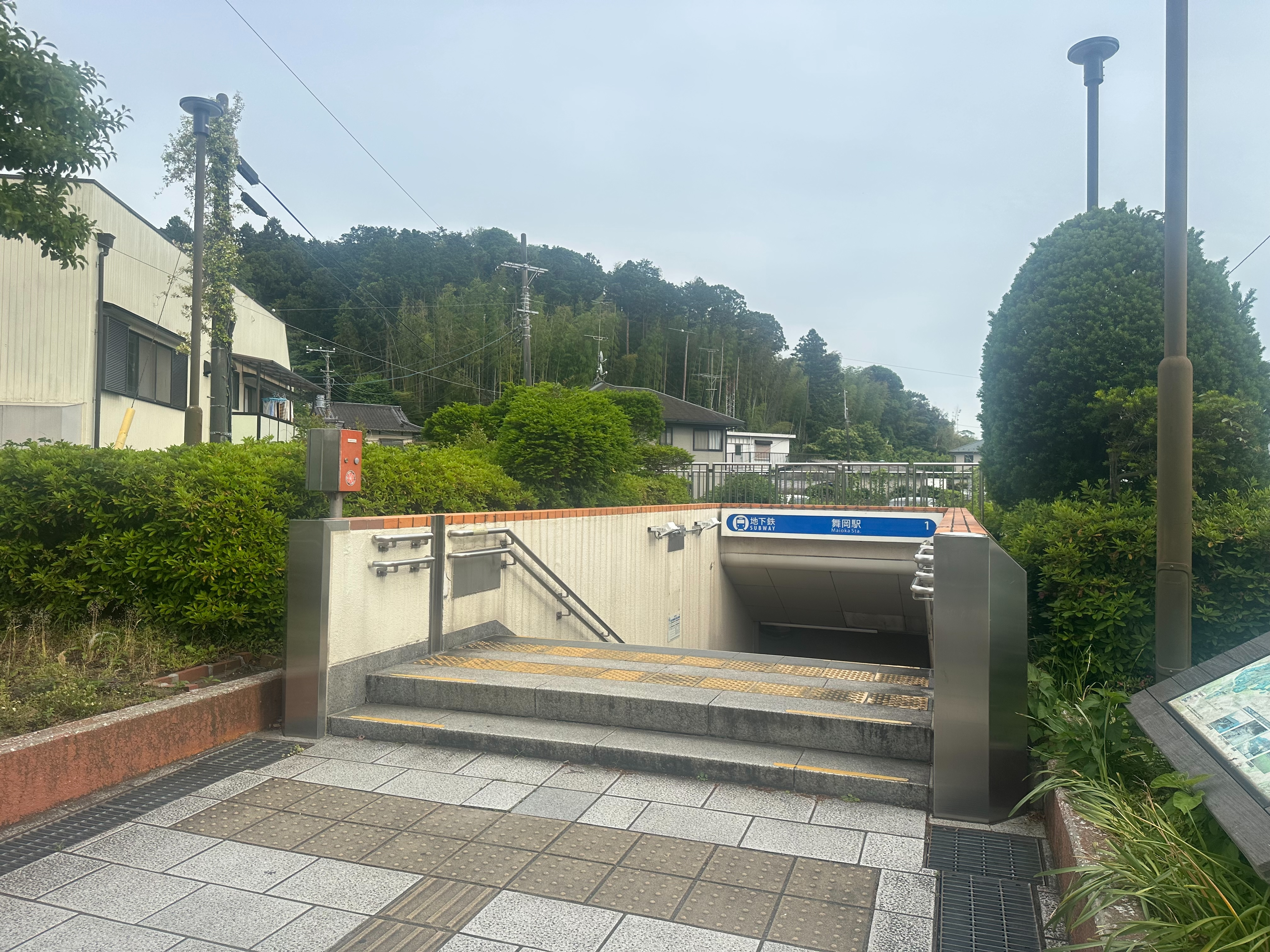
- Exit No.1 of Maioka Station

General information
- Location: Maioka-chō 771, Totsuka, Yokohama, Kanagawa （横浜市戸塚区舞岡町771） Japan
- System: Yokohama Municipal Subway station
- Operator: Yokohama City Transportation Bureau
- Line: Blue Line
- Platforms: 2 side platforms
- Tracks: 2

Other information
- Station code: B07

History
- Opened: 14 March 1985; 41 years ago

Passengers
- 2008: 2,325 daily

Services
Preceding station	Yokohama Municipal Subway	Following station
Totsuka B06 towards Shonandai	Blue Line Local	Shimonagaya B08 towards Azamino
Location
- Location within Yokohama Location within Kanagawa Prefecture Location within Japan

Maioka Station (舞岡駅, Maioka-eki) is an underground metro station located in Totsuka-ku, Yokohama, Kanagawa, Japan operated by the Yokohama Municipal Subway’s Blue Line (Line 1). It is 9.0 kilometers from the terminus of the Blue Line at Shōnandai Station.

== Lines ==
- Yokohama Municipal Subway
  - Blue Line

== Station layout ==
Maioka Station has a two underground opposed side platforms.

=== Platforms ===
1	■ Blue Line (Yokohama)	Shōnandai
2	■ Blue Line (Yokohama)	Totsuka, Kamiōoka, Kannai, Yokohama, Azamino

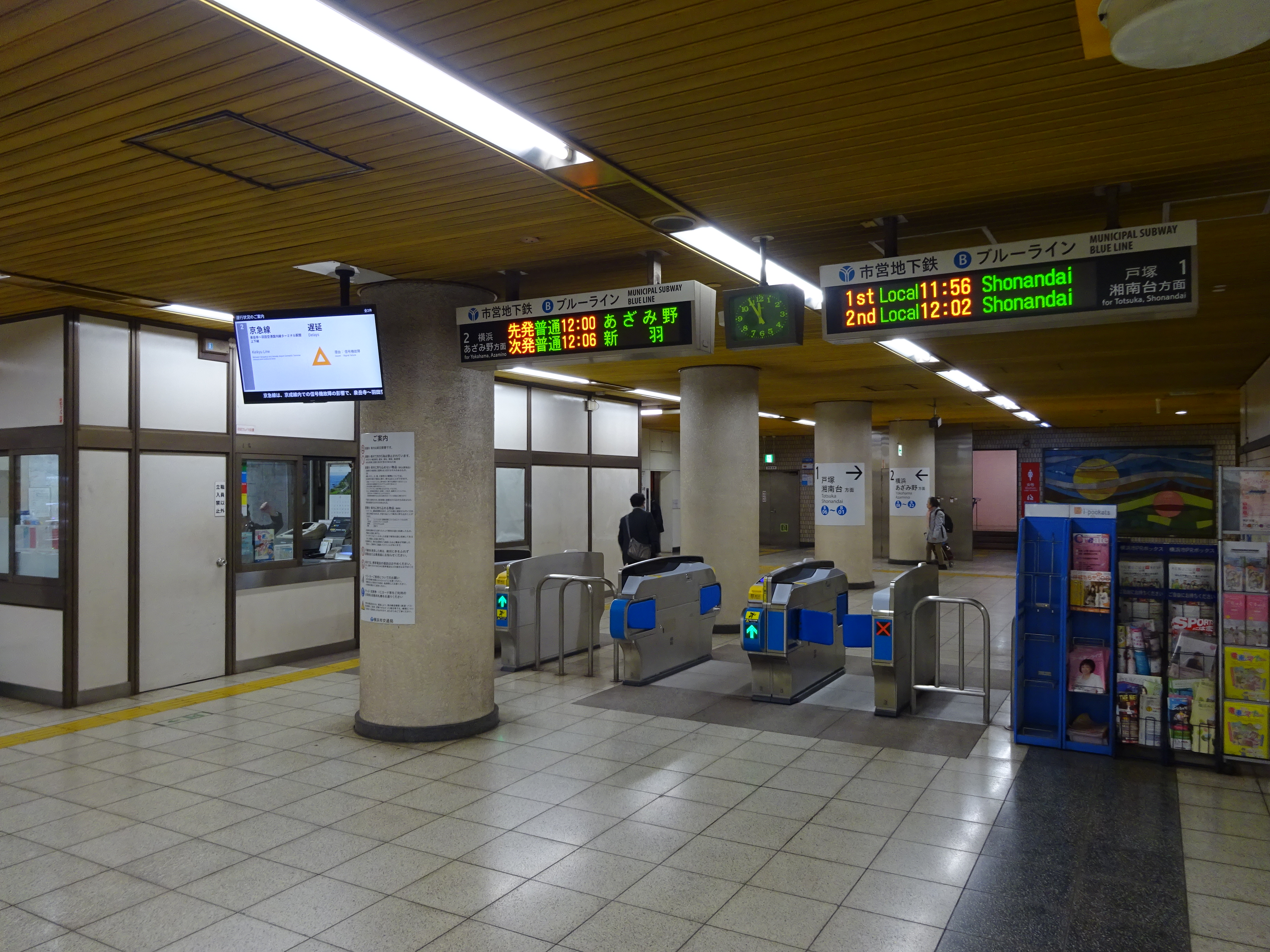
Ticket gates

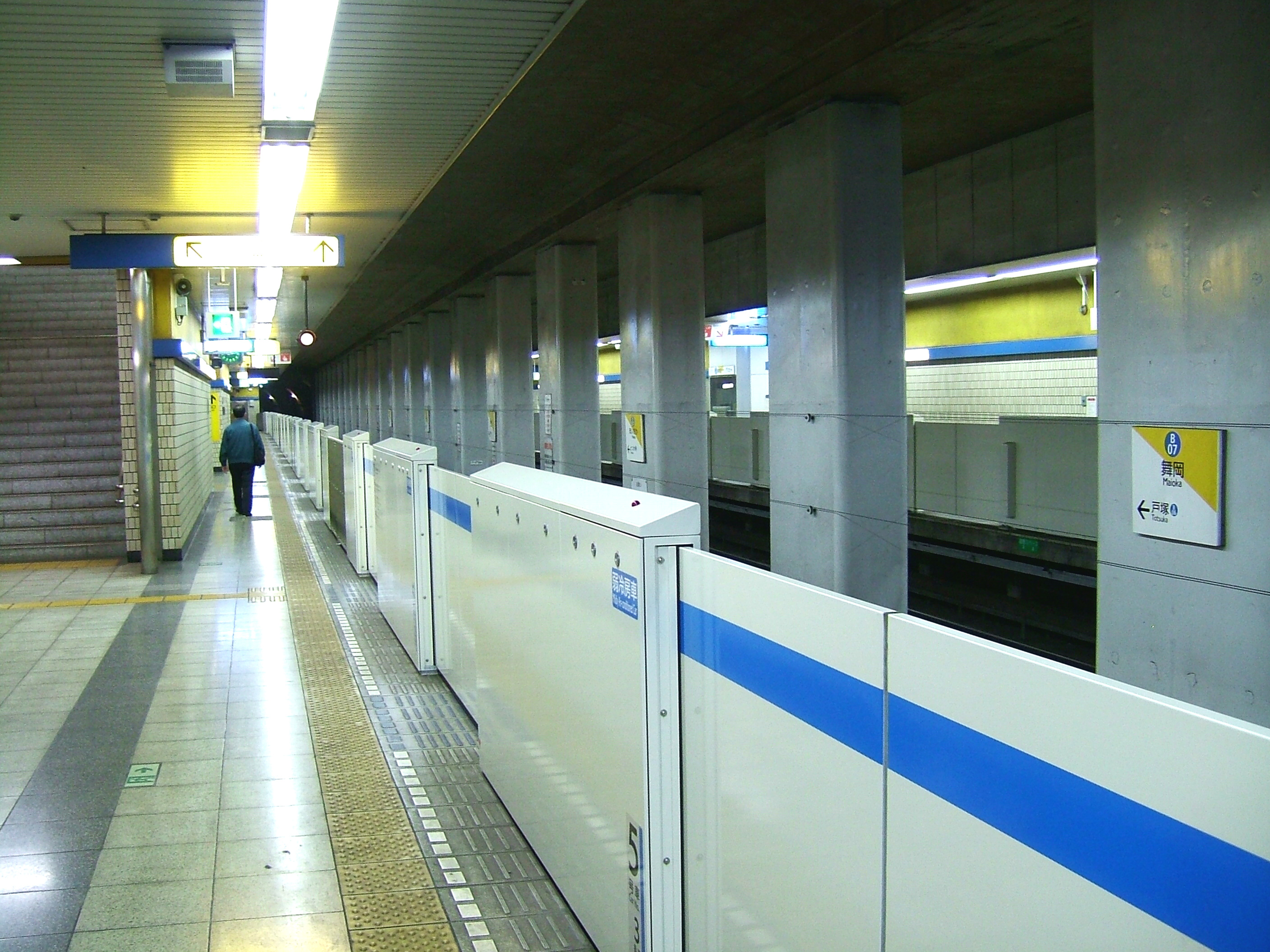
Platform

== History ==
Maioka Station was opened on 14 March 1985, originally as a terminal station of the Blue Line. It became an intermediate station when the line was extended to Totsuka on 24 May 1987. Platform screen doors were installed in September 2007.
