= Byōbugaura Station =

Railway station in Yokohama, Japan

KK45 Byōbugaura Station 屏風浦駅
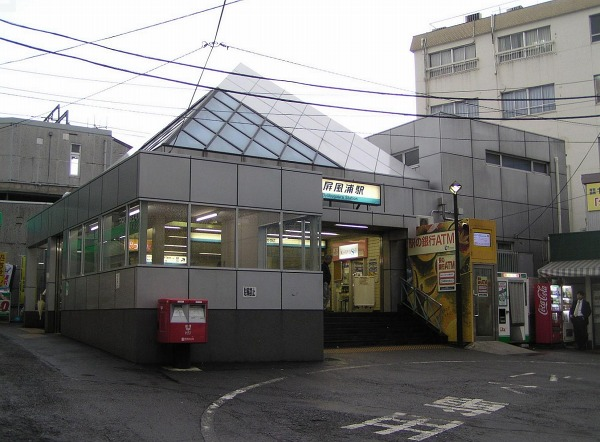
- Byōbugaura Station

General information
- Location: Mori 3-18-6, Isogo-ku, Yokohama-shi, Kanagawa-ken 235-0023; Japan
- Coordinates: 35.3940°N 139.6104°E
- Operator: Keikyū
- Line: Keikyū Main Line
- Distance: 33.0 km from Shinagawa
- Platforms: 2 side platforms
- Connections: Bus stop

Other information
- Station code: KK45
- Website: Official website

History
- Opened: April 1, 1930

Passengers
- 2019: 18,233 daily

Services
Preceding station	Keikyu	Following station
Sugita KK46 towards Uraga	Main Line Local	Kamiōoka KK44 towards Shinagawa
Location
- Location within Kanagawa Prefecture Location within Japan

Byōbugaura Station (屏風浦駅, Byōbugaura-eki) is a passenger railway station located in Isogo-ku, Yokohama, Kanagawa Prefecture, Japan, operated by the private railway company Keikyū.

== Lines ==
Byōbugaura Station is served by the Keikyū Main Line and is located 33.0 kilometers from the terminus of the line at Shinagawa Station in Tokyo.

== Station layout ==
The station consists of two elevated opposed side platforms with the station building underneath.

== Platforms ==
1	■ Keikyū Main Line	for Kanazawa Bunko, Misakiguchi, Uraga
2	■ Keikyū Main Line	for Kamiōoka, Yokohama, Haneda Airport Terminal 1·2, Shinagawa, Sengakuji, Oshiage

== History ==
Byōbugaura Station was opened on April 1, 1930 as a station on the Shōnan Electric Railway, which merged with the Keihin Electric Railway on November 1, 1941. A new station building was erected in 1964, and extensively remodeled in 1991.

Keikyū introduced station numbering to its stations on 21 October 2010; Byōbugaura Station was assigned station number KK45.

== Passenger statistics ==
In fiscal 2019, the station was used by an average of 18,233 passengers daily.

The passenger figures for previous years are as shown below.

Fiscal year	daily average
2005	17,998
2010	18,056
2015	17,764

== Surrounding area ==
- Isogo Central Neurosurgery Hospital
- Byobugaura Hospital
- Shiomidai housing complex
- Koshinkai Shiomidai Hospital

== See also ==
- List of railway stations in Japan
