= Yokohama Municipal Subway =

Rapid transit network of Yokohama, Japan

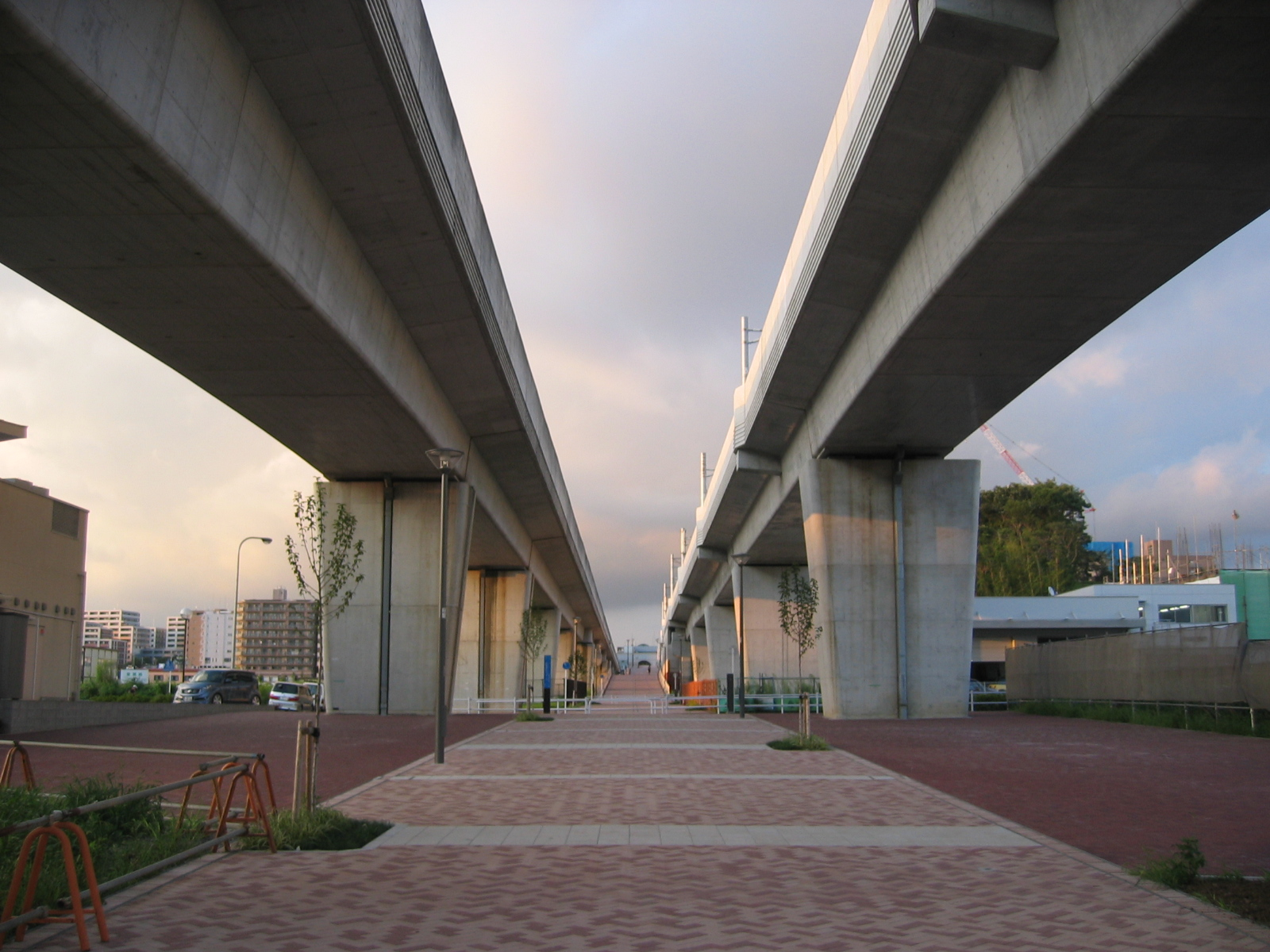
- The elevated section of the Blue and Green lines

Overview
- Native name: 横浜市営地下鉄
- Locale: Yokohama, Japan
- Transit type: Rapid transit
- Number of lines: 2 (Blue & Green)
- Number of stations: 42
- Website: Official site

Operation
- Began operation: December 16, 1972; 53 years ago
- Operator: Yokohama City Transportation Bureau

Technical
- System length: 53.4 km (33.2 mi)
- Track gauge: 1,435 mm (4 ft 8 1/2 in) standard gauge
System map
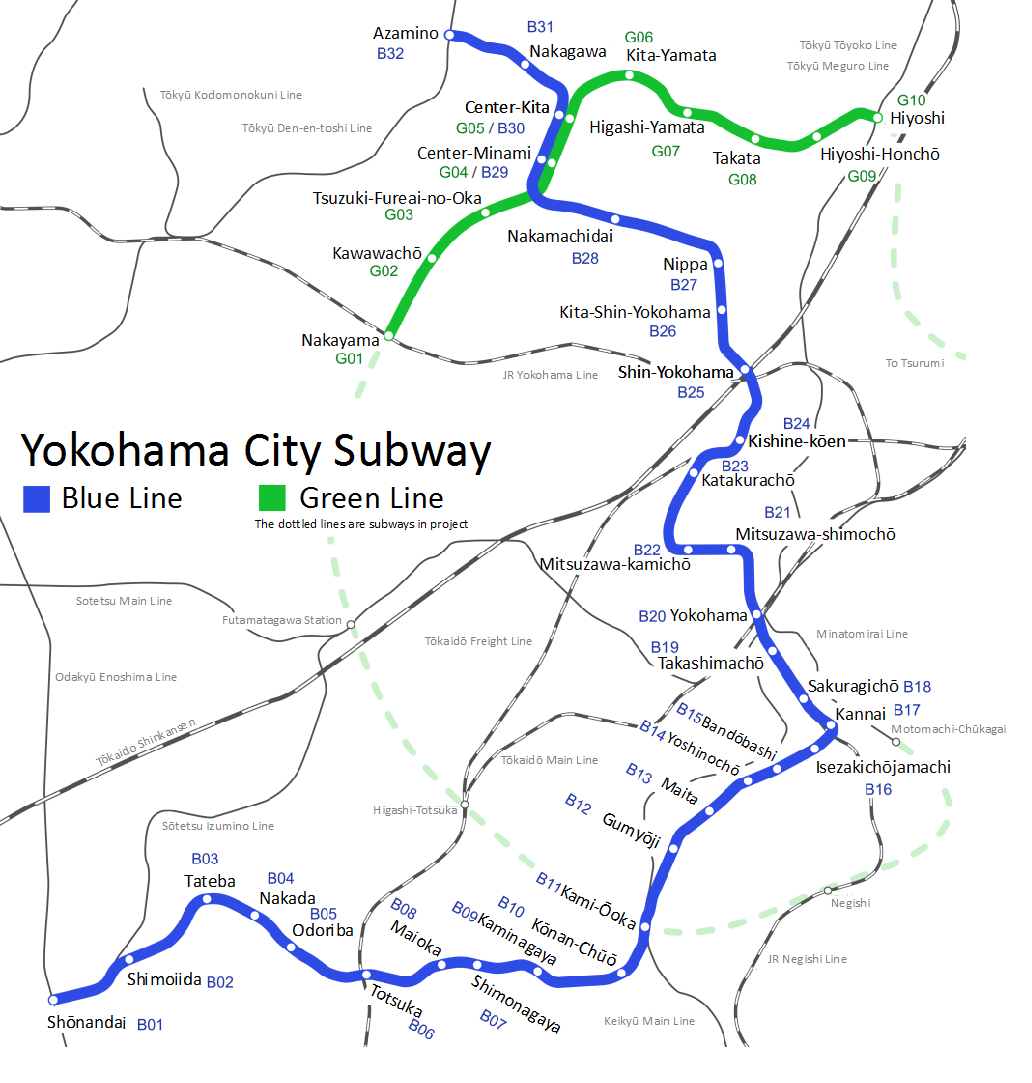

Yokohama Municipal Subway (Japanese: 横浜市営地下鉄, Hepburn: Yokohama-shiei chikatetsu) is a rapid transit system that serves Yokohama in Kanagawa Prefecture, Japan, and is operated by the Yokohama City Transportation Bureau.

The network consists of two routes, the Blue Line and the Green Line which together extend for approximately 53.4 kilometres and include 42 stations.

== History ==
=== Chronology ===
- October 21, 1950 – Enactment of the Yokohama International Port City Construction Act (横浜国際港都建設法) as a post-World War II reconstruction policy.
- 1957 – In response to the Yokohama International Port City Construction Act of 1950, Yokohama City formulated the “Yokohama International Port City Construction Comprehensive Basic Plan” (横浜国際港都建設総合基幹計画).
- March 1, 1960 – The Transportation Research Office was established within the Transportation Bureau, and studies on high-speed mass transit began.
- January 25, 1962 – The Yokohama City High-Speed Railway Planning Research Committee (横浜市高速度鉄道計画研究調査会) was established. Two options were considered: a monorail, a medium-capacity system (MCS) that offered lower construction costs but required installation along roads at least 22 meters wide. The other was a subway system. After comparing these options, the report concluded that the Yokohama City Tram, which had a lower transport capacity than buses and contributed to road congestion, should be abolished and replaced with a subway.
- March, 1963 – Report compiled recommending the abolition of streetcars and construction of an underground high-speed railway.
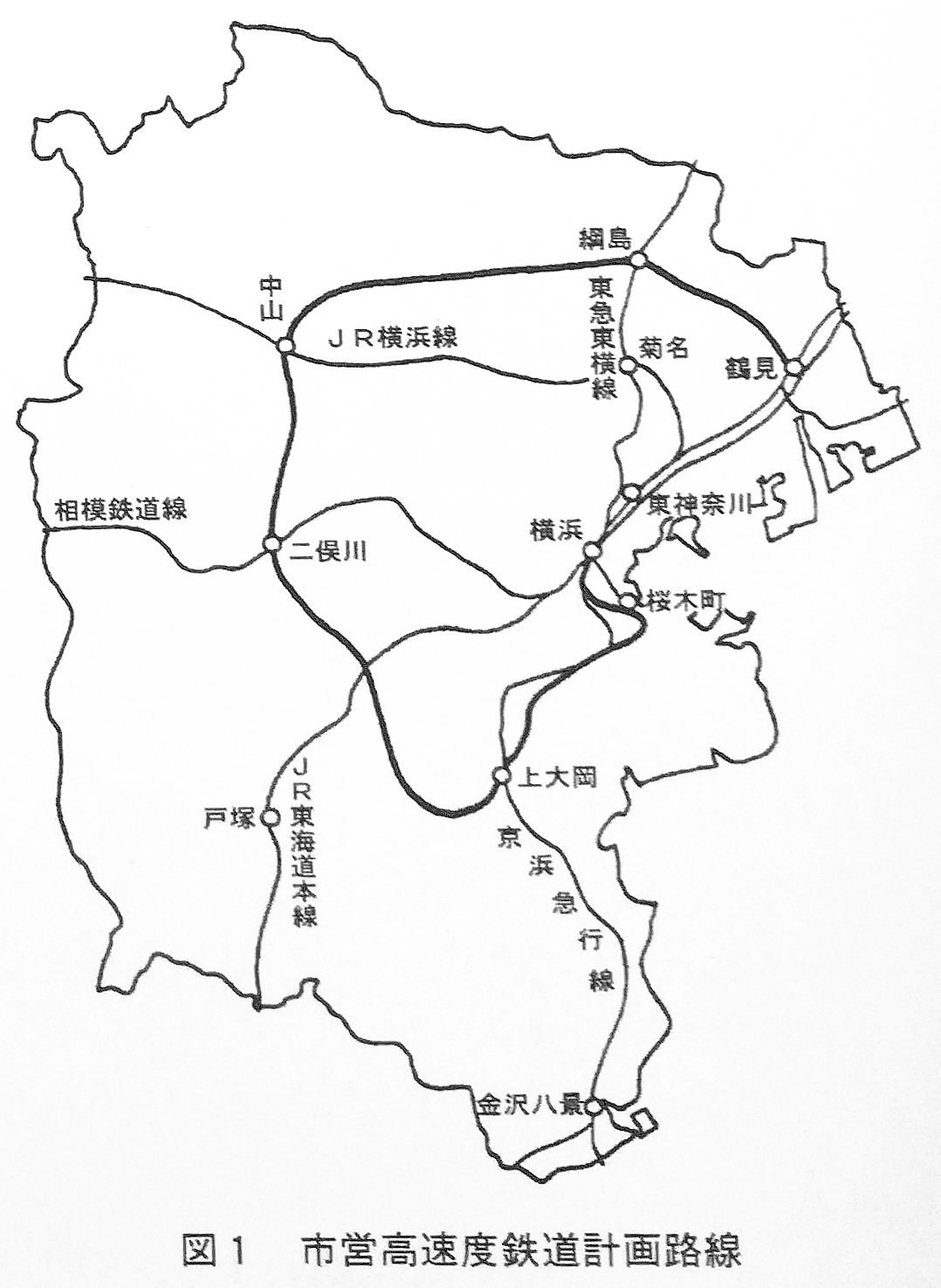
1957 map of proposed municipal subway lines.

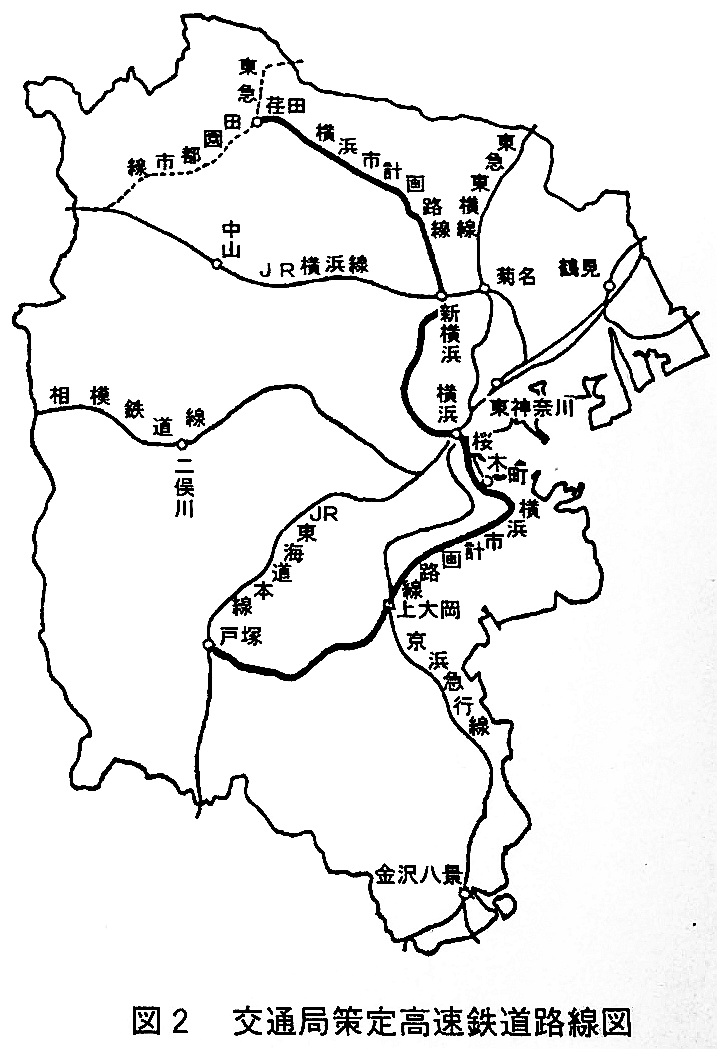
1963 map of proposed municipal subway lines.

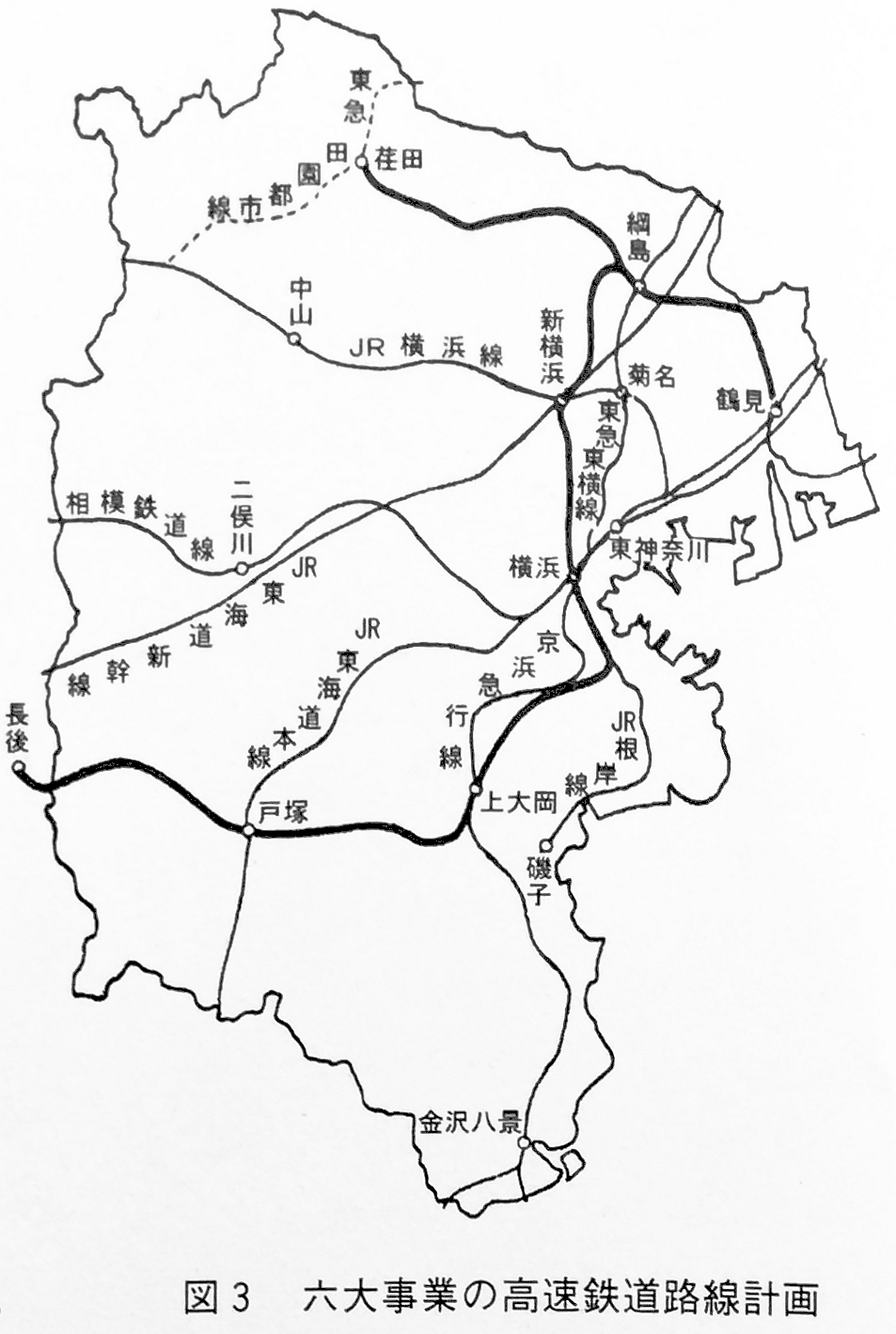
1965 map of proposed municipal subway lines
- July 15, 1965 – The Ministry of Transport established the Yokohama Subcommittee to study railway development plans for the entire city and released a subway plan designating four lines totaling 64.5 km.
- October 1, 1968 – The groundbreaking ceremony for Line 1 was held.
- March 31, 1972 – The Yokohama City Tram and Yokohama Municipal Trolleybus were abolished.
- December 16, 1972 – Line 1 opens between Isezakichōjamachi Station and Kamiooka Station.
- September 4, 1976 – Line 1 opens between Isezakichōjamachi and Yokohama, and between Kamiooka and Kaminagaya and began through service.
- March 14, 1985 – Line 1 opens between Yokohama and Shin-Yokohama, and Line 3 between Kaminagaya and Maioka.
- May 24, 1987 – Line 1 opens between Maioka and Totsuka.
- March 18, 1993 – Line 3 opens between Shin-Yokohama and Azamino.
- August 29, 1999 – Line 1 opens between Totsuka and Shonandai. Shin-Yokohama-Kita Station renamed Kita-Shin-Yokohama Station.
- March 30, 2008 – Green Line opens.

== Lines ==
Name	Line	Termini	Opened	Last extension	Length km (mi)	Stations	Train length
Blue Line	1	Shonandai – Kannai	December 16, 1972	August 29, 1999	19.7 (12.2)	17	6 cars
Blue Line	3	Kannai – Azamino	March 14, 1985	March 18, 1993	20.7 (12.9)	16 (Note: Including Kannai Station)	6 cars
Green Line	4	Nakayama – Hiyoshi	March 30, 2008	—N/a	13.1 (8.1)	10	4 or 6 cars
Total					53.5 (33.2)	42	

The Yokohama Municipal Subway consists of three lines: Line 1, Line 3 and Line 4. Line 1 and 3 are operated as a single line, nicknamed the Blue Line, and Line 4 is nicknamed the Green Line. The Blue Line and Green Line monikers came into official use when the latter was added to the network on March 30, 2008.

Transfer between the Blue and Green lines is possible at Center-Kita and Center-Minamis stations. Feeder bus services from the western Kawasaki City area run to Azamino Station.

The "missing" Line 2 was planned to run from Kanagawa-Shinmachi Station via Yokohama Station to Byobugaura Station. The 11.4-kilometre (7.1 mi) line was previously considered a bypass line for easing congestion on the Keikyū Main Line; however, it was deemed unnecessary after the Keikyu Line increased its capacity.

=== Blue Line ===
The Blue Line (Lines 1/3) is operated as an integrated route of 40.4 kilometres (25.1 mi) between Shōnandai Station in Fujisawa and Azamino Station. The Blue Line is Japan's second-longest subway line, after the 40.7 (25.3) Toei Ōedo Line in Tokyo.

In July 2011, a "mobile phone power off area" was set up in each car, and the use of mobile phones is officially banned except in other areas.

=== Green Line ===
The Green Line (Line 4) opened on March 30, 2008, between Hiyoshi Station and Nakayama Station, a distance of 13.0 kilometres (8.1 mi). It takes approximately 21 minutes to make the trip.

By April 2023, the lengthening of 4-car trains to 6-car trains had commenced, and by the end of fiscal year 2024, 10 of the 17 trains will be 6-car trains.

Similar to the Toei Ōedo Line, the Green Line uses linear induction motors for propulsion.

=== Planned extensions ===
Planned routes
Name	Line	Termini
Blue Line	3	Azamino – Shin-Yurigaoka
Green Line	4	Nakayama – Futamatagawa – Higashi-Totsuka – Kamiooka – Negishi – Motomachi-Chūkagai Hiyoshi – Tsurumi
Discontinued routes
	2	Kanagawa-Shinmachi – Byōbugaura
Blue Line	3	Honmoku – Kannai

==== Blue Line ====
On 21 January 2020, Yokohama City and Kawasaki City announced the route and four new stations for the planned 6.5 km (4.0 mi) extension of the Blue Line from Azamino Station to Shin-Yurigaoka Station on the Odakyū Odawara Line. Construction of this section is expected to be completed by 2030. In June 2020, the Transportation Bureau started environmental impact assessment procedures for the extension project.

==== Green Line ====
The Green Line was built as part of a larger master plan to construct a circular line in Yokohama. The full line will be a C-shaped line that stretches from Tsurumi Station via Hiyoshi Station, Nakayama Station, Futamata-gawa Station, Higashi-Totsuka Station, Kamiōoka Station, and Negishi Station to Motomachi-Chūkagai Station.

=== Station numbering ===
Numerical designations for the stations on the Blue Line were introduced in 2002, coinciding with Yokohama city hosting the finals of the 2002 FIFA World Cup and the subway's 30th anniversary, starting from Shonandai station (1) to Azamino station (32). With 32 stations on the line and 32 teams in the World Cup, each station was themed after a country. Alphabetical designations were added when the Green Line opened. The Blue Line stations are B01 through B32, while the Green Line stations start from Nakayama Station (G01) to Hiyoshi Station (G10). At two stations—Center-Minami Station and Center-Kita Station—where both lines overlap, a different station number is attached to each route.

== Rolling stock ==
=== Current vehicles ===
==== Blue Line ====
- 3000 series (3000A series, 3000N series, 3000R series, 3000S series and 3000V series)
- 4000 series

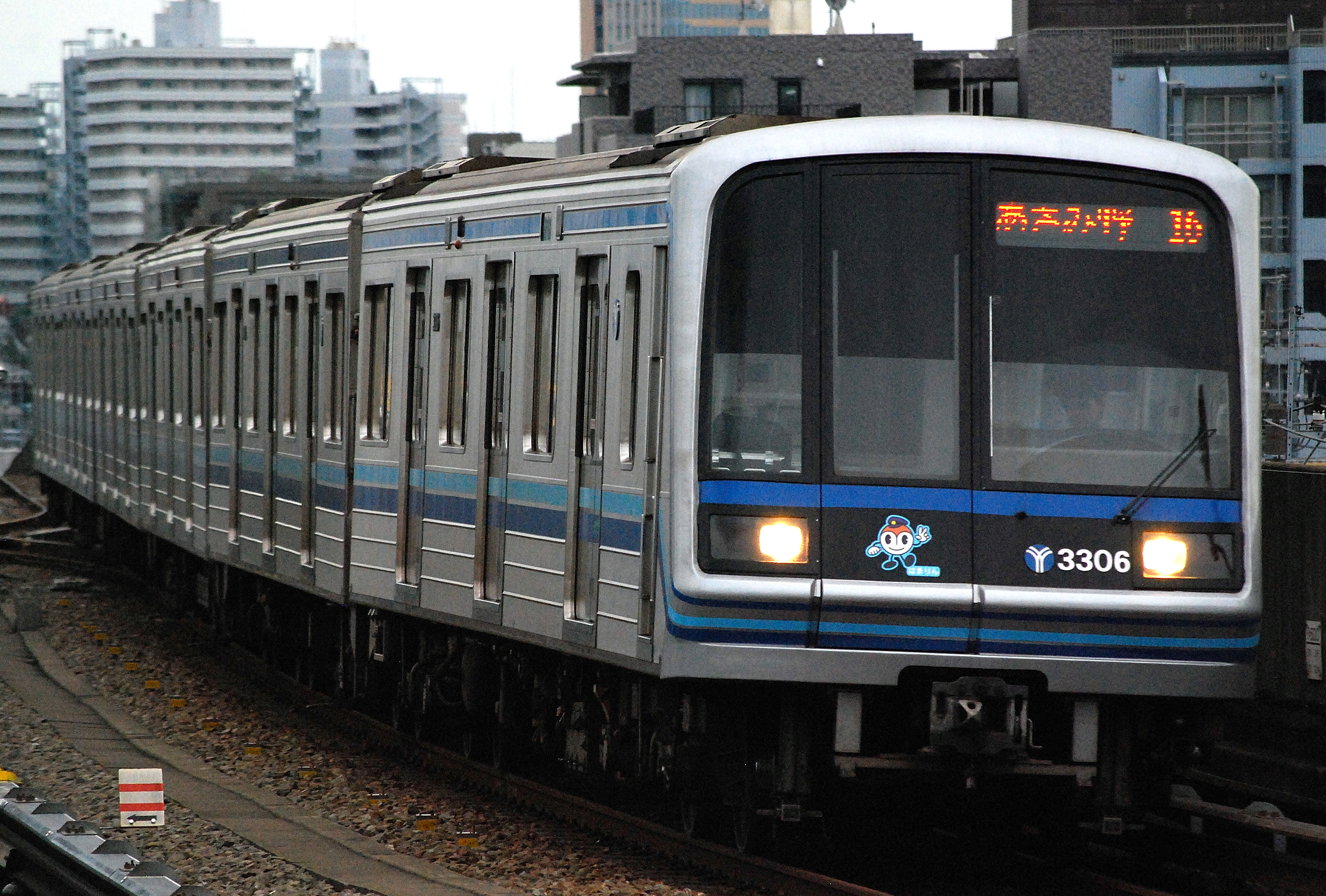
3000A series

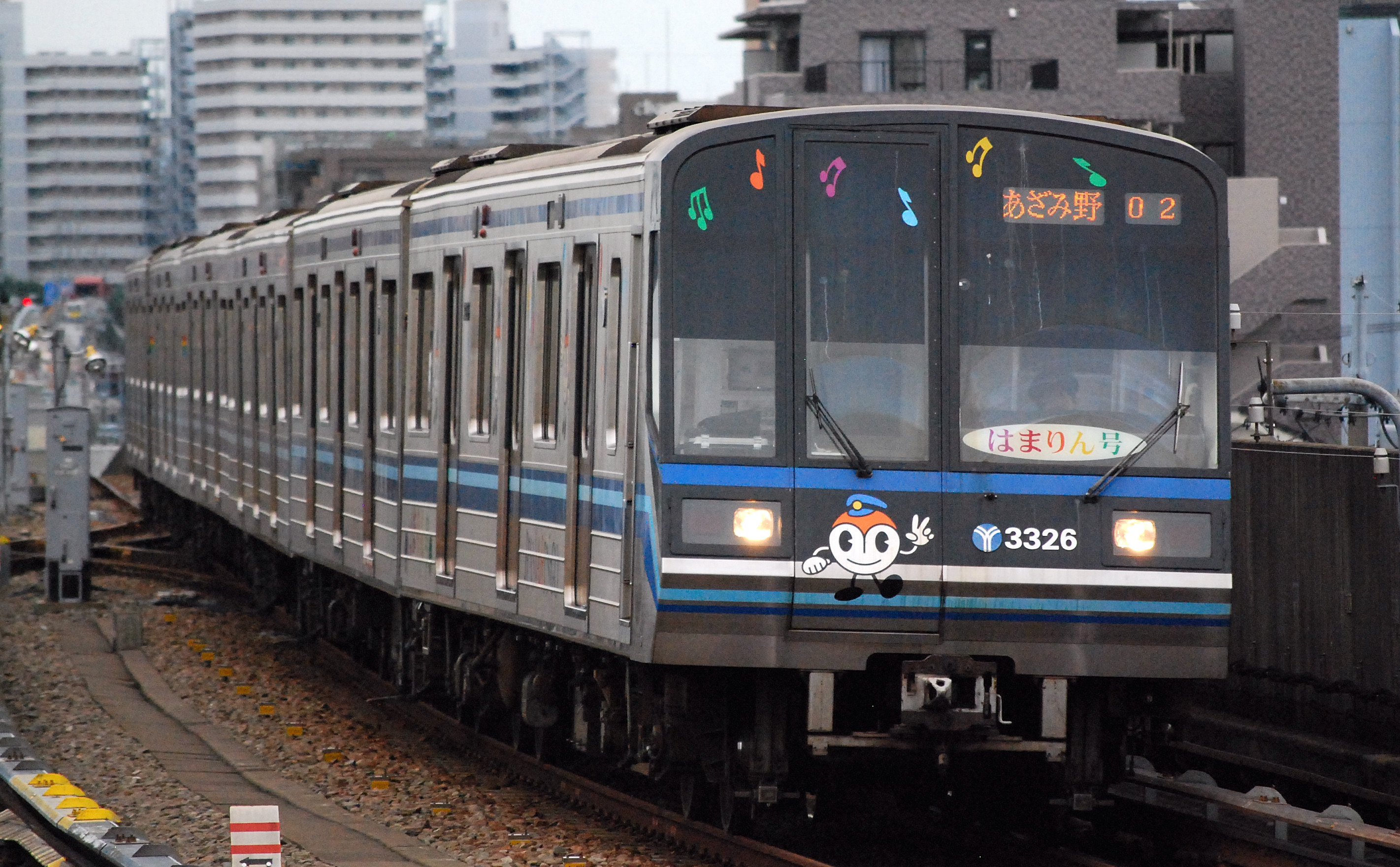
3000N series

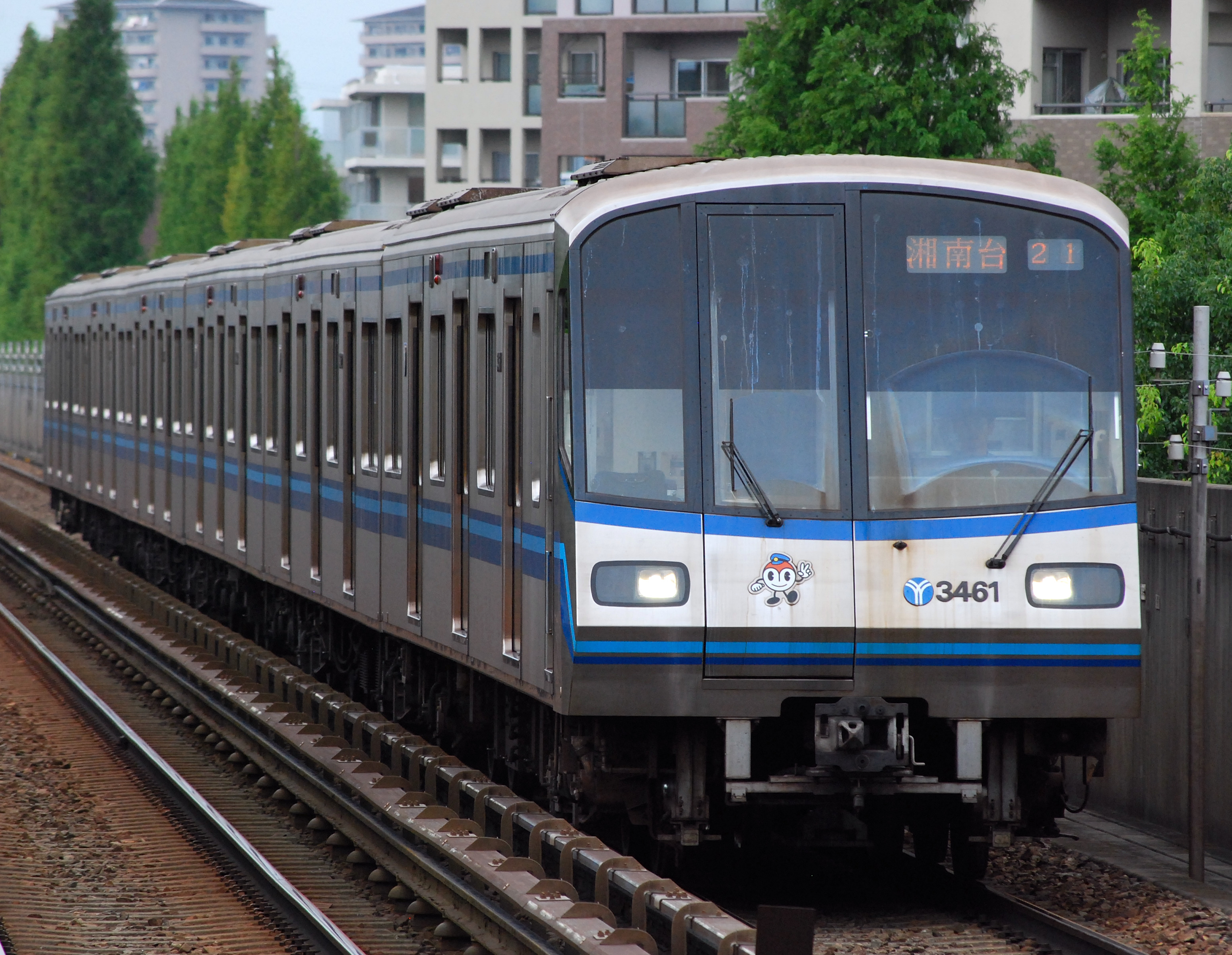
3000R series

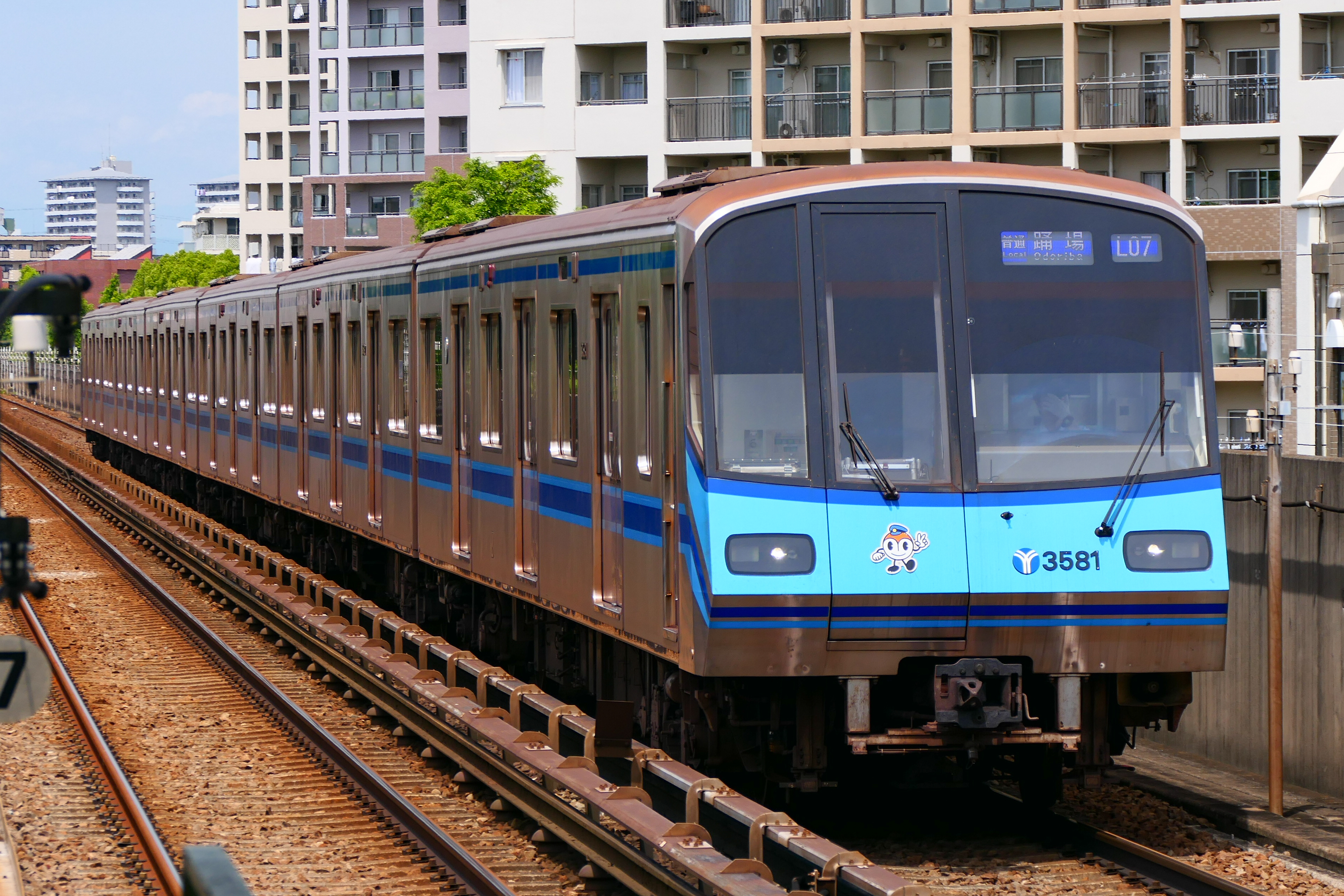
3000S series

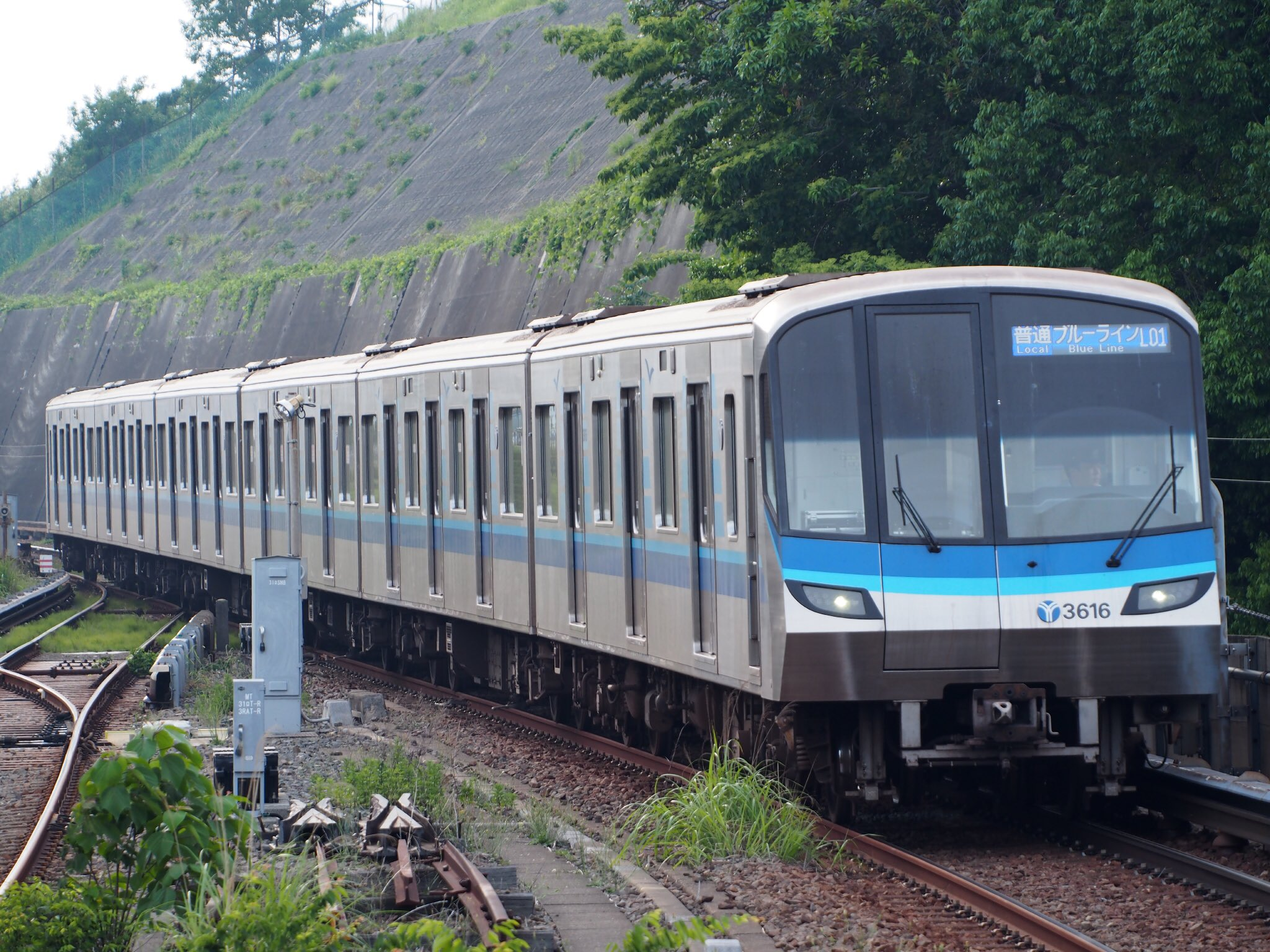
3000V series

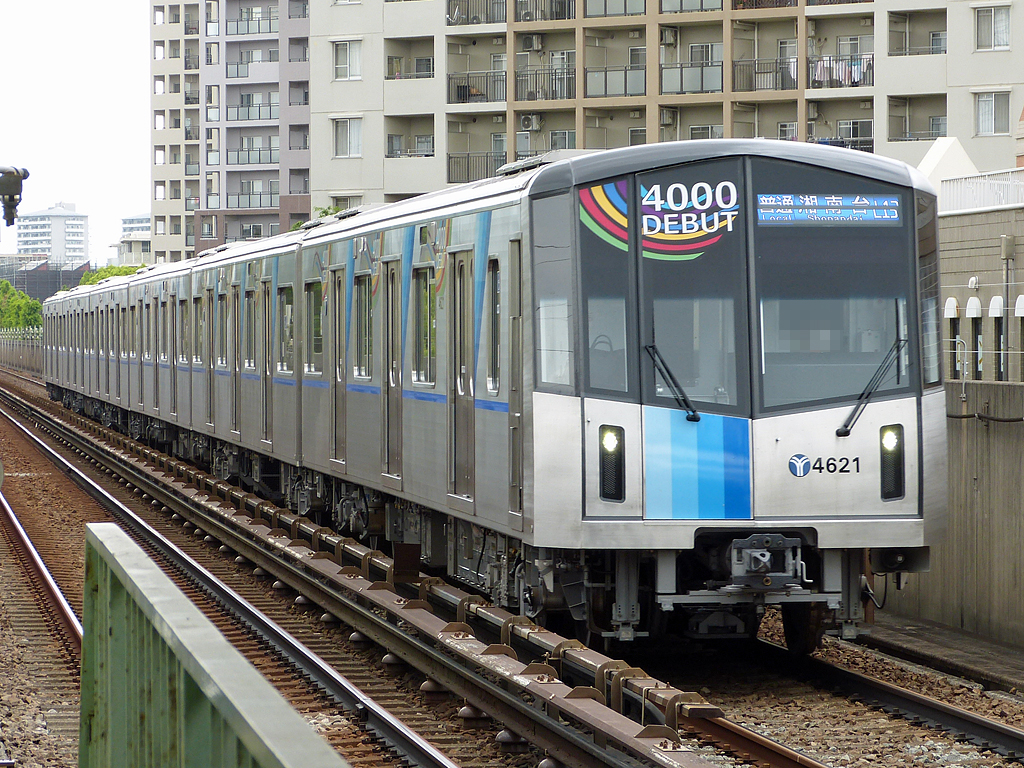
4000 series

==== Green Line ====
- 10000 series

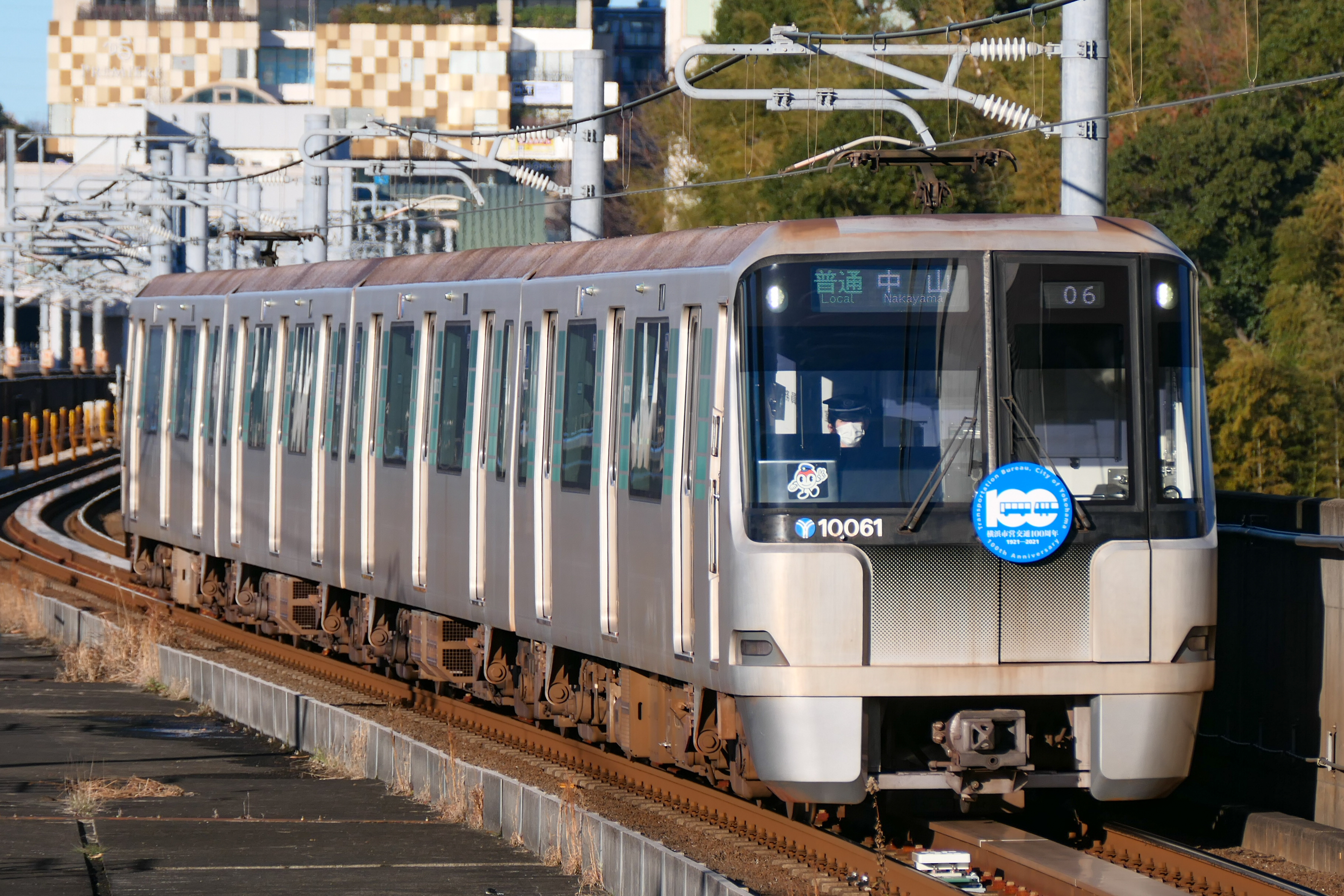
10000 series

=== Former vehicles ===
==== Blue Line ====
- 1000 series
- 2000 series

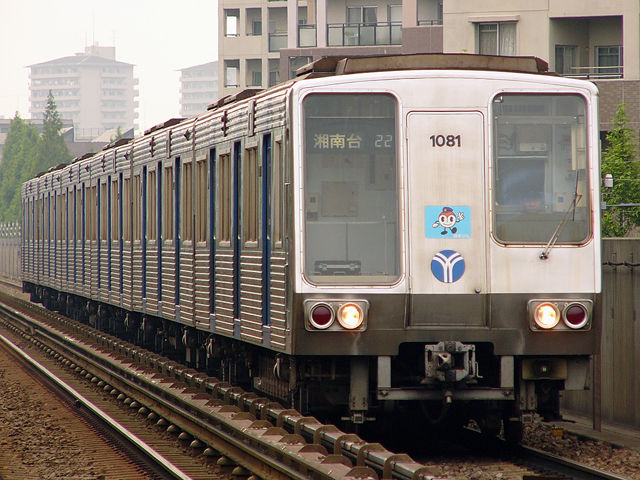
1000 series

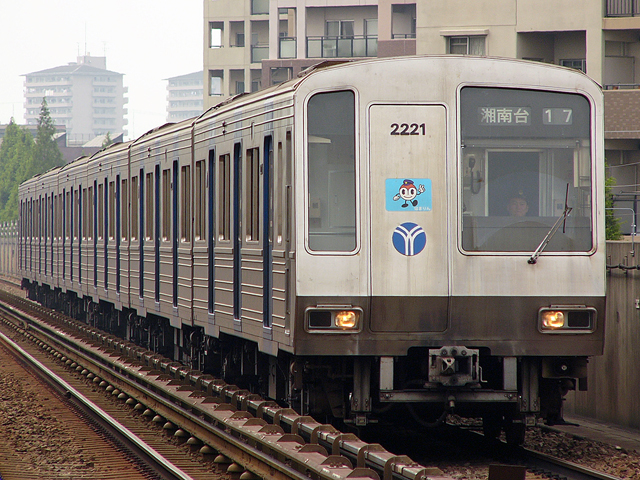
2000 series

== See also ==
- List of metro systems
- Minatomirai Line, a private subway line in Yokohama
- Transport in Greater Tokyo
