= Kamiōoka Station =

Metro station in Yokohama, Japan

KK44 B11 Kamiōoka Station 上大岡駅
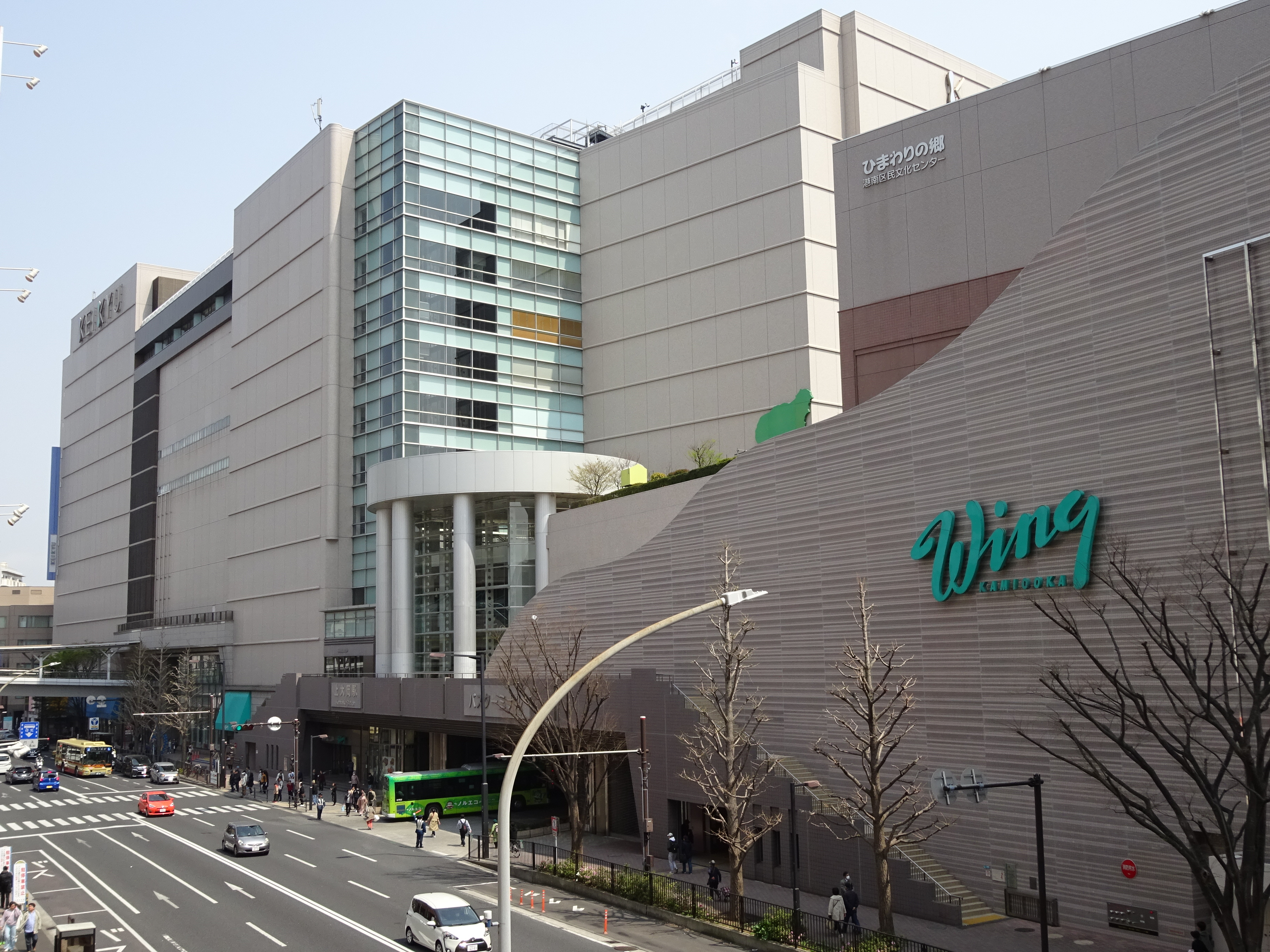
- Kamiōoka Station building

General information
- Location: 1-6-1 Kamiooka-Nishi, Kōnan-ku, Yokohama-shi, Kanagawa-ken 233-0002; Japan
- Coordinates: 35.4092083°N 139.5965981°E
- Operator: Keikyū; Yokohama City Transportation Bureau
- Lines: Keikyū Main Line; Blue Line
- Distance: 30.8 km (19.1 mi) from Shinagawa
- Platforms: 3 island platforms
- Connections: Bus stop

Other information
- Station code: KK44, B11

History
- Opened: April 1, 1930; 96 years ago

Passengers
- Daily (FY2019): 143,758 (Keikyu); 73,500 (Yokohama Subway)

Services
Preceding station	Keikyu	Following station
Kanazawa-bunko One-way operation	Morning Wing	Shinagawa KK01 towards Sengakuji
Kanazawa-bunko KK49 towards Misakiguchi	Evening Wing	Yokohama KK37 One-way operation
Kanazawa-bunko KK49 towards Horinouchi	Main Line Limited Express (Kaitoku)	Yokohama KK37 towards Sengakuji
Kanazawa-bunko KK49 towards Uraga	Main Line Limited Express (Tokkyū)	Yokohama KK37 towards Sengakuji
Sugita KK46 towards Kanazawa-hakkei	Main Line Express	Gumyōji KK43 towards Keikyū Kamata
Byōbugaura KK45 towards Uraga	Main Line Local	Gumyōji KK43 towards Shinagawa
Preceding station	Yokohama Municipal Subway	Following station
Kaminagaya B09 towards Shonandai	Blue Line Rapid	Kannai B17 towards Azamino
Kōnan-Chūō B10 towards Shonandai	Blue Line Local	Gumyōji B12 towards Azamino
Location
- Location within Yokohama Location within Kanagawa Prefecture Location within Japan

Kamiōoka Station (上大岡駅, Kamiōoka-eki) is an interchange railway station located in Kōnan-ku, Yokohama, Kanagawa Prefecture, Japan, operated by the private railway operator Keikyū and the Yokohama Municipal Subway.

== Lines ==
Kamiōoka Station is served by the Keikyū Main Line and the Yokohama Municipal Subway Blue Line (Line 1). It is 30.8 kilometers from the starting point of the Keikyū Main Line at Shinagawa Station and 13.8 kilometers from the terminus of the Blue Line at Shōnandai Station.

== Station layout ==
Keikyū Kamiōoka Station is an elevated station with two island platforms serving four tracks. The underground Blue Line station has a single island platform and two tracks.

=== Keikyū platforms ===
1, 2	■ Keikyū Main Line	for Yokosuka-chūō, Uraga, Miurakaigan, and Zushi·Hayama
3, 4	■ Keikyū Main Line	for Yokohama, Shinagawa, Haneda Airport (International Terminal, Domestic Terminal), and Shimbashi

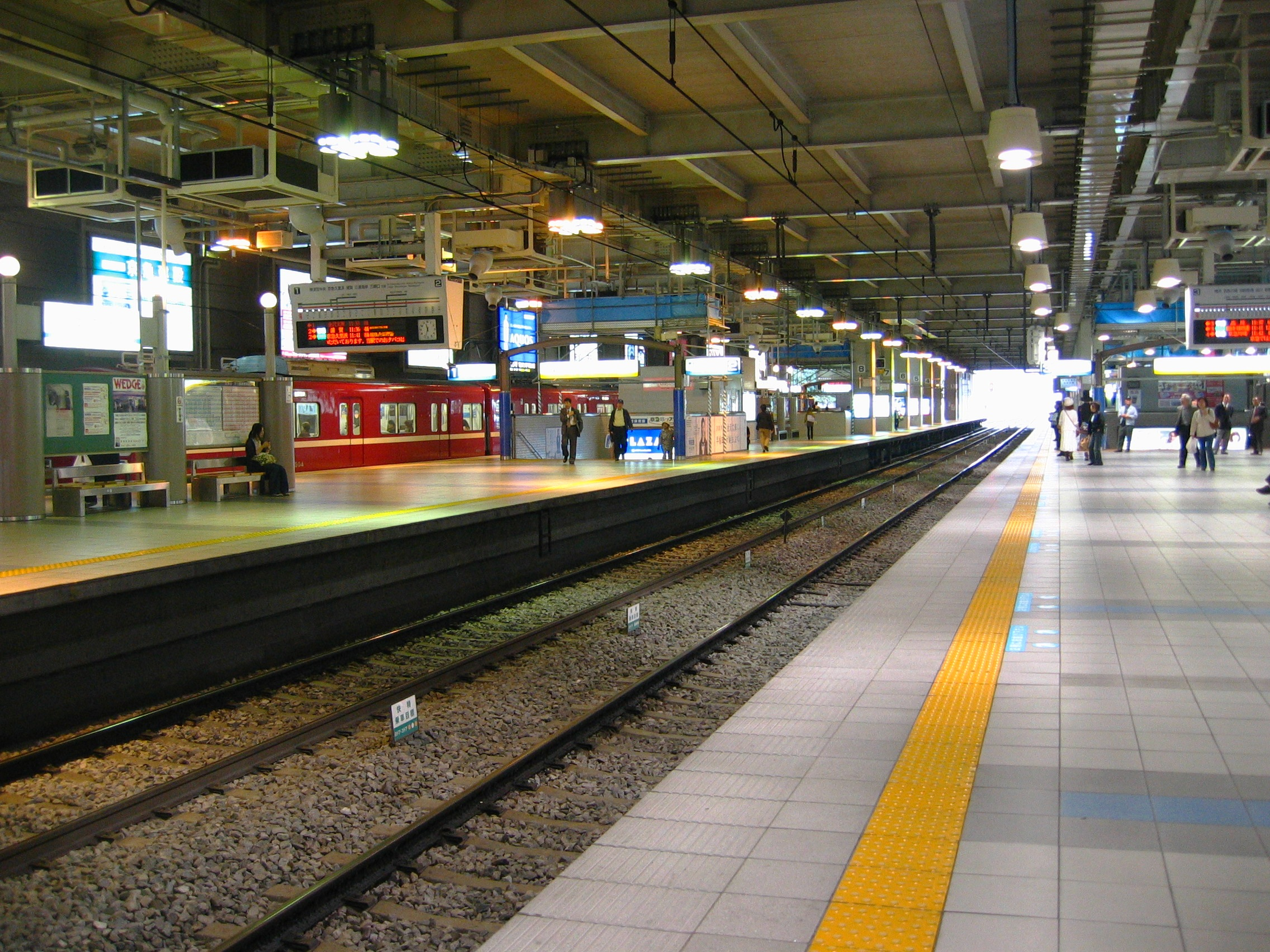
Keikyu platforms in 2007

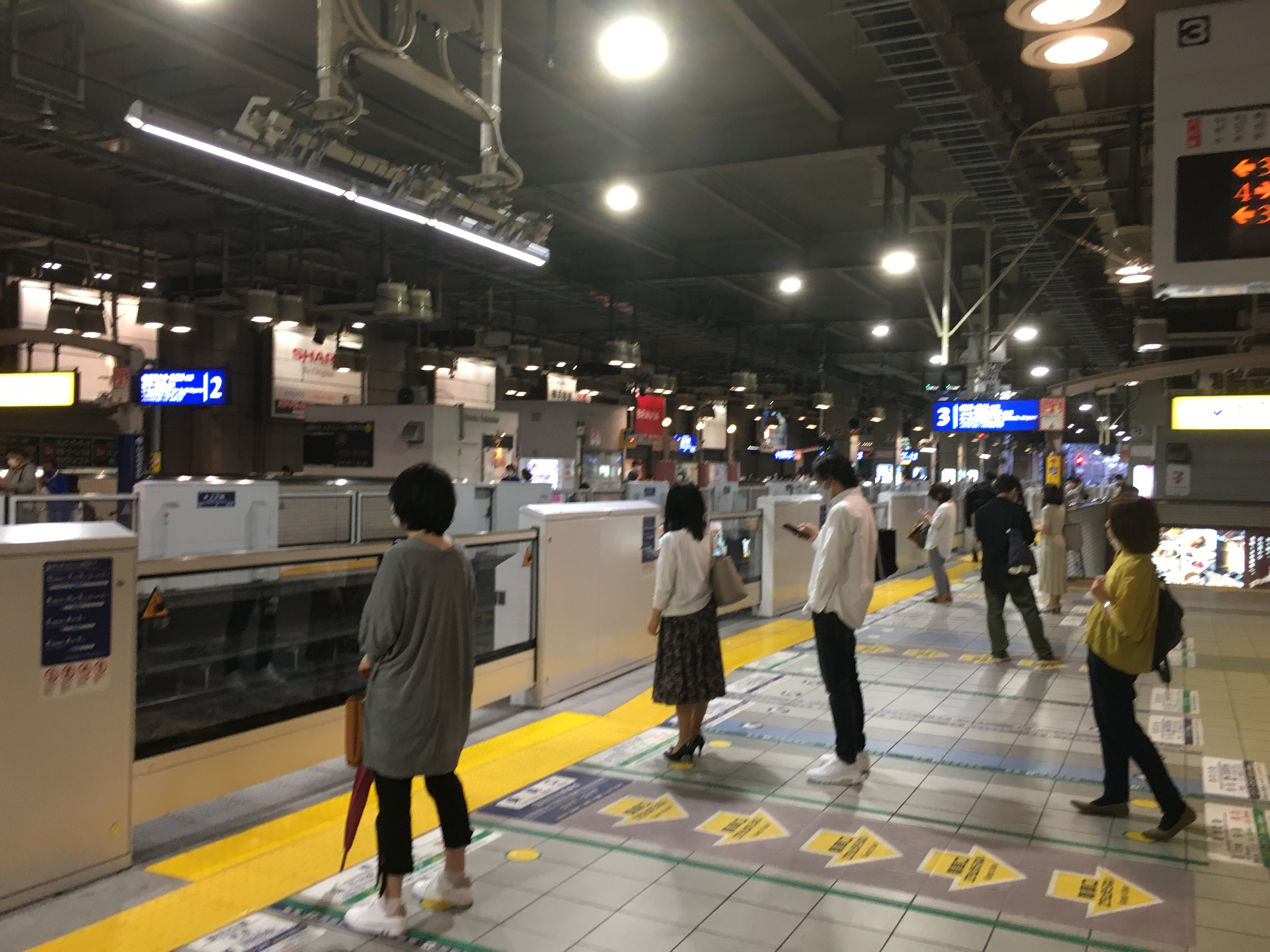
Keikyu platforms in 2021

=== Yokohama Municipal Subway platforms ===
1	■ Blue Line (Line 1)	for Totsuka and Shōnandai
2	■ Blue Line (Line 1)	for Kannai, Yokohama, Shin-Yokohama, and Azamino

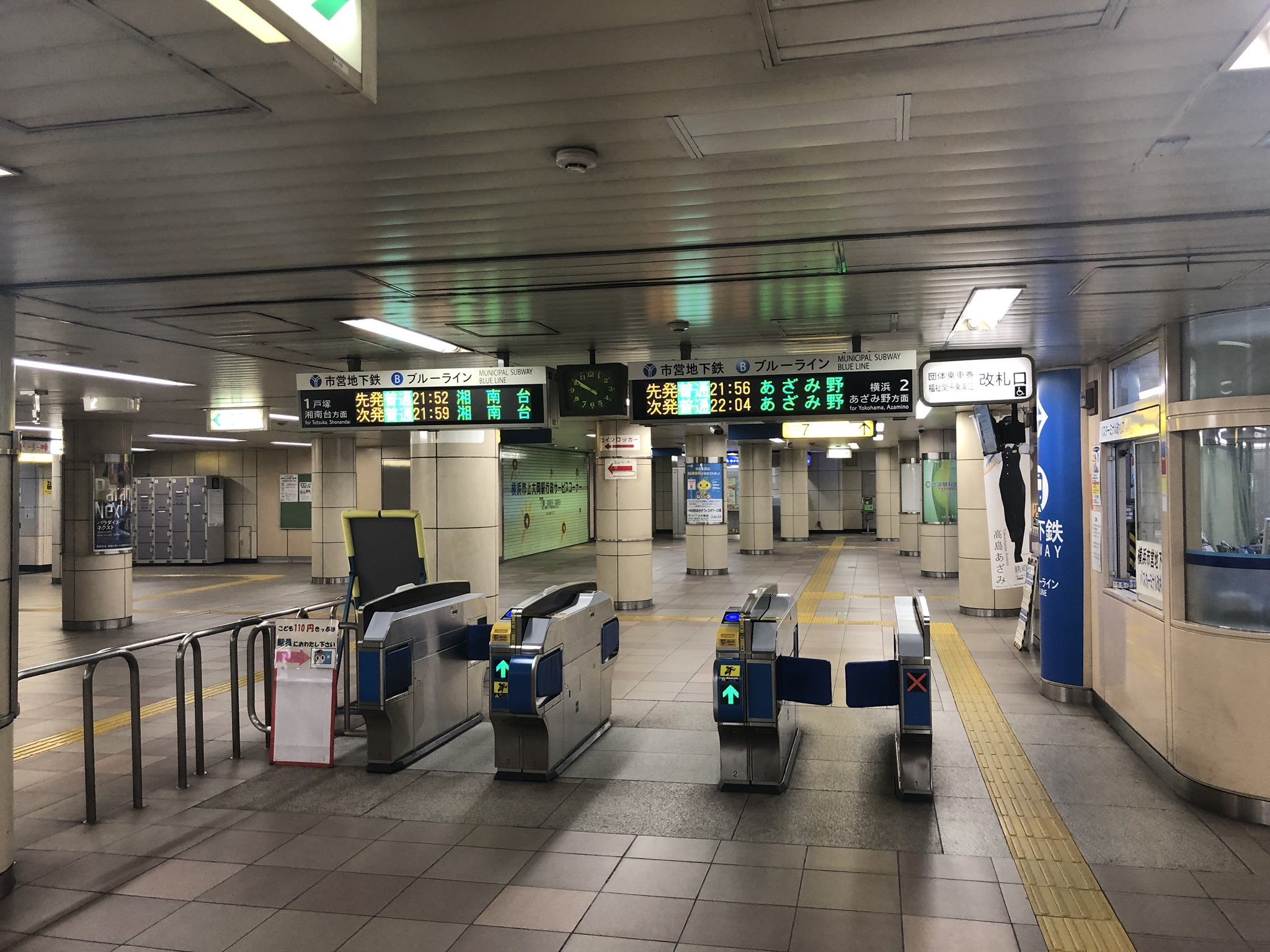
Ticket gates

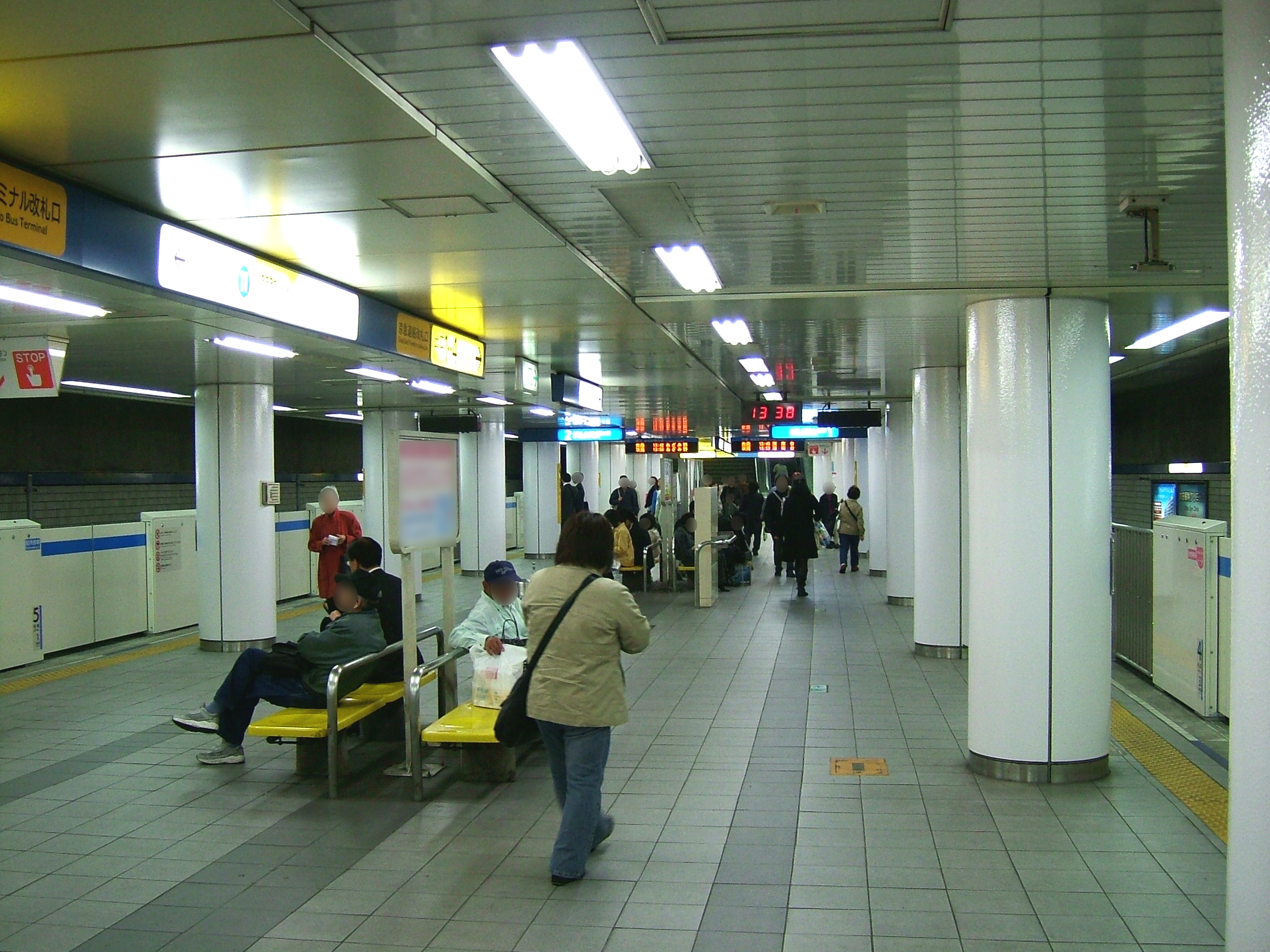
Platform

== History ==
Kamiōoka Station was opened on April 1, 1930 as a station on the Shōnan Electric Railway. The station building was rebuilt in 1963 to include a department store. The Yokohama Municipal Subway connected to Kamiōoka on December 16, 1972. A new station building was built from 1996-1998. Platform screen doors were installed at the underground platforms in September 2007.

Keikyū introduced station numbering to its stations on 21 October 2010; Kamiōoka Station was assigned station number KK44.

== Passenger statistics ==
In fiscal 2019, the Keikyū station was used by an average of 143,758 passengers daily. During the same period, the Yokohama Municipal Subway was used by an average of 73,500 passengers daily,

The daily average passenger figures for previous years are as shown below.

Fiscal year	Keikyū	Blue Line
2005	135,901	71,517
2010	141,742	70,964
2015	143,299	73,731

== Surrounding area ==
- Konan Ward Cultural Center "Sunflower Township"

== See also ==
- List of railway stations in Japan
