= Yokohama Municipal Bus =

Japanese bus network

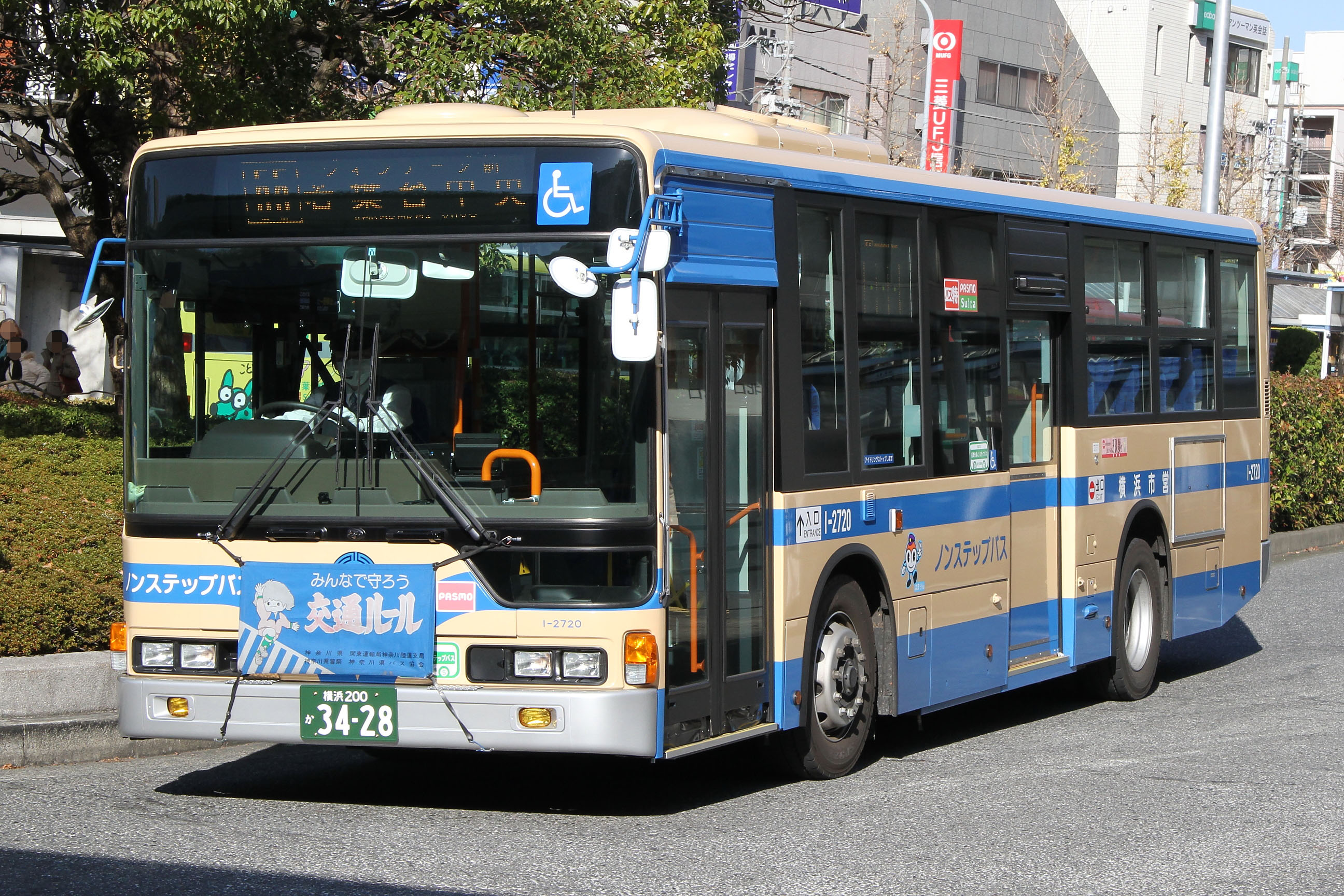
A fleet of Yokohama Municipal Bus

The Yokohama Municipal Bus is a public organisation that operates bus routes in Yokohama City.

== History ==
=== Origins and Early Expansion (1928–1930s) ===
Foundation (1928): Following the devastation of the 1923 Great Kanto Earthquake and subsequent municipal expansions, the city launched a bus service to complement the tram network. Commercial operations began on November 10, 1928, across 7 routes totaling 30.2 km, utilizing 30 Ford Model A 14-seater buses with female conductors.Network & Facilities: Temporary depot facilities gave way to the Sengencho and Tsurumi depots. In 1932, route numbering was introduced, establishing the city’s unique convention of using sequential, standalone numbers rather than kanji-prefixed identifiers.Competition with Private Carriers: Despite early municipal visions of unified public transport, private operators expanded rapidly, creating a competitive, fragmented local transit landscape.

=== Wartime Impact and Postwar Recovery (1938–1950s) ===
Wartime Constraints: Fuel shortages mandated the transition to charcoal-powered vehicles starting in 1938. The Yokohama Air Raid on May 29, 1945, destroyed the Sengencho Depot and over a third of the fleet, prompting emergency service suspensions followed by essential worker shuttles.Postwar Reorganization (1946): The Yokohama City Electric Bureau was renamed the Yokohama City Transportation Bureau. To navigate resource deficits, joint operating agreements were established with private operators such as Tokyu and Kanachu. Rapid Urban Growth: Postwar suburban expansion drove massive route additions. Network coverage grew from 15 km in 1945 to 215 km by 1952. By the late 1950s and 1960s, competitive tensions with private bus lines transitioned into cooperative route agreements and shared commuter passes.

=== Transition to Primary Transit & the "Six Major Projects" (1960s–1980s) ===
Motorization and Deficits: Traffic congestion and declining patronage led to growing deficits. In October 1966, the bureau was designated a financial rehabilitation entity.

Tram Replacement (1966–1972): All municipal tram and trolleybus lines were phased out and replaced by bus routes, expanding the fleet beyond 1,000 vehicles.

Supporting Urban Initiatives: Municipal buses served key developments under the Yokohama Six Major Projects, including feeder services to the newly opened Yokohama Municipal Subway (1972), early transport for Kohoku New Town, shuttle services for the 1989 Yokohama Exotic Showcase (YES '89), and trial expressway routes via the Yokohama Bay Bridge (Route 109).

=== Modernization, Accessibility, and Financial Reform (1990s–2000s) ===
Service Innovations: Late-night services launched in 1987, followed by the "15-minute to station" initiative in 1993 using mini-buses to serve transit deserts. Low-emission (CNG, hybrid) and barrier-free (non-step) buses were rolled out on a large scale. In 1998, the bureau introduced its mascot, Hamarin.

Restructuring (2000s): Under Mayor Hiroshi Nakada, management reforms addressed deficits and organizational compliance. Rather than full privatization, the city pursued an "improved public enterprise" model:

Operating responsibility for select depots and routes was subcontracted to Yokohama Kotsu Kaihatsu.

A comprehensive route overhaul between 2006 and 2008 eliminated redundant lines, shifted unprofitable services to local private operators (e.g., Kanachu, Tokyu Bus, Keikyu Bus), and introduced temporary subsidized transit schemes.

=== 2010s to Present: Terminal Realignment ===
Yokohama Station West Exit (2017): In response to severe curb congestion from incoming tourist charter buses, the West Exit terminal was reconfigured. Former municipal bus stops in front of the Nomura Securities building were converted into dedicated, reservation-only charter bays, while scheduled city bus boarding areas relocated to newly installed shelters fronting the Tenri Building.

== Summary ==
The buses are colored cream with blue lines. In addition to routes within Yokohama City, there are also buses that originate from and terminate at Kawasaki Station. However, within Yokohama City, there are no munipal bus services in the areas of Seya Ward and Sakae Ward. There are mainly operarted by other companies. Aoba Ward, Totsuka Ward, and Kanazawa Ward also have fewer routes, with services mainly provided by other companies. Additionally, in most areas, the routes are same to those operated by other companies.

== Route ==
=== Excursion Route ===
The Akakutsu operates in the Minatomirai and Chinatown areas. The Bayside Blue operates a route between Yokohama Station and Yamashita Pier. The Burari N Route (Route 89) operates from Yokohama Station and Sakuragicho Station to Ipponmatsu Elementary School via Nogeyama Zoo, and the Burari S Route operates from Yokohama Station to Sankei-en on Saturdays and holidays only.

=== Highway bus ===
Thare are two typs of highway bus.

- <109> : Yokohama Station to Daikoku Pier
- <299> : Yokohama Station to MITSUI OUTLET PARK YOKOHAMA Bayside

=== General route ===
- As of August 2024.
- Routes marked EXP. are passing through several stops.

No.	Point of departure	Via	Point of end
1	Nakayama Station		Midori bus depot
2	Kamiōoka Station	Hino	Konan bus Depot
6	Shin-Yokohama Station	Okurayama Station・TRESSA YOKOHAMA	Kajiyama
7	Yokohama Station	Higashi-Kanagawa Station・Oguchidori・Saiseikai Yokohamashi Tobu Hospital	Kawasaki Station
8	Yokohama Station	Motomachi-Chūkagai Station・Kominatobashi・Hommoku・Sankei-en	Hommoku bus Depot
9	Yokohama Station	Hodogaya Station・Idogaya Station・Gymyoji・Okamuracho	Takigashira
9	Hodogaya Station	Idogaya Station・Gumyōji・Okamuracho・Takigashira	Isogo Station
10	Isogo Station	Sugita Station・Kurikicho	Minenosato
12	Nishi sugeta danchi	Kamoi Station・Midori bus depot	Nakayama Station
12	Nishi sugeta danchi	Kamoi Station・Hakusan-chuo	Hakusan senior high school
12	Hakusan senior high school	Hakusan-chuo・Midori bus depot	Nakayama Station
13	Tsurumi Station	Mitsuikemichi・Kami-sueyoshi・Ichinose・Otsunabashi	Tsunashima Station; Shin-Tsunashima Station
13	Tsurumi Station	Mitsuikemichi・Kami-sueyoshi・Ichinose・Otsunabashi・Kohoku word office	Shin-yokohama Station
14	Kajiyama	Mitsuikemichi	Tsurumi Station
15	Tsurumi Station	Mukaicho・Honchodori・Kokudo Station	Tsurumi Station
16	Tsurumi Station	Ichiba・Tsurumi-Sogo Senior High School	Tsurumi Station
17 EXP.	Tsurumi Station	Kokudo Station・Namamugi Station・Daikoku Pier	Tsurumi Station
18	Namamugi	Tsurumi Station・Motomiya・Shitte Station	Yako Station
19	Shin-Koyasu Station	Ebisucho	Namamugi
20	Sakuragichō Station	Nihon-ōdōri Station・Motomachi	Yamate Station
21	Sakuragichō Station	Naka word office・Motomachi・Yamamotocho・Negishi Station (Kanagawa)	Takigashira
22	Hodogaya Station West	Sakuragaoka・Fujimibashi・Wadamachi Station	Hoshikawa Station
23	Aobadai Station	Tokaichiba Station・Yokohama Kirigaoka Post office・Kirigaoka senior high school	Wakabadai-Chuo
23	Aobadai Station	Tokaichiba Station・Niharucho	Miho-Chuo
25	Yokohama Station West	Tennōchō Station・Myojindai・Sakuragaoka	Hodogaya Station West
26	Yokohama Station	Sakuragicho Station・Osanbashi Pier・Yamashita Park・Hommoku Pier	Yokohama Port Symbol Tower
27	Tsurumi Station	Irihunecho	Anzencho
28	Nippa Station	Umedabashi・LaLaPort Yokohama・Ochiaibashi	Nakayama Station North
29	Yokohama Station	Higashi-Kanagawa Station・Oguchidori・Mitsuikemichi	Tsurumi Station
31	Yokohama Station West	Higashi-Kanagawa Station・Hakuraku・Shirahata	Oguchi Station
32	Hodogaya bus depot	Hodogaya Station・Kuboyama・Koganecho Station	Kannai Station
33	Hodogaya Station West	Tennōchō Station・Hoshikawa Station・Hanamidai・Wadamachi Station	Hodogaya Station West
34	Yokohama Station West	Yokohama Municipal Citizen's Hospital・Yokohama Suiran senior high school・Sawartari	Yokohama Station WestYokohama Station West
35	Yokohama Station West	Mitsuzawa Park・Nakamaru・Kandaiji-iriguchi・Soushin woman school・Tammachi Station	Yokohama Station WestYokohama Station West
36	Yokohama Station West	Higashi-Kanagawa Station・Kandaiji・Katakuracho Station・Nishi-Sugeta-Danchi・Kamoi Station	Midori bus depot
38	Yokohama Station West	Higashi-Kanagawa Station・Kikunabashi・Yokohama East senior high school・Higashiterao	Tsurumi Station West
38	Tsurumi Station West	Anyoji・Aradate・Iiyama	Tsurumi Station West
39	Yokohama Station West	Higashi-Kanagawa Station・shinoharaike・kozukue Station・Higashi-Hommgocho・Kamoi Station	Midori bus Depot
41	Tsurumi Station West	Anyoji・Utsuro・Kikuna Station	Shin-Yokohama Station
41	Tsurumi Station West	Anyoji・Utsuro・Kikuna Station・Okurayama Station・Nippa Station・Shinkaibashi	Kawamukocho
41	Shin-Yokohama Station	Okurayama Station・Nippa Station・Shinkaibashi・Yabune・Kainosaka	Nakayama Station North
45	Yokodai Station	Usuki・Enokido	Konandai Station
45	Konandai Station	Shimizu-bashi・Noba-Central-park・Kaminagaya Station	Keikyu NEW TOWN
48	Yokohama Station	Central Market・Chiwakacho	Higashi-Kanagawa Station East
50	Yokohama Station West	Tammachi Station・Soshin Woman School・Kandaiji-Iriguchi・Mitsuzawa-Park	Yokohama Station West
51	Kamioka Station	Konan word office・Suzukage street	Noba-Central-Park
52	Kamioka Station	Konan word office・Noba East	Noba-Central-Park
53	Yokohama Station West terminal 2	Kofukuji・Hodogaya Station・Nagata・Hodogaya Child Amusement Park	Heiwadai
54	Negishi Station	Tateno senior high school・Mitsubishi Hommoku Factory・Hommoku Pier	Negishi Station
55	Aobadai Station	Tokaichiba Station・Nagatsuta-minami・Seisa senior high school	Wakabadai Chuo
56	Kamoi Station		Takeyama Danchi
58	Sakuragi-cho Station	Motomachi-Chūkagai Station・Minato Red-Cross Hospital・Kominatobashi・Hommoku・Makado・Negishi Station・Isogo Station	Isogo Depot
59	Yokohama Station West	Higashi-Kanagawa Station・Urashima-oka・Kikuna Station・Ozonecho・Otsunabashi	Shin-Tsunashima Station
63	Shiomidai store		IHI ship Factory
64	Isogo Station	Shiomidai・Saidobashi・Kamioka Station・Konan word office・Hino	Konandai Station
65	Aobadai Station	Tokaichiba Station・Kirigayato・Kirigaoka senior high school・Wakabadai-minami	Wakabadai Chuo
66 EXP.	Sakuragi-cho Station	Motomachi・Minato Red-Cross Hospital	Hommoku Pier breakwater A
67	Kajiyama	Showa-Sakaue	Tsurumi Station West
68	Yokohama Station West terminal 3	Kofukuji・Kuboyama・Urafunecho・Nakamurabashi	Takigashira
73	Center-Minami Station	Tsuzuki-fureainooka Station・Saedo・Kainosaka・Kawawacho・Kawawa senior high school	Center-Minami Station
74	Nakayama Station North	Yatsutahara	Nakayama Station North
76	Yokodai Station	Hino-Central Park	Konan bus Depot
78	Negishi Station	Takigashira・Okamuracho・Sasabori・Shiomidai	Isogo Station
79	Kannai Station	Bandobashi・Maita Station・Nagata・Hodogaya Child Amusement Park	Heiwadai
80	Center-Minami Station	Hiradai・Kainosaka・Nakayamacho	Nakayama Station North
82	Yokohama Station West	Higashi-Kanagawa Station・Kandaiji・Katakuracho Station	Hattanbashi
84	Higashi-Kanagawa Station	Rokkakubashi・Utsuro・Kaminokicho・Shin-Koyasu Station・Takizaka	Tsurumi Station West
85	Isogo bus Depot	Isogocho・Yokohama Sorth Thermal power station	Yokohama Sorth Sewage treatment plant
86	Yokohama Station	Shinmachi・Koyasu	Namamugi
87	Yokohama Station West	Yokohama Municipal Citizen's Hospital・Mitsuzawa-kamicho Station・Matsumoto	Yokohama Station West
88	Yokohama Municipal Citizen's Hospital	Mitsuzawa-kamicho Station・Matsumoto・Higashi-Kanagawa Station・Kandaiji	Kandaiji-Iriguchi
90	Aobadai Station	Aobadai Tokyu bus Depot・Samya-Midoridai	Nakayama Station North
91 EXP.	Negishi Station		Mitsubishi Hommoku Factory
92 EXP.	Yokohama Station West	Wadamachi・Umenoki	Sasayama Danchi
96	Shin-Yokohama Station	Yokohama Rosai Hospital・Nissan Stadium・Kawamuko-Minamikochi・Otake	Nippa Station
97	Negishi Station	Kamomecho・Mitsubishi Hommoku Factory・Hommoku citizn park	Negishi Station
98	Nakayama Station	Niharucho・Tokaichiba Station・Uenohara	Nagatsuta Station
101	Hodogaya bus Depot	Okanomachi・Sakuragi-cho Station・Yokohama Stadium・Motomachi・Hommoku・Makado	Negishi Station
102	Yokohama Station	Tobe Station・Kuboyama・Urafunecho・Nakamurabashi	Takigashira
103	Yokohama Station	Hinodecho・Isezaki-chōjamachi Station・Yamamotocho	Negishidai
104	Shin-Yokohama Station	Kohoku word office・TRESSA_YOKOHAMA・Mitsuike-park・Sueyoshi	Tsurumi Station West
105	Yokohama Station	Sakuragi-cho Station・Yokohama Stadium・Motomachi・Hommoku	Hommoku Depot
106	Sakaigi junior high school	Gontazasaka・Hodogaya Station・Hamamatsucho・Sakuragi-cho Station・Yokohama Stadium・Motomachi・Hommoku	Hommoku Depot
107	Yokodai Station	Kami-Nakazotobashi・Kami-Nakazatocho・Kami-Nakazatocho	Yokodai Station
108	Konandai Station		Konan bus depot
109 EXP.	Yokohama Station	Yokohama city hall north PLAZA・Yamashita pier	Daikoku Pier
111	Kamioka Station	Konan word office・Yoshiwara・Yokodai Station・Enokido	Konandai Station
112	Kaminagaya Station	Suzukage Street・Hino-Central-Park	Yokodai Station
113	Sakuragi-cho Station	Hagoromocho・Yoshinocho Station・Nakamurabashi・Takigashira・Ashinabashi・Isogo Station	Isogo bus Depot
119	Kamoi Station	Hakusan senior high school・Inaridori・Araicho	Kamoi Station
123 EXP	Yokohama Station	Yokohama city hall North PLAZA・Yamashitacho	Nissan Hommoku pier
124	Center-Minami Station	Tsuzuki-fureainooka Station・Ishibashi・LaLaPort Yokohama south・Kamoike-Bridge	Midori Bus Depot; Sasayama Danchi
125	Hoshikawa Station	Daimondori・Hodogaya Station West・Sakuragaoka・Myojindai	Hoshikawa Station
127	Hoshikawa Station	Myojindai・Sakuragaoka・Hodogaya Station West・Daimondori	Hoshikawa Station
128	Tsurumi Station		Yokohama island Garden
129	Shin-Yokohama Station	Hattanbashi・Sanmaibashi・Umenoki・Nishiya Station	Tsurugamine Station
130	Kaminagaya Station	Tenya-Bridge・Noba Central-Park・Kanaiya	Konan Bus Depot
133	Kamioka Station	Okamuracho・Yokohama City Tram museum	Negishi Station
135	Negishi Station	Babacho・Yokohama Brain and Spine Center・Takigashira	Negishi Station
136	Nakayaa Station	Nakayamacho・Sakai	Yokohama Zoo
155	Tsurumi Station		Yokohamashi Tobu Hospital
156	Pacifico Yokohama	sakuragi-cho Station・Hatsunecho・Nakamurabashi	Takigashira
158	Sakuragi-cho Station	Naka word office・Azumabashi・Urahunecho・Tenjinbashi	Takigashira
168	Yokohama Station	Pia Arena MM・Yokohama city hall north PLAZA・Motomachi-Chūkagai Station・Kominatobashi・Hommoku・Sankei-en	Hommoku bus Depot
172	Kamoi Station	Araicho・Nishiya Station・Umenoki・Sasayama Danchi・Takeyama Danchi	Kamoi Station
177	Tokaichiba Station	Onda・Kodomonokuni・Naracho	Nara-Kita-Danchi
181	Tsurumi Station	Kokudo Station・Myojinmae・Daikokucho	Yokohama Suger Factory
188	Kaminagaya Station	Tenya-Bridge・Noba Sports Center・Noba area PLAZA	Kaminagaya Station
199	Heiwadai	Nagata・Maita Station・Urafunecho・Kannai Station・Koganecho・Maita Station・Nagata	Heiwadai
201	Yokohama Station West	Matsumoto・Mitsuzawa-Kamicho Station・Okazawacho・Yokohama National University・Wadamachi・Kofukuji	Yokohama Station West
202	Yokohama Station West	Kofukuji・Wadamachi・Okazawa-shita・Mitsuzawa・Matsumoto	Yokohama Station West
204	Yokohama Station West		Sengencho Bus Depot
205	Nakayama Station	Niharucho・Tokaichiba Meeting center・Kirigayato・Kirigaoka senior high school	Wakabadai Chuo
207	Yokohama Station West	Kofukuji	Hodogaya bus Depot
208	Yokohama Station West	Kofukuji・Wadamachi・Okazawa-shita・Mitsuzawa-Park・Yokohama Municipal Citizen's Hospital	Yokohama Station West
209	Yokohama Station West	Yokohama Municipal Citizen's Hospital・Okazawacho・Wadamachi・Kofukuji	Yokohama Station West
210	Higashi-Totsuka Station	Sakaigi junior high school・Hirado	Higashi-Totsuka Station
211	Tsurugamine Station	Shimo-Shirane Bridge	Fukujuso
212	Hodogaya bus Depot	Suidomichi・Hodogaya Station・Setogaya	Hodogaya Station
213	Shin-Koyasu Station	Irie・Oguchi・Nishi-Terao	Shin-Koyasu Station
214	Higashi-Totsuka Station	Sakaigi Honcho・Sakaigi junior high school	Higashi-Totsuka Station
215	Shin-Sugita Station	Sugita Tsubonomi chuo・Sugitadai・Sugita-Bairin	Shin-Sugita Station
217	Konandai Station		Hino-Chuo
218	Fukujuso	Nishiya Station・Umenoki	Arai Junior high school
219	Gumyoji	Okamura-nishi	Mitsugaoka-Chuo
220	Hodogaya Station West	Daimon-dori・Hoshikawa Station・Wadamachi Station・Bukkou-Mukaihara・Bukkou-Harasaka	Wadamachi Station
221	Kamoi Station	Makino memorial hospital・Higashi-Hongo	Higashi-Hongo area care PLAZA
222	Yamate Station	Midorigaoka・Hommoku-Wada・Wadasan-guchi	Yamate Station
240	Nakayama Station	Morinodai・Daimuracho	Nakayama Station
248	Semmarudai Meeting PLAZA	Semmarudai Danchi・Nishiya Station・Umenoki	Sasayama Danchi
256	Kamoi Station	Takeyama Danchi・Sasayama Danchi・Umenoki・Nishiya Station・Inaridori・Araicho	Kamoi Station
260	Higashi-Totsuka Station	Sakaigi Junior high school・Gontasakaue	Heiwai
272	Tokaichiba Station	Tokaichiba Meeting-PLAZa	Tokaichiba Station
275	Nakayama Station	Kamiyamacho Park・Hakusan Street	Nakayama Station
288 EXP.	Seirei Yokohama Hospital	Hodogaya Station	Seirei Yokohama Hospital
291	Yokohama Station West terminal 3	Mitsuzawa-Park・Katakuracho Station・Kishine Park Sorth・Kikunabashi	Oguchi Station
292	Sengencho bus Depot	Okanomachi・Nishi-Hiranuma-Bridge・Tobe-Honcho・Hinodecho・Sakuragi-cho Station	Pacifico Yokohama
293	Isogo Station	Sugita Station・Kurikicho・Kami-Nakazatocho・Isogodai-Danchi	Isogo Station
295	Shin-Yokohama Station	Sanomori-Park・Saruwatari	Nishi-Sugeta-Danchi
300	Shin-Yokohama Station	Yokohama Rosai hospital・Nissan Stadium・Kawamuko-Minamikochi・Shinkasibashi	Nakamachidai Station
301	Nakamachidai Station	Hiradai・Ikeda	Eda Station
302	Nakamachidai Station	Kohoku industry area・Kita-shinkawabashi・Higashi-Yamata Station・Kachita	Center-Minami Station
304	Eda Station	Eda senior high school・Mizukigaoka	Center-Minami Station
305	Ichigao Station	Izumi-tamukai・Mihanayama・Ishibashi・Kainosaka	Nakayama Station North
306	Ichigao Station	Izumi-tamukai・Tsuzuki-fureainooka Station	Cemter-Minami Station
318	Nakamachidai Station	Orimoto-Kita・Tsuzuki Sports Center・Hoshigaya	Tsuzuki-fureainooka Station
321	MITSUI OUTLET PARK YOKOHAMA Bayside	Mokuzai-port・Tomioka・Nokendai Station・Idaine-Park・Tomioka East Junior high school	MITSUI OUTLET PARK YOKOHAMA Bayside
326 EXP.	Midori bus Depot	Kamoi Station・Nishi-Sugeta-Danchi・Katakuracho Station・Kandaiji	Yokohama Station West
327 EXP.	Sakuragi-cho Station	Hagoromocho・Yoshinocho Station・Nakamurabashi・Takigashira・Ashinabashi・Isogo Station	Isogo bus Depot
328 EXP.	Hommoku bus Depot	Hommoku・Motomachi・Sakuragi-cho Station	Yokohama Station
329 EXP.	Yokohama Station West	Mitsuzawa-Kamicho Station・Okazawacho	Yokohama National University
345 EXP.	Aobadai Station	Tokaichiba Station・Seisa senior high school	Wakabadai Chuo
346 EXP.	Kandaiji-iriguchi	Soushin woman school	Yokohama Station West

== Routes operated in the past ==
- As of March 2007.
- Routes marked EXP. are passing through several stops.

No.	Point of departure	Via	Point of end
1	Nakayama Station	Midori bus depot・Kamisugetacho・Umenoki・Kamihoshikawa・Kofukuji	Yokohama Station West
1	Nakayama Station	Midori bus depot・Kamoicho	Takeyama Danchi
2	Minato red cross hospital	Motomachi-Chūkagai StationYoshinocho Station・Kamiōoka Station・Hino	Konan bus Depot
3	Yokohama Station West terminal2	Higashi-Kanagawa Station・Shinoharaike・kozukue Station・Umedabashi・Kainosaka	Ichigao Station
3	Shin-Yokohama Station	kozukue Station・Umedabashi・Kainosaka	Ichigao Station
4	Isogo Station	Tomioka・Yatsuzaka・Kanazawa-Bunko	Oppama-Tenjinbashi
5	Yokohama Station	Wadamachi・Umenoki・Nishiya Station・Tsurugamine Station・Onukibashi	Kamenoko; Wakabadai Chuo
5	Yokohama Station	Kofukiji	Hodogaya bus Depot
5	Yokohama Station	Wadamachi・Umenoki・Nishiya Station・Tsurugamine Station・Imashuku	Yokohama Zoo
7	Yokohama Station	Higashi-Kanagawa Station・Oguchidori・Mitsuikemichi	Kawasaki Station
8	Yokohama Station	Motomachi-Chūkagai Station・Kominatobashi・Hommoku・Sankei-en	Hommoku bus Depot
9	Yokohama Station	Hodogaya Station・Idogaya Station・Gymyoji・Okamuracho	Takigashira
9	Fujidana	Hodogaya Station・Idogaya Station・Gumyōji・Okamuracho・Takigashira	Isogo Station
10	Yokohama city tram museum	Isogo Station・Sugita Station・Kurikicho	Minenosato
11	Sakuragichō Station	Yamachitacho・Harbor View Park・Uchikoshibashi・Nakamurabashi・Maita Station・Idogaya Station	Hodogaya Station
12	Nishi sugeta danchi	Kamoi Station・Hakusan-chuo	Hakusan senior high school
12	Kamoi Station	Kamoi Station・Hakusan-chuo	Nakayama Station
12	Hakusan senior high school	Hakusan-chuo・Midori bus depot	Nakayama Station
13	Tsurumi Station	Mitsuikemichi・Kami-sueyoshi・Ichinose・Otsunabashi	Tsunashima Station; Shin-Yokohama Station
14	Kajiyama	Mitsuikemichi・Tsurumi Station・Takizaka	Shin-Koyasu Station
15	Tsurumi Station	Mukaicho・Honchodori・Kokudo Station	Tsurumi Station
16	Tsurumi Station	Ichiba・Tsurumi-Sogo Senior High School	Tsurumi Station
17	Tsurumi Station	Kokudo Station・Myojinmae・Daikoku Pier	Tsurumi Station
17	Tsurumi Station	Kokudo Station・Myojinmae・Daikokucho	Yokohama Suger Factory
18	Namamugi	Tsurumi Station・Motomiya・Egasaki・Shitte Station	Yako Station
19	Shin-Koyasu Station	Ebisucho	Namamugi
19	Shin-Koyasu Station	Ebisucho・Myojinmae・Kokudo Station	Tsurumi Station
20	Yamashita Pier	Motomachi	Yamate Station
21	Sakuragicho Station	Naka word office・Motomachi・Yamamotocho・Negishi Station (Kanagawa)	Takigashira
22	Hodogaya Station West	Sakuragaoka・Fujimibashi・Wadamachi Station	Hoshikawa Station
23	Aobadai Station	Tokaichiba Station・Yokohama Kirigaoka Post office・Kirigaoka senior high school	Wakabadai-Chuo
23	Aobadai Station	Tokaichiba Station・Niharucho	Miho-Chuo
23	Nakayama Station	Niharucho・Tokaichiba Station・Uenohara・Nagatsuta Station・Onda・Kodomonokuni・Naracho	Nara-Kita danchi
23	Nakayama Station	Niharucho・Tokaichiba Station・Yokohama Kirigaoka Post office・Kirigaoka senior high school	Wakabadai-Chuo
23	Tokaichiba Station	Onda・Kodomonokuni・Naracho	Nara-Kita-Danchi
24	Yokohama Station West	Rokkakubashi・Utsuro・Kaminokicho・Shin-Koyasu Station	Namamugi
25	Yokohama Station West	Tennōchō Station・Myojindai・Sakuragaoka	Hodogaya Station West
25	Hodogaya Station	Daimondori・Myojindai・Sakuragaoka	Hodogaya Station West
26	Yokohama Station	Sakuragicho Station・Osanbashi Pier・Yamashita Park・Hommoku Pier	Yokohama Port Symbol Tower
27	Tsurumi Station	Irihunecho	Anzencho
28	Heiwadai	Gontasaka・Hodogaya Station・Suidomichi・Kofukuji	Hodoogaya bus Depot
29	Yokohama Station	Higashi-Kanagawa Station・Oguchidori・Mitsuikemichi	Tsurumi Station
31	Yokohama Station West	Higashi-Kanagawa Station・Hakuraku・Shirahata・Oguchi Station・Oguchidori	Yokohama Station West
32	Hodogaya bus depot	Hodogaya Station・Kuboyama・Koganecho Station	Yokohama city hall
33	Ichigao Station	Izumitamukai・Yunokiyato・Azamino Station	Tama-plaza Station
34	Yokohama Station West	Yokohama Suiran senior high school・Sawartari	Yokohama Station WestYokohama Station West
35	Yokohama Station West	Mitsuzawa Park・Nakamaru・Kandaiji-iriguchi・Soushin woman school・Tammachi Station	Yokohama Station WestYokohama Station West
36	Yokohama Station West	Higashi-Kanagawa Station・Kandaiji・Katakuracho Station・Nishi-Sugeta-Danchi・Kamoi Station	Midori bus depot
38	Yokohama Station West	Mitsuzawa Nutional Ground・Katakuracho Station・Yokohama East senior high school・Higashiterao	Tsurumi Station West
38	Tsurumi Station West	Anyoji・Aradate・Iiyama	Tsurumi Station West
39	Yokohama Station West	Higashi-Kanagawa Station・shinoharaike・kozukue Station・Higashi-Hommgocho・Kamoi Station・Midori bus Dept	Nakayama Station
40	Nagatsuta Station	Genkaida・Kirigaoka senior high school・Wakabadai south	Wakabadai chuo
41	Tsurumi Station West	Anyoji・Utsuro・Kikuna Station	Shin-Yokohama Station
41	Tsurumi Station West	Anyoji・Utsuro・Kikuna Station・Okurayama Station・Nippa Station・Shinkaibashi	Kawamukocho
41	Tsurumi Station West	Anyoji・Utsuro・Kikuna Station・Okurayama Station・Nippa Station・Shinkaibashi	LaLaPort Yokohama
41	Shin-Yokohama Station	Okurayama Station・Nippa Station・Shinkaibashi・Yabune・Ochiaibashi	Nakayama Station North
41	Kawamukocho	Suijinmae・Yabune・Ochiaibashi	Nakayama Station North
41	Kawamukocho	kozukue Station	Shin-Yokohama Station
42	Ichinose	Sueyoshi・Tsurumi Station・Kokudo Station	Shioiricho
44	Yokohama Station West	Mitsuzawa Park・Sammaicho・Tenya・Hattanbashi・Sammaicho・Mitsuzawa Park	Yokohama Station West
45	Yokodai Station	Usuki・Enokido	Konandai Station
45	Konandai Station	Shimizu-bashi・Noba-Central-park・Kaminagaya Station	Keikyu NEW TOWN
46	Higashi-Kawanagawa Station Eat	Chiwakocho	Yokohama North Dock
47	Hodogaya Depot	Hamamatsucho・Fujidana・Hamamatsucho・Tobe Station・Hinodecho	Sakuragicho Station
48	Yokohama Station	Central Market・COTTON HARBOR	Yokohama Station
50	Yokohama Station West	Tammachi Station・Soshin Woman School・Kandaiji-Iriguchi・Mitsuzawa-Park	Yokohama Station West
51	Kamioka Station	Konan word office・Suzukage street	Noba-Central-Park
52	Kamioka Station	Konan word office・Noba East	Noba-Central-Park
53	Yokohama Station West terminal 2	Kofukuji・Hodogaya Station・Nagata・Hodogaya Child Amusement Park	Heiwadai
54	Negishi Station	Tateno senior high school・Mitsubishi Hommoku Factory・Hommoku Pier	Negishi Station
55	Aobadai Station	Tokaichiba Station・Nagatsuta-minami・Seisa senior high school	Wakabadai Chuo
56	Kamoi Station		Takeyama Danchi
57	Sakuragicho Station		Pacifico Yokohama
58	Yokohama Station	Sakuragi-cho Station・Motomachi-Chūkagai Station・Minato Red-Cross Hospital・Kominatobashi・Hommoku・Makado・Negishi Station・Isogo Station	Isogo Depot
59	Yokohama Station West	Higashi-Kanagawa Station・Urashima-oka・Kikuna Station・Ozonecho・Otsunabashi	Tsunashima Station
60	Isogo bus Depot	Isogo Station・Isogodai・Sasabori・Gumyoji	Maita junior high school
61	Isogo Station	Shin-Sugita Station	Torihamacho
61	Shin-Sugita Station	Mokuzai-port・Tomioka bus terminal	Linetsu Kanazawa
61	Shin-Sugita Station	Mokuzai-port・Tomioka bus terminal・Namiki chuo	Kanazawa industry area
61	Shin-Sugita Station	Mokuzai-port・Tomioka bus terminal・Namiki chuo・Igaine park・Sachiura	Shin-Sugita Station
62 EXP.	Yokohama Station West	Wadamachi・Umenoki・Nishiya Station	Senmarudai Danchi
63	Yokodai 1chome		IHI ship Factory
64	Isogo Station	Shiomidai・Saidobashi・Kamioka Station・Konan word office・Hino	Konandai Station
65	Aobadai Station	Tokaichiba Station・Kirigayato・Kirigaoka senior high school・Wakabadai-minami	Wakabadai Chuo
67	Kajiyama	Showa-Sakaue	Tsurumi Station West
68	Yokohama Station West terminal 3	Kofukuji・Kuboyama・Urafunecho・Nakamurabashi	Takigashira
70	Isogo Station	Shiomidai store・Kuraki park・Hama elementary school・Shiomidai Store	Isogo Station
72	Egasaki	Sueyoshibashi	Tsurumi Station West
73	Center-Minami Station	Hanamidai・Kawawacho・Saedo・Kainosaka	Nakayama Station
74	Nakayama Station North	Yatsutahara	Nakayama Station North
75	Tsurugamine Station South	Kunugidai Danchi	Kunugidai Senior citizens' home
78	Negishi Station	Takigashira・Okamuracho・Sasabori・Shiomidai	Isogo Station
79	Yokohama city hall	Bandobashi・Maita Station・Nagata・Hodogaya Child Amusement Park	Heiwadai
80	Center-Minami Station	Hiradai・Kainosaka	Nakayama Station North
81	Yokohama Station West	Mitsuzawa Park・Daimaru・Katakuracho Station・Saruwatari・Nishi-Sugeta-Danchi	Sugetacho
82	Yokohama Station West	Higashi-Kanagawa Station・Kandaiji・Katakuracho Station	Hattanbashi
82	Yokohama Station West	Higashi-Kanagawa Station・Kandaiji	Kandaiji・Iriguchi
83	Yokohama Station West	Mitsuzawa Park・Katakuracho Iriguchi・Sammaicho	Asahi Garass
83	Yokohama Station West	Kofukuji・Wadamachi・Umenoki	Asahi Garass
85	Isogo bus Depot	Isogocho・Yokohama Sorth Thermal power station	Yokohama Sorth Sewage treatment plant
86	Yokohama Station	Shinmachi・Koyasu	Namamugi
87	Yokohama Station West	Yokohama Municipal Citizen's Hospital・Mitsuzawa-kamicho Station・Matsumoto	Yokohama Station West
88	Dochu-Sakashita	Kachita・Nakamachidai Station・Hiradai	Center-Minami Station
89	Yokohama Station	Yukimibashi・Sakuragicho・Nogeyama Zoo	Ipponmatsu elementary school
90	Aobadai Station	Aobadai Tokyu bus Depot・Samya-Midoridai	Nakayama Station North
91 EXP.	Negishi Station		Mitsubishi Hommoku Factory
92 EXP.	Yokohama Station West	Wadamachi・Umenoki	Sasayama Danchi
93	Yokohama City tram museum	Isogo Station・Sugita Station・Kurikicho・Kami-Nakazatocho・Isogodai-Danchi・Kami-Nakazatocho・Kurikicho・Isogo Station	Yokohama City tram museum
94	Tomioka bus terminal	Keisanji・Tomioka・Yatsuzaka・Kanazawa-bunko	Kanazawa ward office
95 EXP.	Yokohama Station West	Mitsuzawa national ground・Daisan-Keihin・Shinkaibashi・Kawawacho	Ichigao Station
96	Yokohama Station West terminal2	Higashi-Kanagawa Station・Rokkakubashi-Kitamachi	Hattanbashi
97	Negishi Station	Kamomecho・Mitsubishi Hommoku Factory・Hommoku citizn park	Negishi Station
99	Sakuragicho Station	Yokohama Studium・Motomachi・Mugitacho・Makado・Negishi Station・Haramachi	Isogo bus Depot
100	Shin-Sugita Station	Sugita-Tsubonom-Chuo・Kaminakazatocho・Shimogaya	Yokodai Station
101	Hodogaya bus Depot	Okanomachi・Sakuragi-cho Station・Yokohama Stadium・Motomachi・Hommoku・Makado	Negishi Station
102	Yokohama Station	Tobe Station・Kuboyama・Urafunecho・Nakamurabashi	Takigashira
103	Yokohama Station	Hinodecho・Isezaki-chōjamachi Station・Yamamotocho	Negishidai
104	Shin-Yokohama Station	Kohoku word office・TRESSA_YOKOHAMA・Mitsuike-park・Sueyoshi	Tsurumi Station West
105	Yokohama Station	Sakuragi-cho Station・Yokohama Stadium・Motomachi・Hommoku	Hommoku Depot
106	Sakaigi junior high school	Gontazasaka・Hodogaya Station・Hamamatsucho・Sakuragi-cho Station・Yokohama Stadium]]・Motomachi・Hommoku	Hommoku Depot
107	Yokodai Station	Kami-Nakazotobashi・Kami-Nakazatocho・Kami-Nakazatocho	Yokodai Station
109	Yokohama Stetion West terminal2	hayway	Daikoku Pier
109	Sakuragicho Station	Honcho-4・Yamasita Pier	Daikoku Pier
110	Yokohama Station	Sakuragicho Station・Chojamachi・Urahunecho・Takigashira・Ashinabashi・Isogo Station	Sugita-Tenjinbashi
111	Kamioka Station	Konan word office・Yoshiwara・Yokodai Station・Enokido	Konandai Station
112	Kaminagaya Station	Suzukage Street・Hino-Central-Park	Yokodai Station
113	Sakuragi-cho Station	Hagoromocho・Yoshinocho Station・Nakamurabashi・Takigashira・Ashinabashi・Isogo Station	Isogo bus Depot
114	Yokohama Station West	Mitsuzawa-park・Yokohama Citizen hospital・Mitsuzawa・Tammachi Station	Higashi-Kanagawa Station
115	Tsurugamine Station	Onukibashi	Kamenoko; Wakabadai Chuo
115	Tsurugamine Station		Kamishirane housing
115	Tsurugamine Station	Imashuku	Yokohama Zoo
116	Mitsukyo Station	Yazashicho・Kawaicho・Onukibashi	Wakabadai-Chuo
117	Shin-Sugita Station	Mokuzai-port	Mitsubiashi Kanazawa Factory
118	Aobadai Station	Sumiyoshidai・Kodomonokuni・Naracho	Nara-kita-Danchi
118	Aobadai Station	Sumiyoshidai・Kodomonokuni・Midoriyama・Kodomonokuni・Sumiyoshidai	Aobadai Station
119	Kamoi Station	Hakusan senior high school・Inaridori・Araicho	Kamoi Station
119	Kamoi Station	Araicho・Inaridori・Nishiya Station・Umenoki・Wadamachi	Mine elementary school
120	Shin-Yokohama Station	Kojinzakai・Nishi-Sugeta-Danchi	Sugetacho
121	Shin-Yokohama Station	Hattanbashi・Hazawacho・Ikenotanito・Kamihoshikawa	Hodogaya bus Depot
122	Higashi-Kanagawa Station East	Tecno-Wave	Higashi-Kanagawa Station East
124	Center-Minami Station	Tsuzuki-fureainooka Station・Ishibashi・LaLaPort Yokohama south・Kamoike-Bridge	Midori Bus Depot; Sasayama Danchi
126	Negishi Station	Makado・Hommoku Pier・Nissan factory	Negishi Station
128	Tsurumi Station		Yokohama island Garden
129	Shin-Yokohama Station	Hattanbashi・Sanmaibashi・Umenoki・Nishiya Station	Tsurugamine Station
130	Kaminagaya Station	Tenya-Bridge・Noba Central-Park・Kanaiya	Konan Bus Depot
133	Kamioka Station	Okamuracho・Yokohama City Tram museum	Negishi Station
134	Sakuragicho Station	Mugitacho・Minato Red Cross hospital・Kominato・Sankei-en	Hommoku Depot
135	Negishi Station	Babacho・Yokohama Brain and Spine Center・Takigashira	Neghisi Station
136	Nakayaa Station	Nakayamacho・Sakai	Yokohama Zoo
148 EXP.	Yokohama Station	Sakuragicho Station・Kominatobashi・Hommoku・Sankei-en	Hommoku Depot
156	Pacifico Yokohama	sakuragi-cho Station・Hatsunecho・Nakamurabashi	Takigashira
158	Sakuragi-cho Station	Naka word office・Azumabashi・Urahunecho・Tenjinbashi	Takigashira
163	Hinodecho Station	Sakuragicho Station・Minatomirai-Odori・Keiyu hospital・Red renga warehouse・Sakuragiho Station	Hinodecho Station
164	Yokohama Station	Minatomirai-Odori・Pasiffico Yokohama	Red renga warehouse
201	Yokohama Station West	Matsumoto・Mitsuzawa-Kamicho Station・Okazawacho・Yokohama National University・Wadamachi・Kofukuji	Yokohama Station West
202	Yokohama Station West	Kofukuji・Wadamachi・Okazawa-shita・Mitsuzawa・Matsumoto	Yokohama Station West
204	Yokohama Station West		Sengencho Bus Depot
210	Higashi-Totsuka Station	Sakaigi junior high school・Hirado	Higashi-Totsuka Station
211	Tsurugamine Station	Shimo-Shirane Bridge	Fukujuso
212	Hodogaya bus Depot	Suidomichi・Hodogaya Station・Setogaya	Hodogaya Station
213	Shin-Koyasu Station	Irie・Oguchi・Nishi-Terao	Shin-Koyasu Station
215	Shin-Sugita Station	Sugita Tsubonomi chuo・Sugitadai・Sugita-Bairin	Shin-Sugita Station
218	Fukujuso	Nishiya Station・Umenoki	Arai Junior high school
219	Gumyoji	Okamura	Gumyoji
221	Kamoi Station	Makino memorial hospital・Higashi-Hongo	Higashi-Hongo area care PLAZA
222	Yamate Station	Midorigaoka・Hommoku-Wada・Wadasan-guchi	Yamate Station
270	Sakuragicho Station	Isecho・Nishi Ward office・Fujidana・Nogezaka	Sakuragicho Station
300	Shin-Yokohama Station	Yokohama Rosai hospital・Nissan Stadium・Kawamuko-Minamikochi・Shinkasibashi	Nakamachidai Station
301	Nakamachidai Station	Hiradai・Ikeda	Eda Station
302	Kohoku New town Bus Depot	Nakamachidai Station・Kohoku industry area・Kita-shinkawabashi・Center-Kita Station・Center-Minami Station	Kohoku New town Bus Depot
303	Center-Minami Station	Nakamaru・Nakamachidai Station・Kachita	Shin-Kitakawabashi
304	Eda Station	Eda senior high school・Mizukigaoka	
305	Ichigao Station	Izumi-tamukai・Mihanayama・Ishibashi・Kainosaka	Nakayama Station North
306	Ichigao Station	Izumi-tamukai・Tsuzuki-fureainooka	Cemter-Minami Station
308	Nakamachidai Station	Orimoto-Kita・Tsuzuki Sports Center・Hoshigaya	Cemter-Minami Station
310	Nakamachidai Station	Shinkaiwashi・Saedo・Kainosaka・Kawawacho	Cemter-Minami Station

== See also ==
- Yokohama
