= Wadamachi Station =

Railway station in Yokohama, Japan

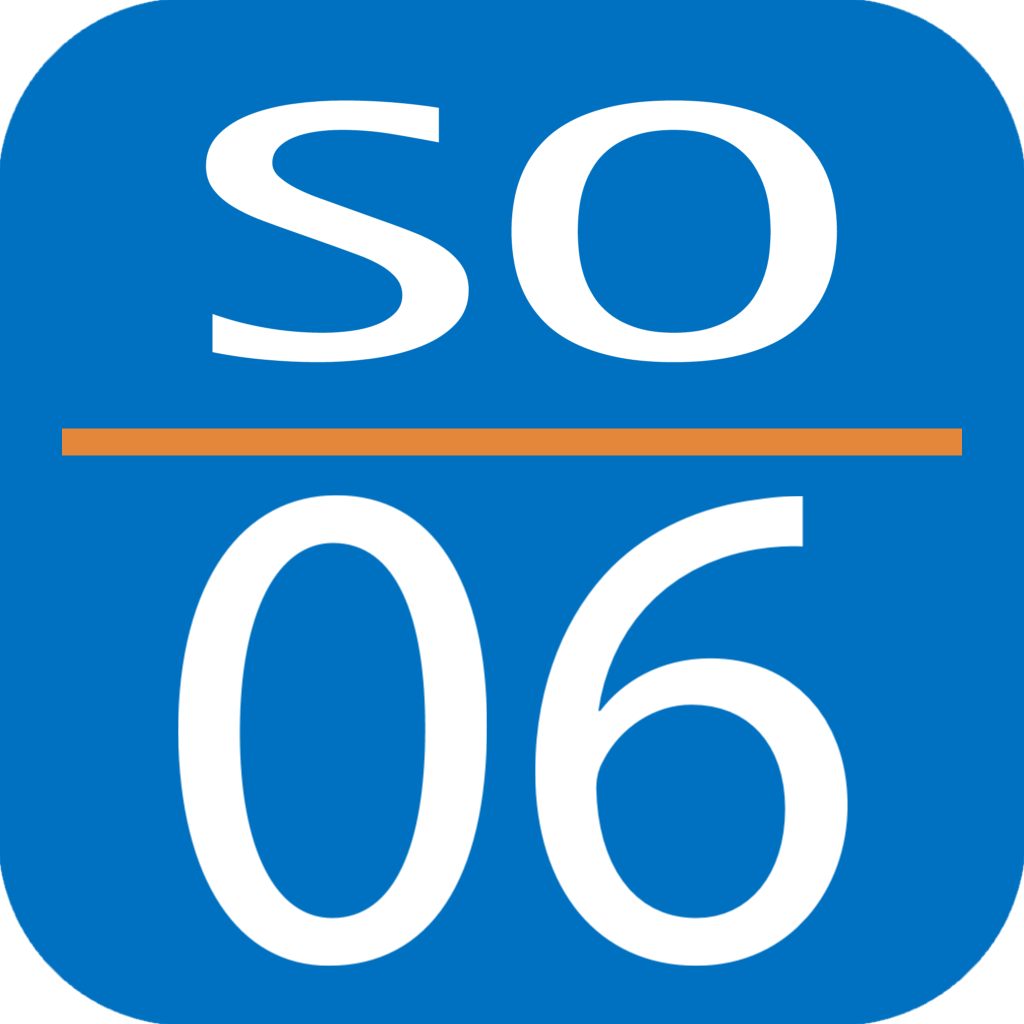
Wadamachi Station 和田町駅

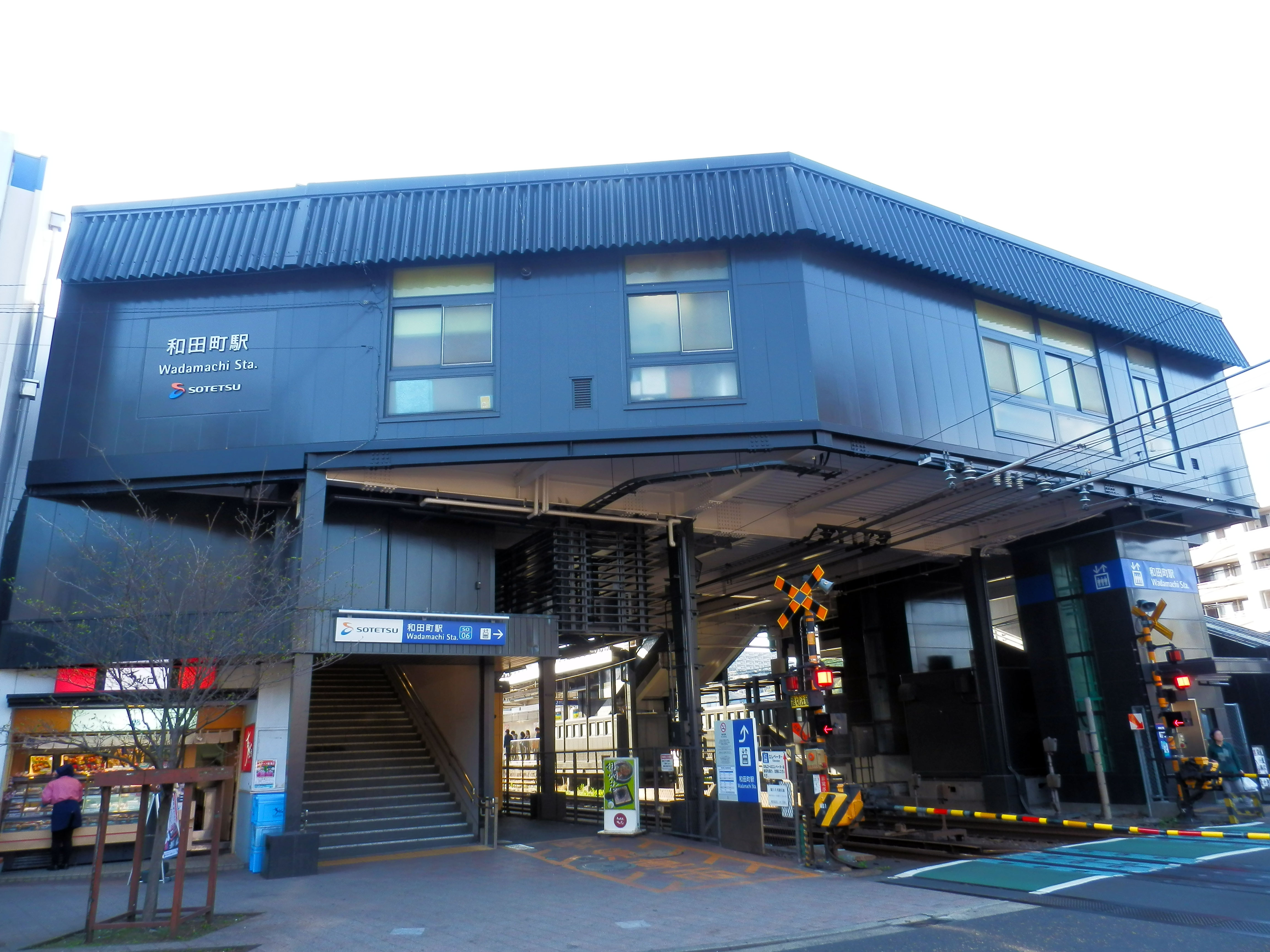
- Wadamachi Station, April 2017

General information
- Location: Bukkō-chō 4, Hodogaya-ku, Yokohama-shi, Kanagawa-ken 240-0044; Japan
- Coordinates: 35.463785°N 139.586518°E
- Operator: Sagami Railway
- Line: Sotetsu Main Line
- Distance: 4.3 km from Yokohama
- Platforms: 2 side platforms

Other information
- Station code: SO06
- Website: Official website

History
- Opened: August 15, 1952

Passengers
- 2019: 18,017 daily

Services
Preceding station	Sagami Railway	Following station
Kami-Hoshikawa towards Ebina	Sōtetsu Main Line Local	Hoshikawa towards Yokohama
Location
- Location within Kanagawa Prefecture Location within Japan

Wadamachi Station (和田町駅, Wadamachi-eki) is a passenger railway station located in Hodogaya-ku, Yokohama, Japan, operated by the private railway operator Sagami Railway (Sotetsu).

== Lines ==
Wadamachi Station is served by the Sagami Railway Main Line, and lies 4.3 kilometers from the starting point of the line at Yokohama Station.

== Station layout ==
The station consists of two opposed side platforms serving two tracks.

=== Platforms ===
1	■ Sagami Line	for Futamata-gawa • Yamato • Ebina • Izumino Line to Shonandai
2	■ Sagami Line	for Yokohama

== History ==
Wadamachi Stationed opened on August 15, 1952.

== Passenger statistics ==
In fiscal 2019, the station was used by an average of 18,017 passengers daily.

The passenger figures for previous years are as shown below.

Fiscal year	daily average
2005	15,576
2010	16,108
2015	16,417

== Surrounding area ==
- Wadacho Shopping Street
- Yokohama National University Tokiwadai Campus
- Tokiwa Park
- Kanagawa Prefectural Hodogaya Park

== Bus services ==
=== Wadamachi Sta. South Ent. Bus Stop ===
Yokohama Municipal Bus (Shiei), Sagami Railway (Sotetsu)

<浜16>	Yokohama Station West Ent. (Sotetsu)	(Sotetsu)
<22>	Hodogaya Station West Ent. (via Daimondōri)	(Shiei)
<22>	Hodogaya Sta. West Ent. (via Fujimibashi)	(Shiei)
<浜16>	Nishihara Residence (via Ichizawacho)	(Sotetsu)
<浜16>	Tsurugamine Sta. (via Ichizawachō)	(Sotetsu)
<浜19>	Shin-Sakuragaoka Housing Complex (via Ichizawachō)	(Sotetsu)

== See also ==
- List of railway stations in Japan
