= Hoshikawa Station (Kanagawa) =

Railway station in Yokohama, Japan

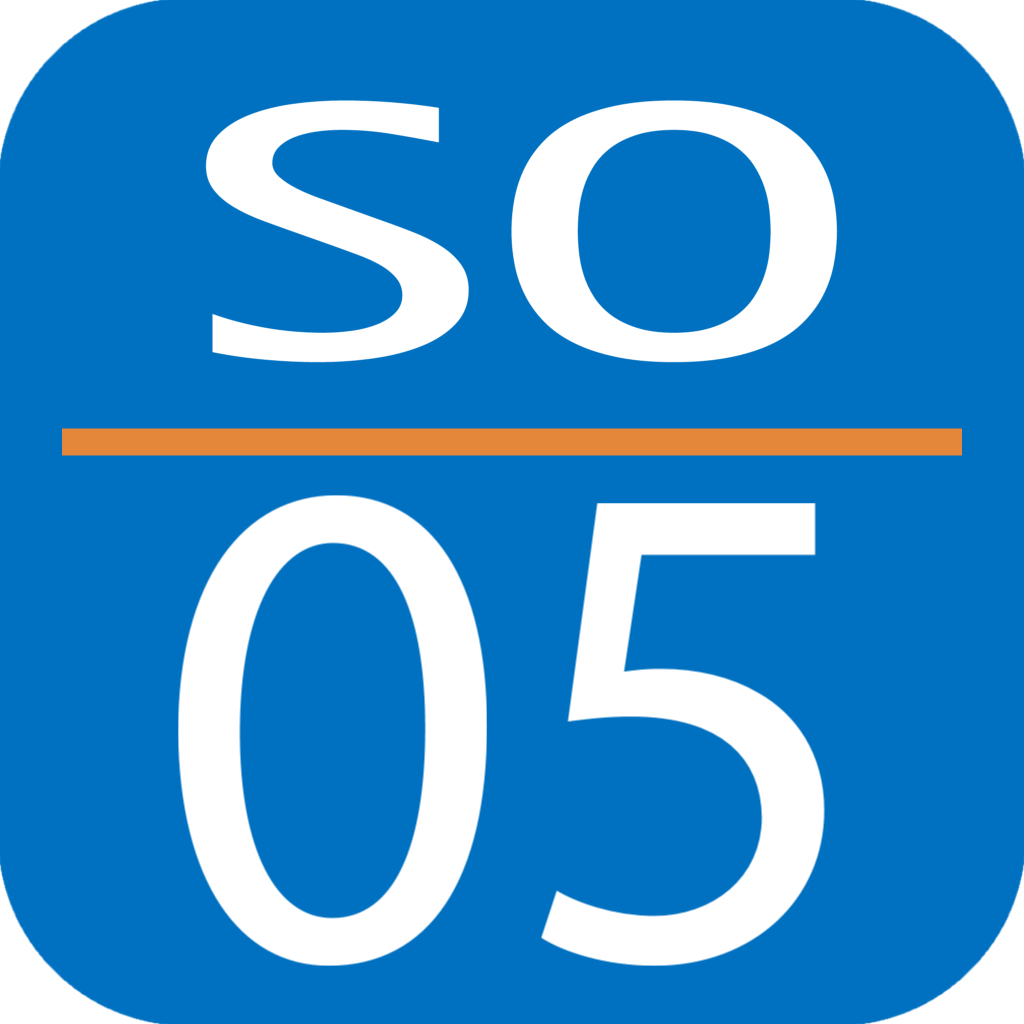
Hoshikawa Station 星川駅

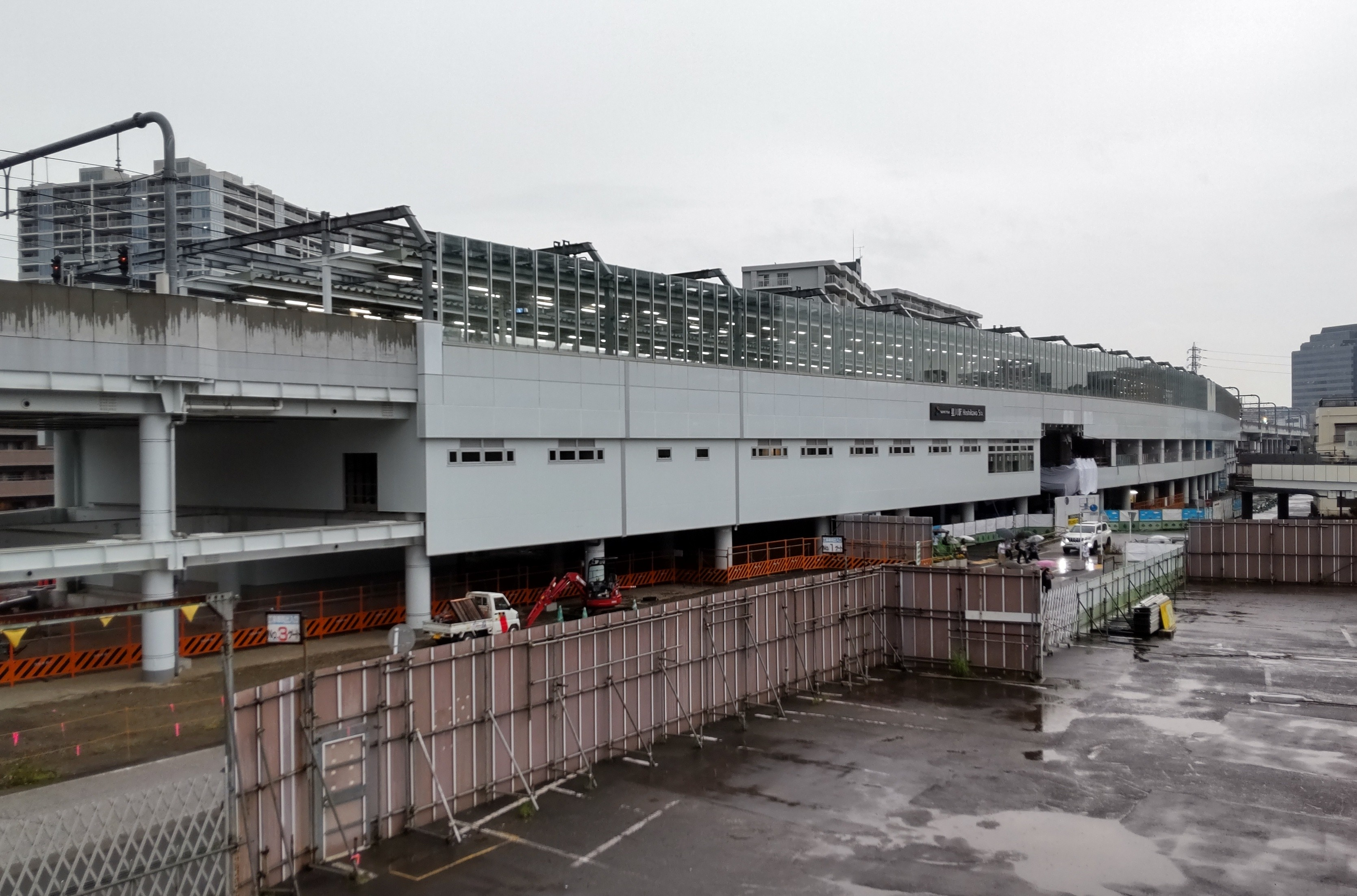
- Hoshikawa Station, July 2021

General information
- Location: 1-chome, Hoshikawa 1-1, Hodogaya-ku, Yokohama-shi, Kanagawa-ken 240-0006; Japan
- Coordinates: 35.458341°N 139.595107°E
- Operator: Sagami Railway
- Line: Sotetsu Main Line
- Distance: 3.3 km from Yokohama
- Platforms: 2 island platforms

Construction
- Structure type: elevated

Other information
- Station code: SO05
- Website: Official website

History
- Opened: March 31, 1927
- Former names: Kita-Hodogaya (until 1931)

Passengers
- 2019: 28,302 daily

Services
Preceding station	Sagami Railway	Following station
Nishiya towards Ebina	Sōtetsu Main Line Rapid	Yokohama Terminus
Wadamachi towards Ebina	Sōtetsu Main Line Local	Tennōchō towards Yokohama
Location
- Location within Kanagawa Prefecture Location within Japan

Hoshikawa Station (星川駅, Hoshikawa-eki) is a passenger railway station located in Hodogaya-ku, Yokohama, Japan, operated by the private railway operator Sagami Railway (Sotetsu).

== Lines ==
Hoshikawa Station is served by the Sagami Railway Main Line, and lies 3.3 kilometers from the starting point of the line at Yokohama Station.

== Station layout ==
The station consists of two island platforms serving four tracks. The station building is elevated and is located above the platforms and tracks.

=== Platforms ===
1, 2	■ Sagami Line	for Futamata-gawa • Yamato • Ebina • Izumino Line to Shonandai
3, 4	■ Sagami Line	for Yokohama

== History ==
Hoshikawa Station opened on March 31, 1927, as Kita-Hodogaya Station (北程ヶ谷駅, Kita-Hodogaya-eki) on the Jinchu Railways, the predecessor to the Sagami Main Line. It was renamed to its present name on April 1, 1933.

== Passenger statistics ==
In fiscal 2019, the station was used by an average of 28,302 passengers daily.

The passenger figures for previous years are as shown below.

Fiscal year	daily average
2005	24,605
2010	27,506
2015	29,366

== Surrounding area ==
- Hodogaya Ward Office (north exit)
- Yokohama Business Park (south exit)

== Bus services ==
North Exit

- Mine shōgakkō mae (峰小学校前) bus stop (5 minutes walking)
- Hodogaya shako-mae (保土ヶ谷車庫前) bus stop (5 minutes walking)

South Exit

- Hoshikawa Station bus stop (in front of the station)
  - Sagami Railway Bus
    - <旭4>Mitatebashi
    - <旭4>Hodogaya Station West Exit (via Daimon-dōri)
- Hoshikawa Station bus stop (3 minutes walking)
  - For the west
    - Yokohama Municipal Bus
      - <22>Hodogaya Station West Exit (via Wadamachi Station)
      - <25>Hodogaya Statien West Exit (via Hanamidai)
    - Sagami Railway Bus
      - <浜16>Nishihara Housing Complex (via Wadamachi Station)
  - For the east
    - Yokohama Municipal Bus
      - <25>Yokohama Station West Exit (via Daimon-dōri)
      - <22, 25>Hodogaya Station West Exit (via Daimon-dōri)
      - <深夜25>Hodogaya Garage mae (via Daimon-dōri)
    - Sagami Railway Bus
      - <浜16>Yokohama Station West Exit (via Daimon-dōri)

== See also ==
- List of railway stations in Japan
