= Kishine-kōen Station =

Metro station in Yokohama, Japan

Coordinates: 35°29′45.75″N 139°37′01.43″E

B24 Kishine-kōen Station 岸根公園駅
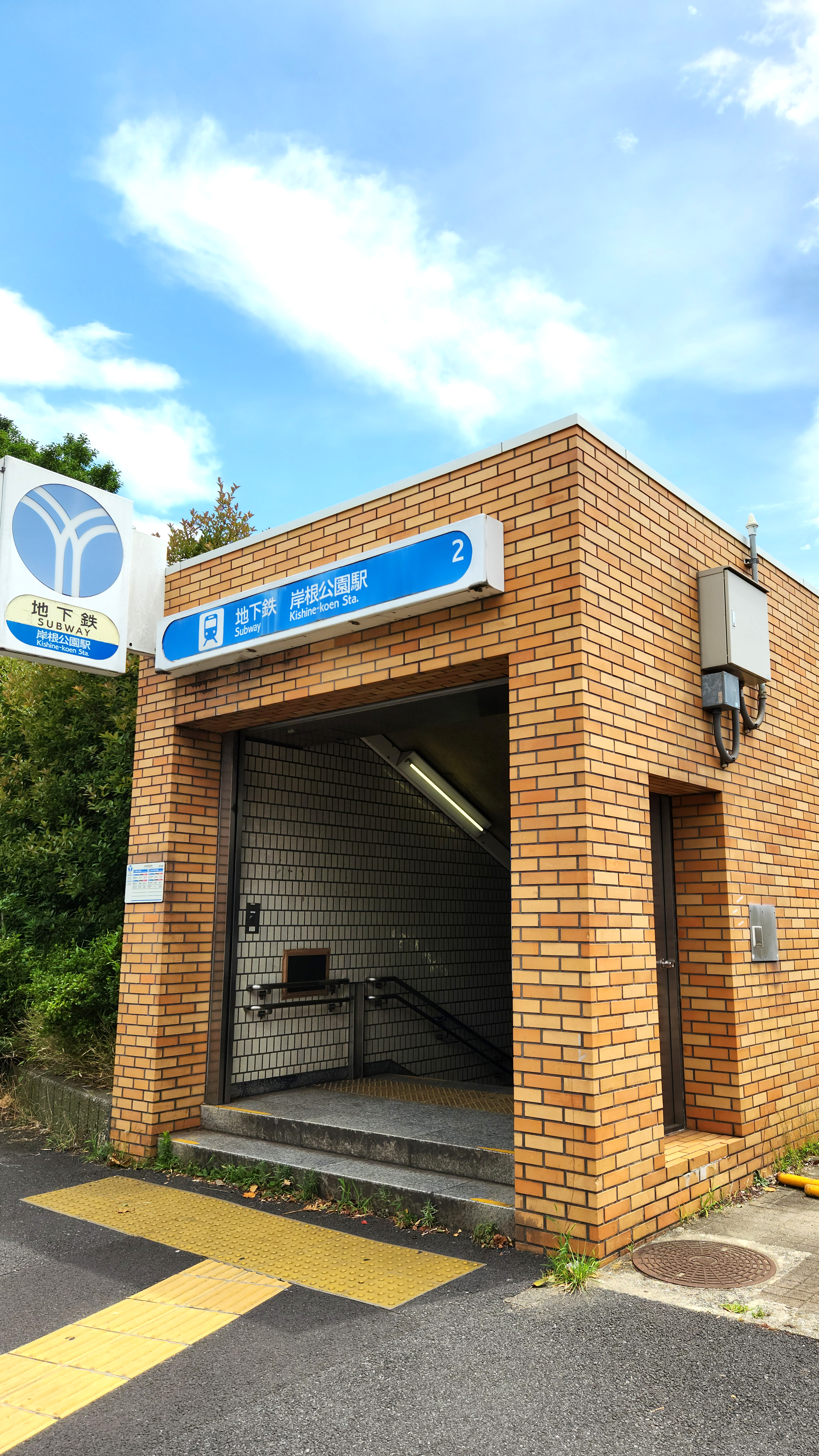
- Entrance No.2 in July 2023

General information
- Location: Shinohara-chō, Kōhoku, Yokohama, Kanagawa （横浜市港北区篠原町字会下谷1123） Japan
- System: Yokohama Municipal Subway station
- Operator: Yokohama City Transportation Bureau
- Line: Blue Line
- Platforms: 2 side platforms
- Tracks: 2

Other information
- Station code: B24

History
- Opened: 14 March 1985; 41 years ago

Passengers
- 2008: 5,296 daily

Services
Preceding station	Yokohama Municipal Subway	Following station
Katakurachō B23 towards Shonandai	Blue Line Local	Shin-Yokohama B25 towards Azamino
Location
- Location within Yokohama Location within Kanagawa Prefecture Location within Japan

Kishine-kōen Station (岸根公園駅, Kishine-kōen-eki) is an underground metro station located in Kōhoku-ku, Yokohama, Kanagawa Prefecture, Japan operated by the Yokohama Municipal Subway’s Blue Line (Line 3). It is 27.9 kilometers from the terminus of the Blue Line at Shōnandai Station.

== Lines ==
- Yokohama Municipal Subway
  - Blue Line

== Station layout ==
Kishine-kōen Station has two opposed side platforms serving two tracks, located three stories underground.

=== Platforms ===
1	■ Blue Line (Yokohama)	Yokohama, Kannai, Totsuka, Shōnandai
2	■ Blue Line (Yokohama)	Shin-Yokohama, Azamino

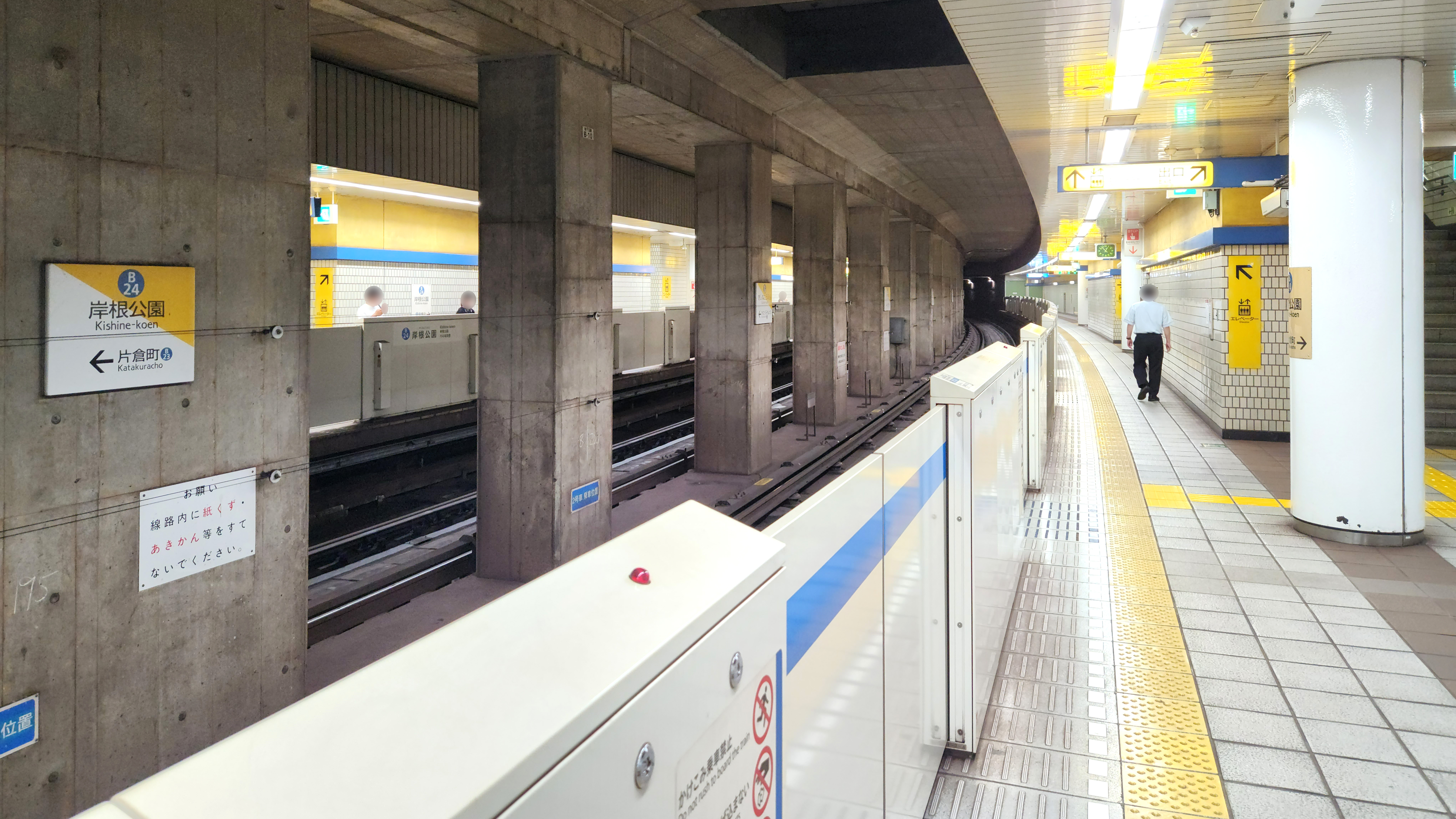
Platform in July 2023

== History ==
Kishine-kōen Station was opened on 14 March 1985. Platform screen doors were installed in April 2007.

== Surrounding area ==
- Kishine Park, namesake of the station
