= Bandōbashi Station =

Metro station in Yokohama, Japan

Coordinates: 35°26′14.5″N 139°37′30″E

B15 Bandōbashi Station 阪東橋駅
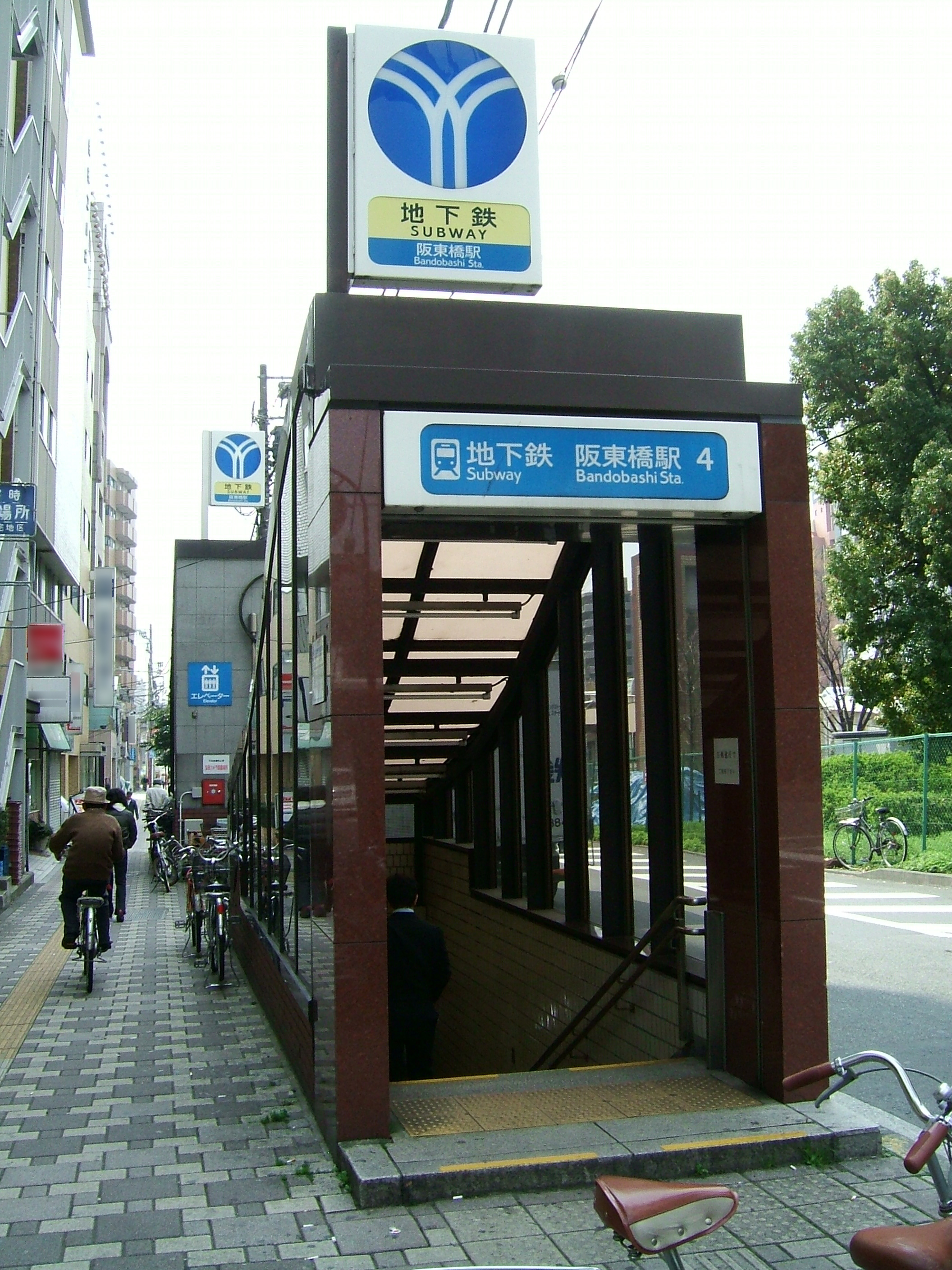
- Entrance No.4

General information
- Location: Yayoi-chō 5-48, Naka, Yokohama, Kanagawa （横浜市中区弥生町五丁目48） Japan
- System: Yokohama Municipal Subway station
- Operator: Yokohama City Transportation Bureau
- Line: Blue Line
- Platforms: 1 island platform
- Tracks: 2

Other information
- Station code: B15

History
- Opened: 16 December 1972; 53 years ago

Passengers
- 2008: 8,150 daily

Services
Preceding station	Yokohama Municipal Subway	Following station
Yoshinochō B14 towards Shonandai	Blue Line Local	Isezaki-chōjamachi B16 towards Azamino
Location
- Location within Yokohama Location within Kanagawa Prefecture Location within Japan

Bandōbashi Station (阪東橋駅, Bandōbashi-eki) is an underground metro station located in Naka-ku, Yokohama, Kanagawa, Japan operated by the Yokohama Municipal Subway’s Blue Line (Line 1). It is 18.1 kilometers from the terminus of the Blue Line at Shōnandai Station.

== Lines ==
- Yokohama Municipal Subway
  - Blue Line

== Station layout ==
Bandōbashi Station is an underground station with a single island platform serving two tracks.

=== Platforms ===
1	■ Blue Line (Yokohama)	Kamiōoka, Totsuka, Shōnandai
2	■ Blue Line (Yokohama)	Kannai, Yokohama, Shin-Yokohama, Azamino

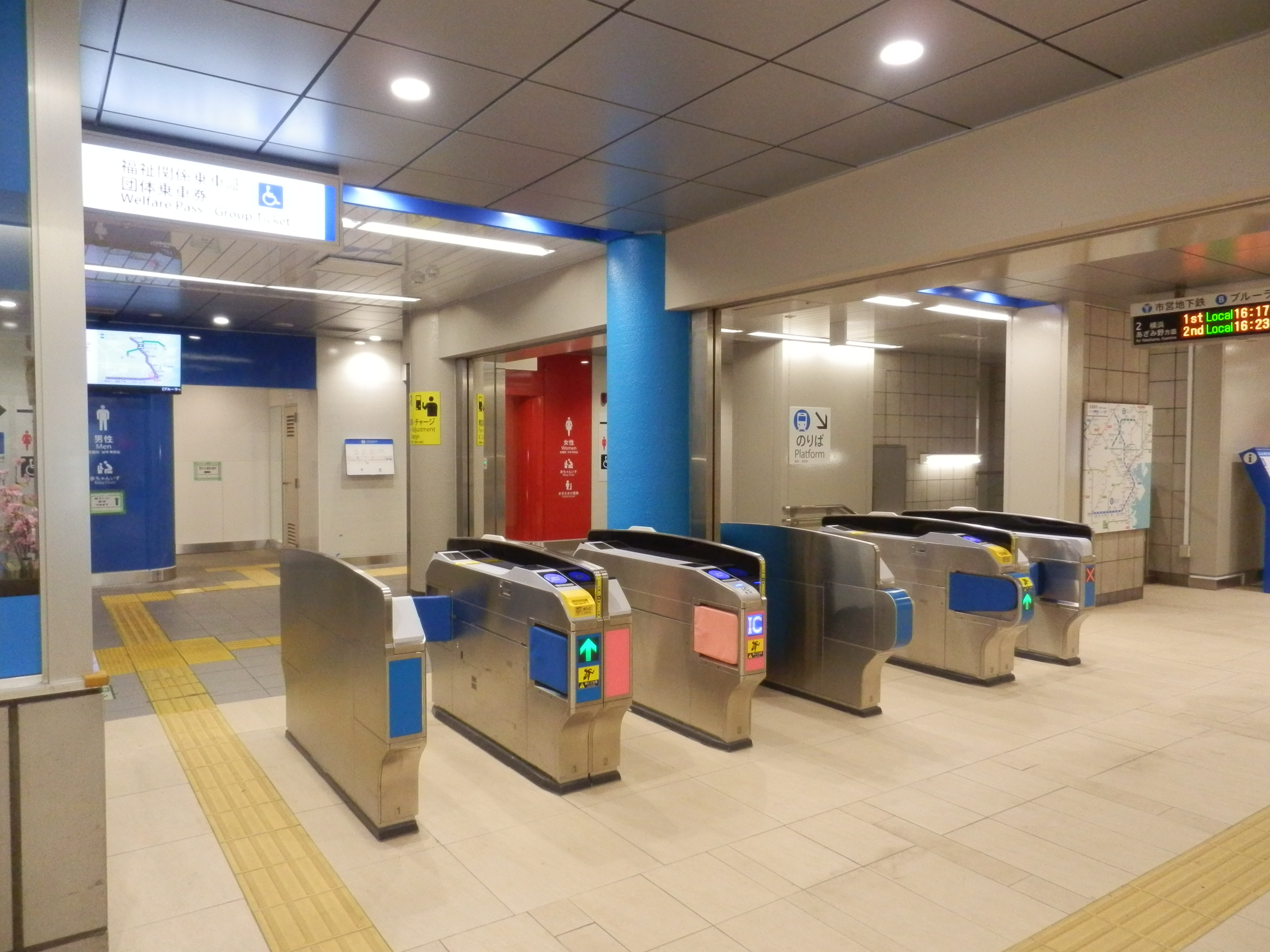
Ticket gates

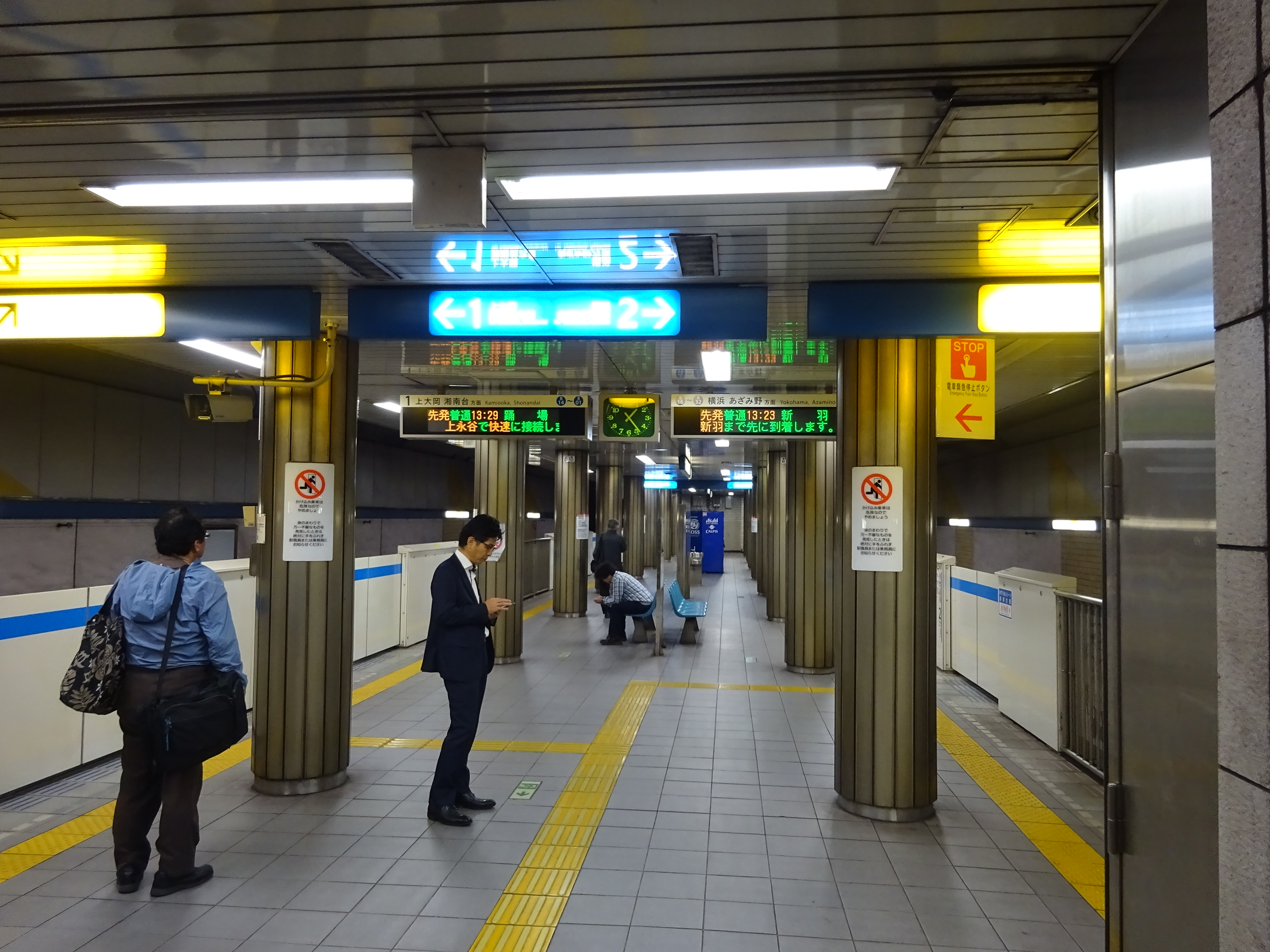
Platform

== History ==
Bandōbashi Station was opened on 16 December 1972. Platform screen doors were installed in September 2007.
