= Nōkendai Station =

Railway station in Yokohama, Japan

KK48 Nōkendai Station 能見台駅
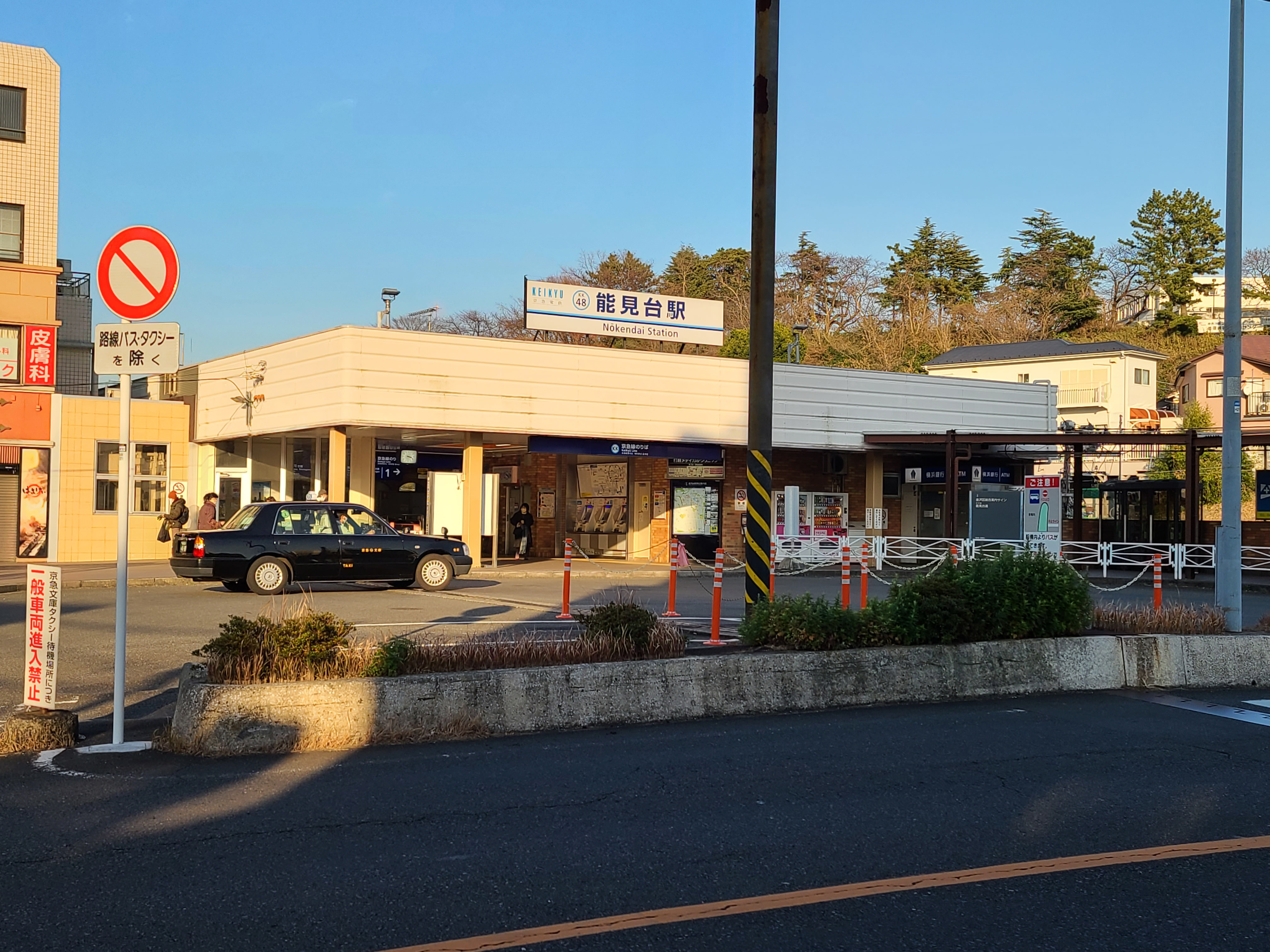
- Nōkendai Station, January 2021

General information
- Location: Nōkendai-dori 2-1, Kanazawa-ku, Yokohama-shi, Kanagawa-ken 236-0053; Japan
- Coordinates: 35.3607°N 139.6292°E
- Operator: Keikyū
- Line: Keikyū Main Line
- Distance: 37.4 km from Shinagawa
- Platforms: 2 side platforms
- Connections: Bus stop

Other information
- Station code: KK48
- Website: Official website

History
- Opened: May 10, 1944
- Former names: Yatsuzaka (until 1982)

Passengers
- 2019: 30,365 daily

Services
Preceding station	Keikyu	Following station
Kanazawa-Bunko KK49 towards Kanazawa-hakkei	Main Line Express	Sugita KK46 towards Keikyū Kamata
Kanazawa-Bunko KK49 towards Uraga	Main Line Local	Keikyū Tomioka KK47 towards Shinagawa
Location
- Location within Kanagawa Prefecture Location within Japan

Nōkendai Station (能見台駅, Nōkendai-eki) is a passenger railway station located in Kanazawa-ku, Yokohama, Kanagawa Prefecture, Japan, operated by the private railway company Keikyū.

== Lines ==
Nōkendai Station is served by the Keikyū Main Line and is located 37.4 kilometers from the terminus of the line at Shinagawa Station in Tokyo.

== Station layout ==
The station consists of two elevated opposed side platforms with the station building located underneath.

=== Platforms ===
1	■ Keikyū Main Line	for Kanazawa Bunko, Misakiguchi, Uraga
2	■ Keikyū Main Line	for Yokohama, Haneda Airport, Shinagawa, Sengakuji, Oshiage

== History ==
Nōkendai Station was opened on May 10, 1944, as Yatsuzaka Station (谷津坂駅, Yatsuzaka-eki). It was relocated to its present address and rebuilt as an elevated station in 1969. A new station building and bus terminal were completed on December 1, 1982, and the station renamed to its present name at that time.

Keikyū introduced station numbering to its stations on 21 October 2010; Nōkendai Station was assigned station number KK48.

== Passenger statistics ==
In fiscal 2019, the station was used by an average of 30,365 passengers daily.

The passenger figures for previous years are as shown below.

Fiscal year	daily average
2005	29,480
2010	31,041
2015	31,598

== Surrounding area ==
- Kanagawa Cardiovascular and Respiratory Disease Center
- Yokohama Quarantine Station Nagahama Measures Station
- Tomioka Junior High School, Nokendai Elementary School,

== See also ==
- List of railway stations in Japan
