= Maita Station (Kanagawa) =

Metro station in Yokohama, Japan

Coordinates: 35°25′48″N 139°36′36″E

B13 Maita Station 蒔田駅
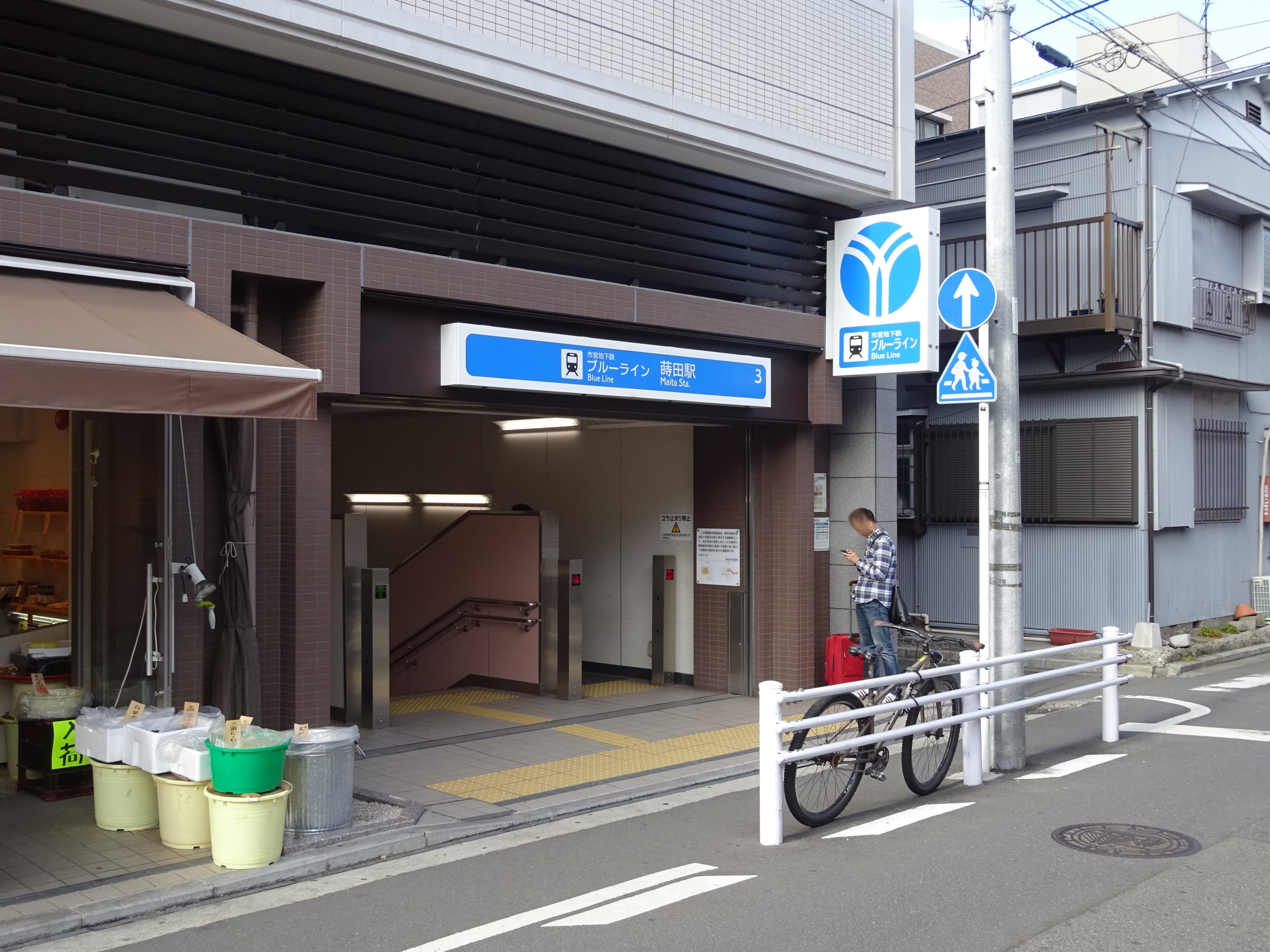
- Entrance No.3

General information
- Location: Miyamoto-chō 3-46, Minami, Yokohama, Kanagawa （横浜市南区宮元町三丁目46） Japan
- System: Yokohama Municipal Subway station
- Operator: Yokohama City Transportation Bureau
- Line: Blue Line
- Platforms: 2 side platforms
- Tracks: 2

Other information
- Station code: B13

History
- Opened: 16 December 1972; 53 years ago

Passengers
- 2008: 11,315 daily

Services
Preceding station	Yokohama Municipal Subway	Following station
Gumyōji B12 towards Shonandai	Blue Line Local	Yoshinochō B14 towards Azamino
Location
- Location within Yokohama Location within Kanagawa Prefecture Location within Japan

Maita Station (蒔田駅, Maita-eki) is an underground metro station located in Minami-ku, Yokohama, Kanagawa, Japan operated by the Yokohama Municipal Subway’s Blue Line (Line 1). It is 16.5 kilometers from the terminus of the Blue Line at Shōnandai Station.

== Lines ==
- Yokohama Municipal Subway
  - Blue Line

== Station layout ==
Maita Station is an underground station with two opposed side platforms serving two tracks.

=== Platforms ===
1	■ Blue Line (Yokohama)	Kamiōoka, Totsuka, Shōnandai
2	■ Blue Line (Yokohama)	Kannai, Yokohama, Shin-Yokohama, Azamino

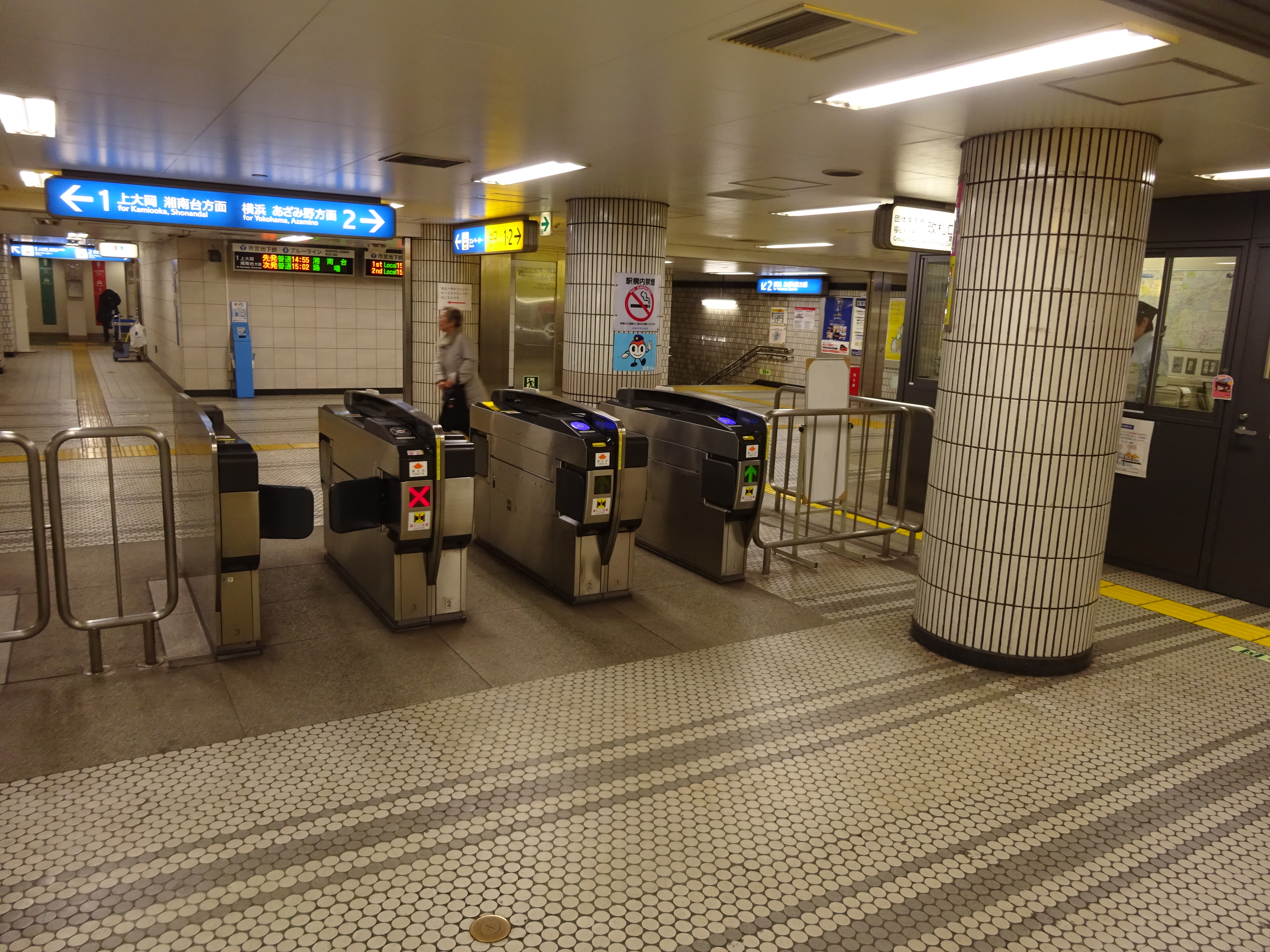
Ticket gates

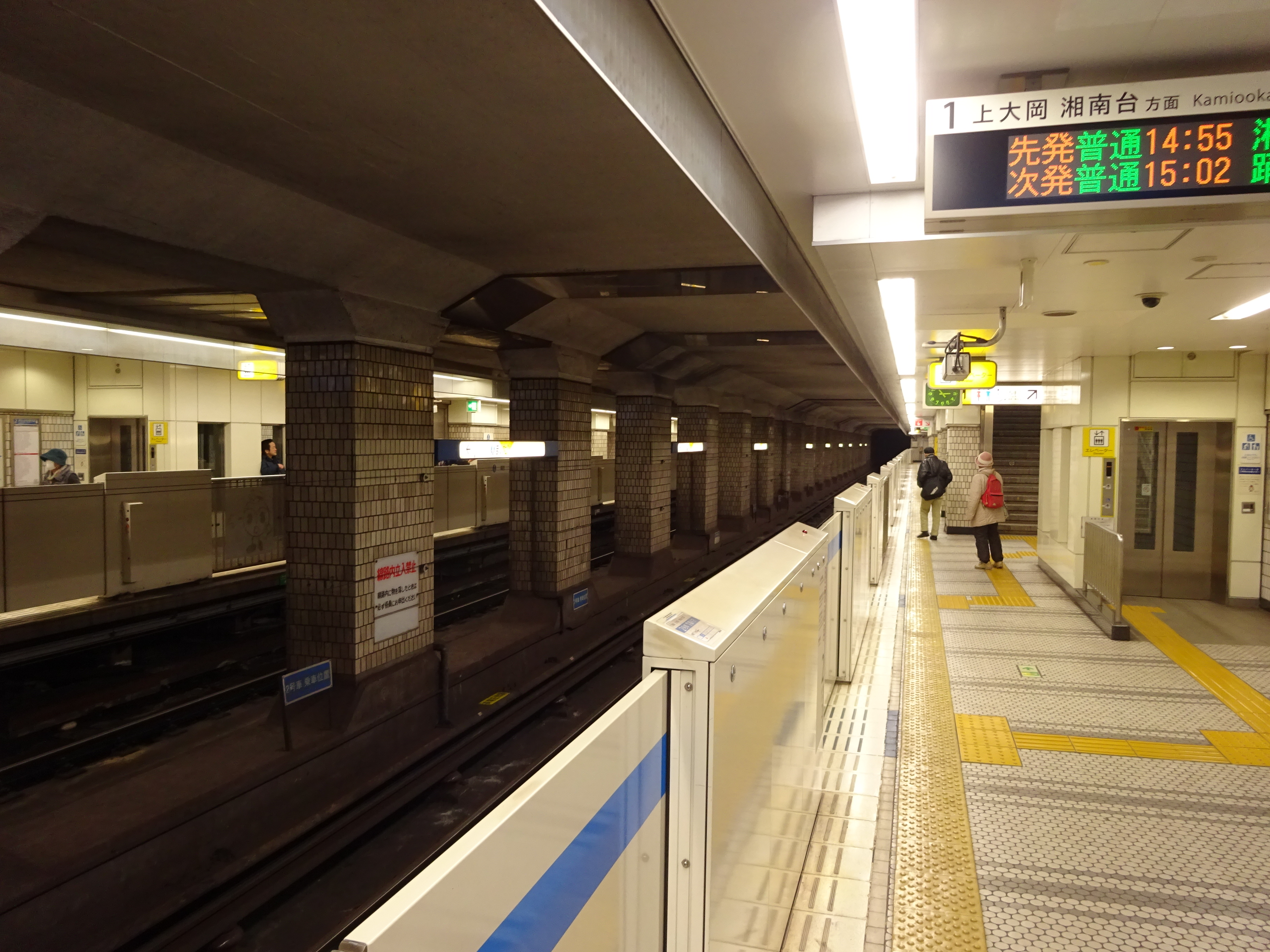
Platform

== History ==
Maita Station was opened on 16 December 1972. Platform screen doors were installed in September 2007.

== Attractions ==
- Ōyamanezunomikoto Shinji Kyōkai headquarters
