= Keikyū Tomioka Station =

Railway station in Yokohama, Japan

KK47 Keikyū Tomioka Station 京急富岡駅
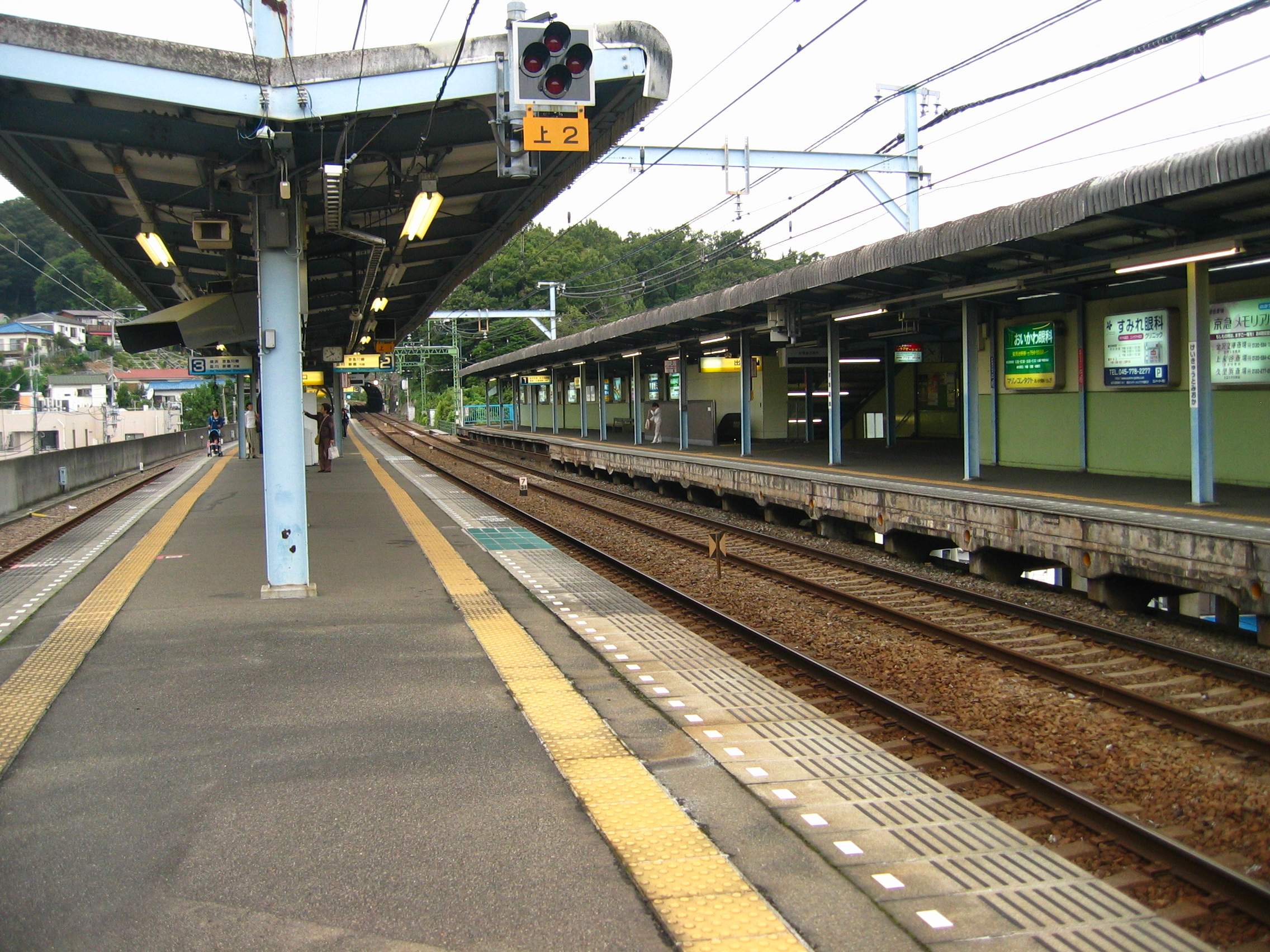
- Keikyū Tomioka Station

General information
- Location: Tomiokanishi 7-1-1, Kanazawa-ku, Yokohama-shi, Kanagawa-ken 236-0052; Japan
- Coordinates: 35.3666°N 139.6297°E
- Operator: Keikyū
- Line: Keikyū Main Line
- Distance: 36.7 km from Shinagawa
- Platforms: 1 side + 1 island platform
- Connections: Bus stop

Other information
- Station code: KK47
- Website: Official website

History
- Opened: July 10, 1930
- Former names: Shōnan Tomioka; Keihin Tomioka (until 1963)

Passengers
- 2019: 21,764 daily

Services
Preceding station	Keikyu	Following station
Nōkendai KK48 towards Uraga	Main Line Local	Sugita KK46 towards Shinagawa
Location
- Location within Kanagawa Prefecture Location within Japan

Keikyū Tomioka Station (京急富岡駅, Keikyū Tomioka-eki) is a passenger railway station located in Kanazawa-ku, Yokohama, Kanagawa Prefecture, Japan, operated by the private railway company Keikyū.

== Lines ==
Keikyū Tomioka Station is served by the Keikyū Main Line and is located 36.7 kilometers from the terminus of the line at Shinagawa Station in Tokyo.

== Station layout ==
The station consists of a single elevated island platform and single side platform serving three tracks, with the station building located underneath.

=== Platforms ===
1	■ Keikyū Main Line	for Kanazawa Bunko, Misakiguchi, Uraga
2,3	■ Keikyū Main Line	for Yokohama, Haneda Airport Terminal 1·2, Shinagawa, Sengakuji, Oshiage

== History ==
Keikyū Tomioka Station was opened on July 10, 1930 as Shōnan Tomioka Station (湘南富岡駅, Shōnan Tomioka-eki) on the Shōnan Electric Railway, which merged with the Keihin Electric Railway on November 1, 1941. The station closed on January 10, 1947, and reopened on March 1, 1947 exclusively for the use by American occupation forces in Japan. Ordinary Japanese citizens were permitted to use the station again in late 1948. The station was relocated to its present address on December 1, 1955 and renamed Keihin Tomioka Station (京浜富岡駅, Keihin Tomioka-eki) on November 1, 1963. It assumed its present name on June 1, 1987.

Keikyū introduced station numbering to its stations on 21 October 2010; Keikyū Tomioka Station was assigned station number KK47.

== Passenger statistics ==
In fiscal 2019, the station was used by an average of 21,764 passengers daily.

The passenger figures for previous years are as shown below.

Fiscal year	daily average
2005	27,024
2010	25,181
2015	23,432

== Surrounding area ==
- Kanagawa Prefectural Kanazawa Comprehensive High School
- Yokohama City Tomioka Elementary School
- Yokohama Tomioka Post Office
- Tomioka Hachiman-gu

== See also ==
- List of railway stations in Japan
