= Yoshinochō Station =

Metro station in Yokohama, Japan

Coordinates: 35°26′07.76″N 139°37′06.44″E

B14 Yoshinochō Station 吉野町駅
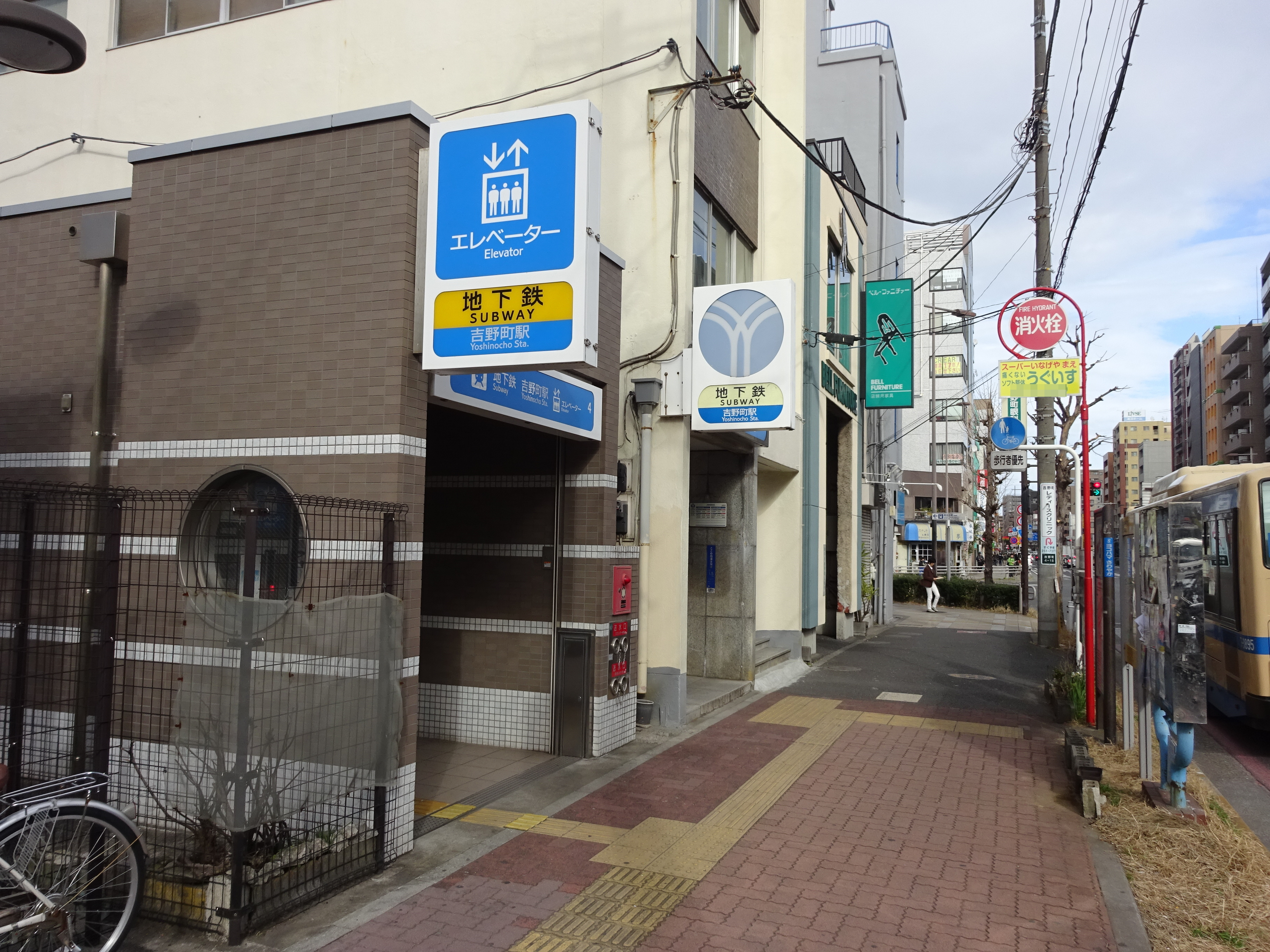
- Entrance No.4

General information
- Location: Yoshinochō 3-7, Minami, Yokohama, Kanagawa （横浜市南区吉野町三丁目7） Japan
- System: Yokohama Municipal Subway station
- Operator: Yokohama City Transportation Bureau
- Line: Blue Line
- Platforms: 1 island platform
- Tracks: 2

Other information
- Station code: B14

History
- Opened: 16 December 1972; 53 years ago

Passengers
- 2008: 6,447 daily

Services
Preceding station	Yokohama Municipal Subway	Following station
Maita B13 towards Shonandai	Blue Line Local	Bandōbashi B15 towards Azamino
Location
- Location within Yokohama Location within Kanagawa Prefecture Location within Japan

Yoshinochō Station (吉野町駅, Yoshinochō-eki) is an underground metro station located in Minami-ku, Yokohama, Kanagawa, Japan operated by the Yokohama Municipal Subway’s Blue Line (Line 1). It is 17.6 km (10.9 mi) from the terminus of the Blue Line at Shōnandai Station.

== Lines ==
- Yokohama Municipal Subway
  - Blue Line

== Station layout ==
Yoshinochō Station is an underground station with a single island platform serving two tracks.

=== Platforms ===
1	■ Blue Line (Yokohama)	Kamiōoka, Totsuka, Shōnandai
2	■ Blue Line (Yokohama)	Kannai, Yokohama, Shin-Yokohama, Azamino

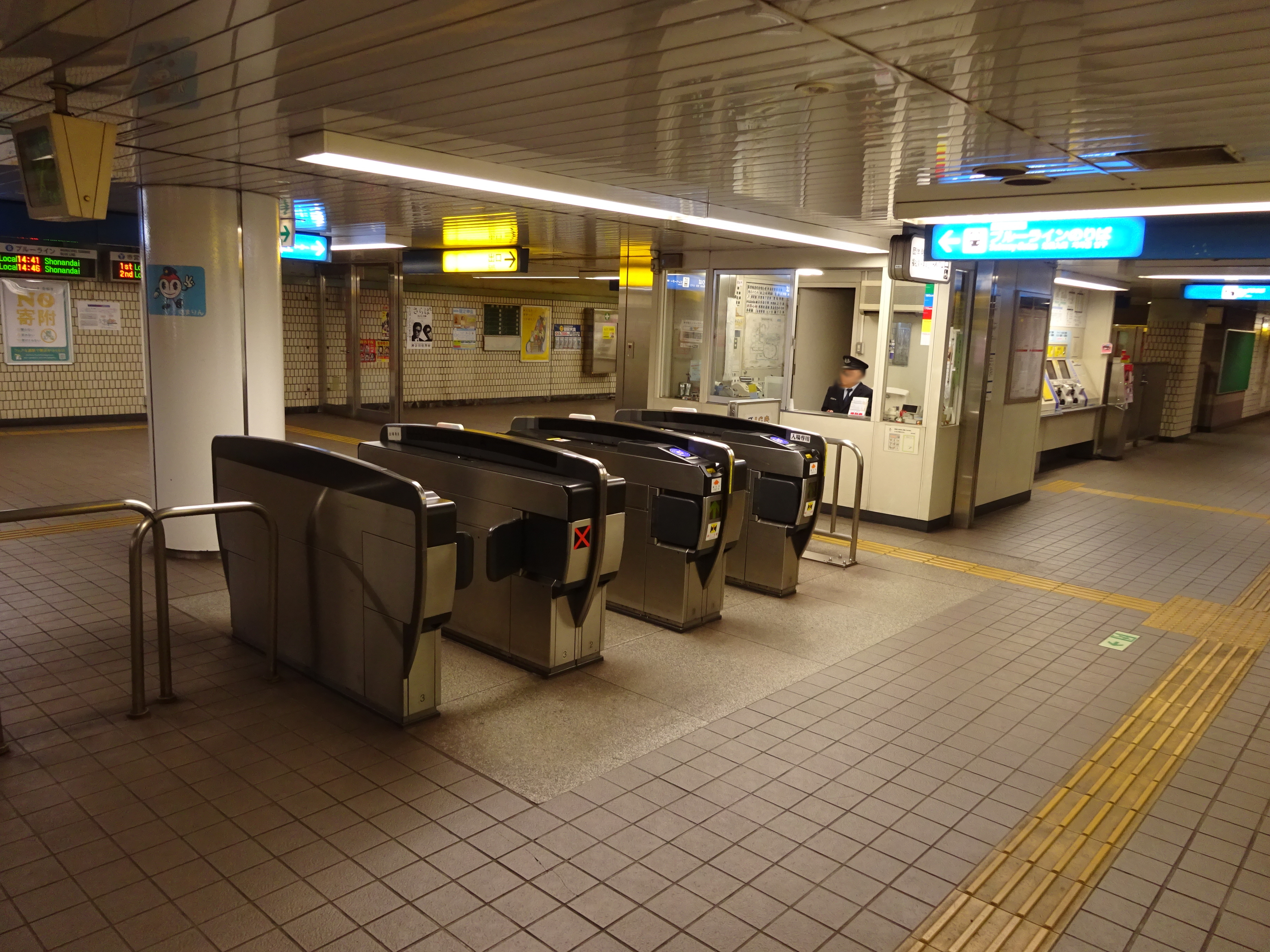
Ticket gates

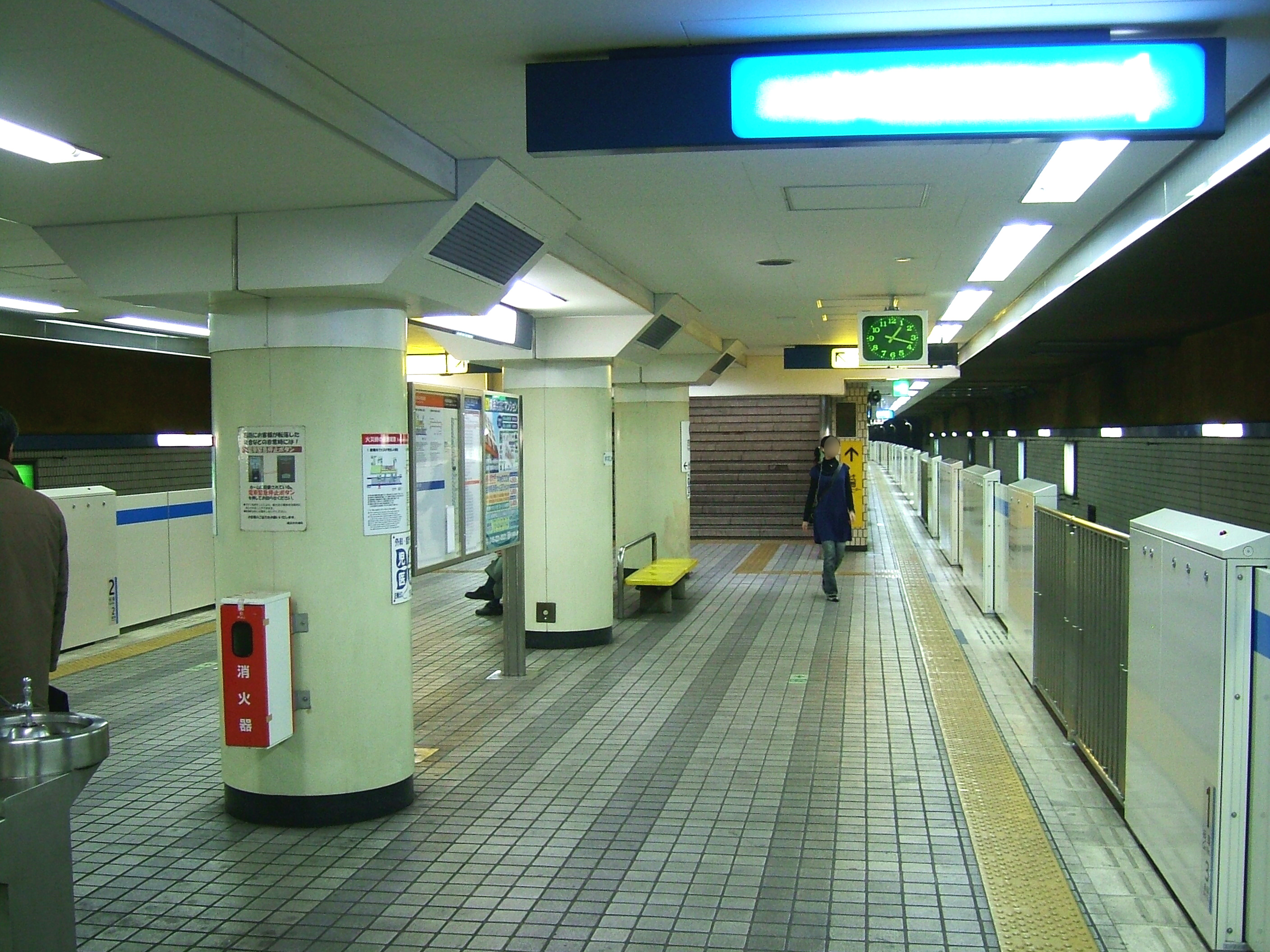
Platform

== History ==
Yoshinochō Station was opened on 16 December 1972. Platform screen doors were installed in September 2007.
