= Katakurachō Station =

Metro station in Yokohama, Japan

Coordinates: 35°29′24.74″N 139°36′23.44″E

B23 Katakurachō Station 片倉町駅
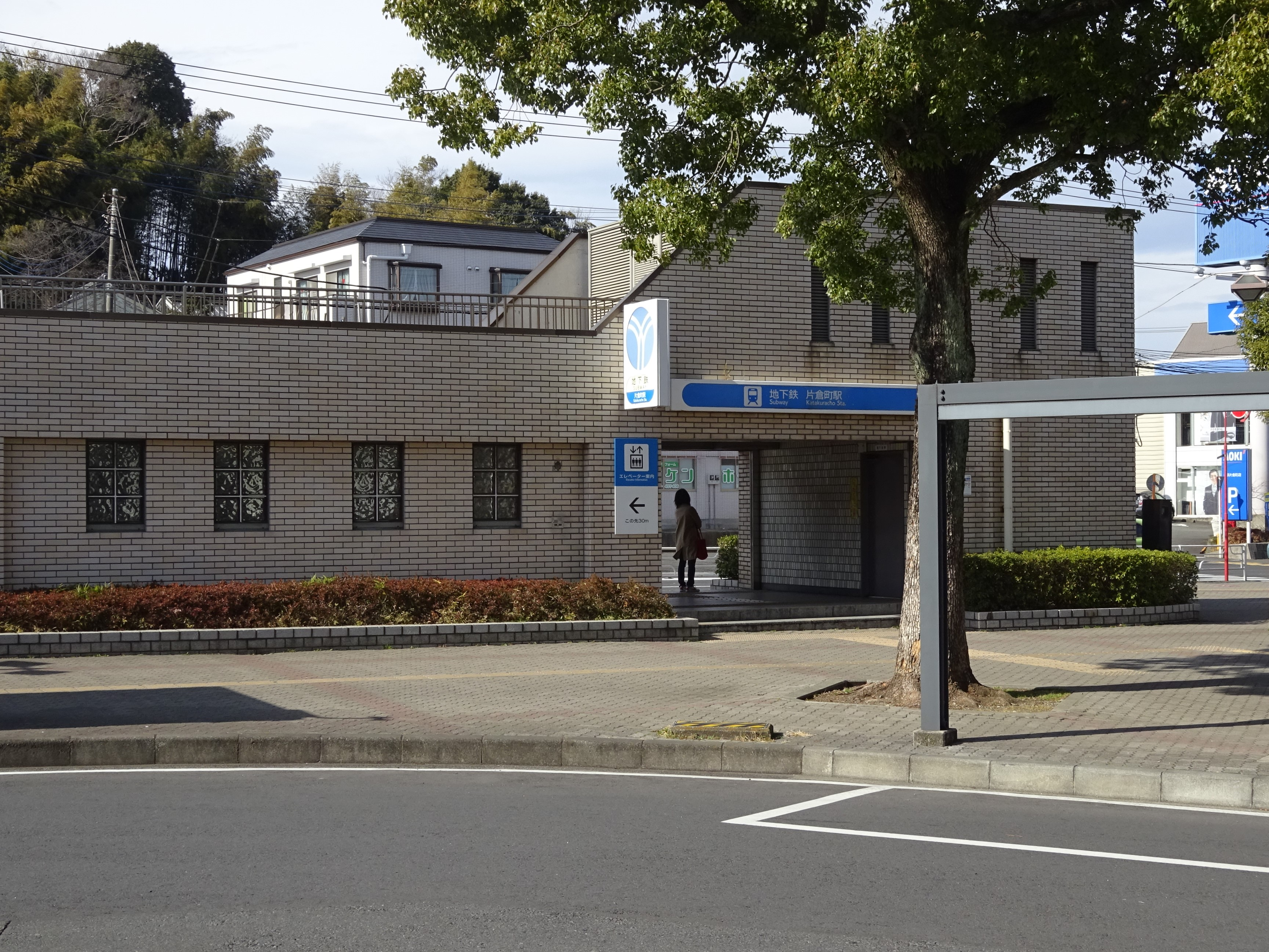

General information
- Location: Katakura 1-chōme 33-7, Kanagawa, Yokohama, Kanagawa （横浜市神奈川区片倉一丁目33-7） Japan
- System: Yokohama Municipal Subway station
- Operator: Yokohama City Transportation Bureau
- Line: Blue Line
- Platforms: 2 side platforms
- Tracks: 2

Other information
- Station code: B23

History
- Opened: 14 March 1985; 41 years ago

Passengers
- 2008: 10,141 daily

Services
Preceding station	Yokohama Municipal Subway	Following station
Mitsuzawa-kamichō B22 towards Shonandai	Blue Line Local	Kishine-kōen B24 towards Azamino
Location
- Location within Yokohama Location within Kanagawa Prefecture Location within Japan

Katakurachō Station (片倉町駅, Katakurachō-eki) is an underground metro station located in Kanagawa-ku, Yokohama, Kanagawa Prefecture, Japan operated by the Yokohama Municipal Subway’s Blue Line (Line 3). It is 26.7 kilometers from the terminus of the Blue Line at Shōnandai Station.

== Lines ==
- Yokohama Municipal Subway
  - Blue Line

== Station layout ==
Katakurachō Station has a dual opposed side platforms serving two tracks, located four stories underground.

=== Platforms ===
1	■ Blue Line (Yokohama)	Yokohama, Kannai, Totsuka, Shōnandai
2	■ Blue Line (Yokohama)	Shin-Yokohama, Azamino

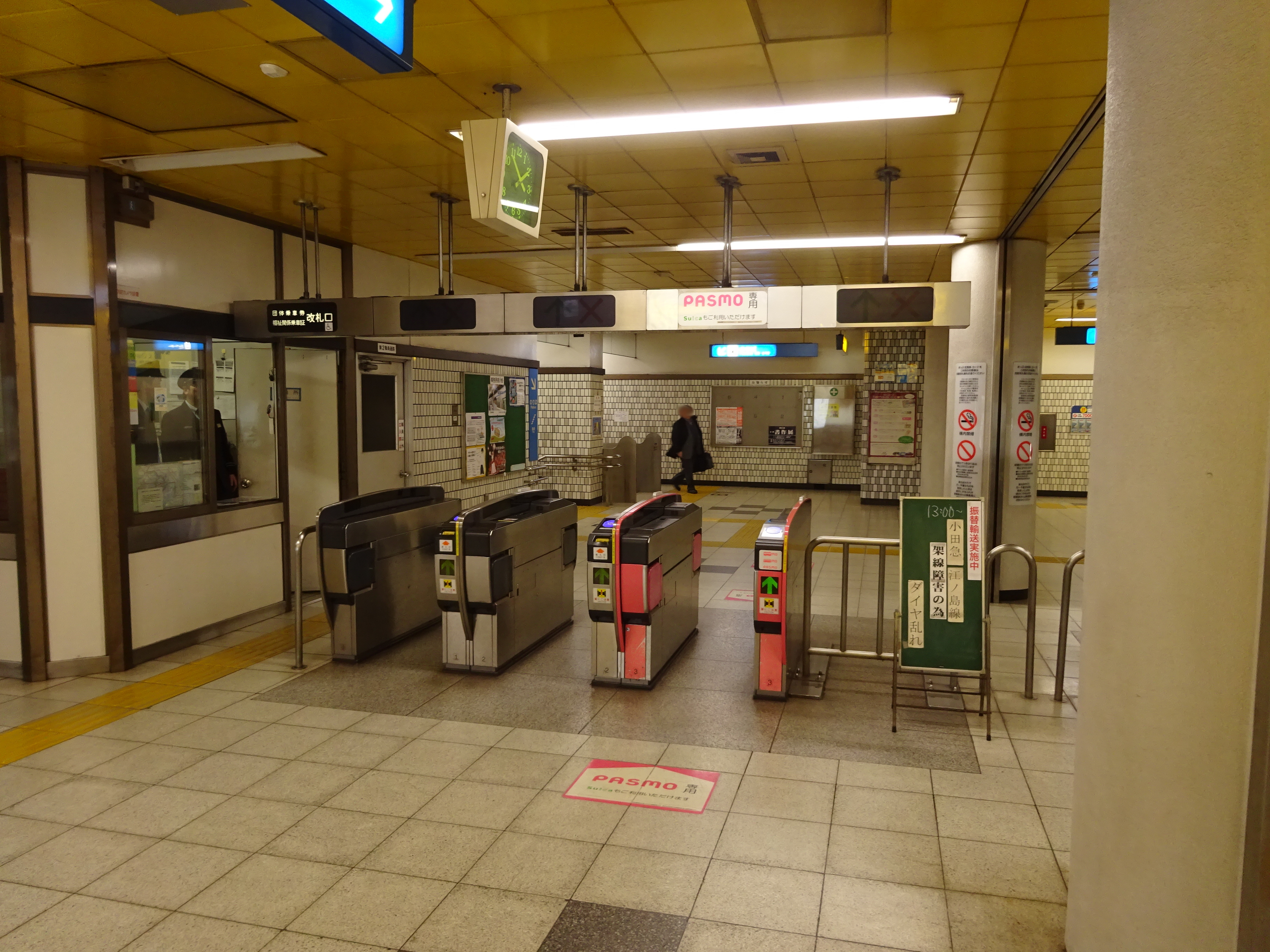
Ticket gates

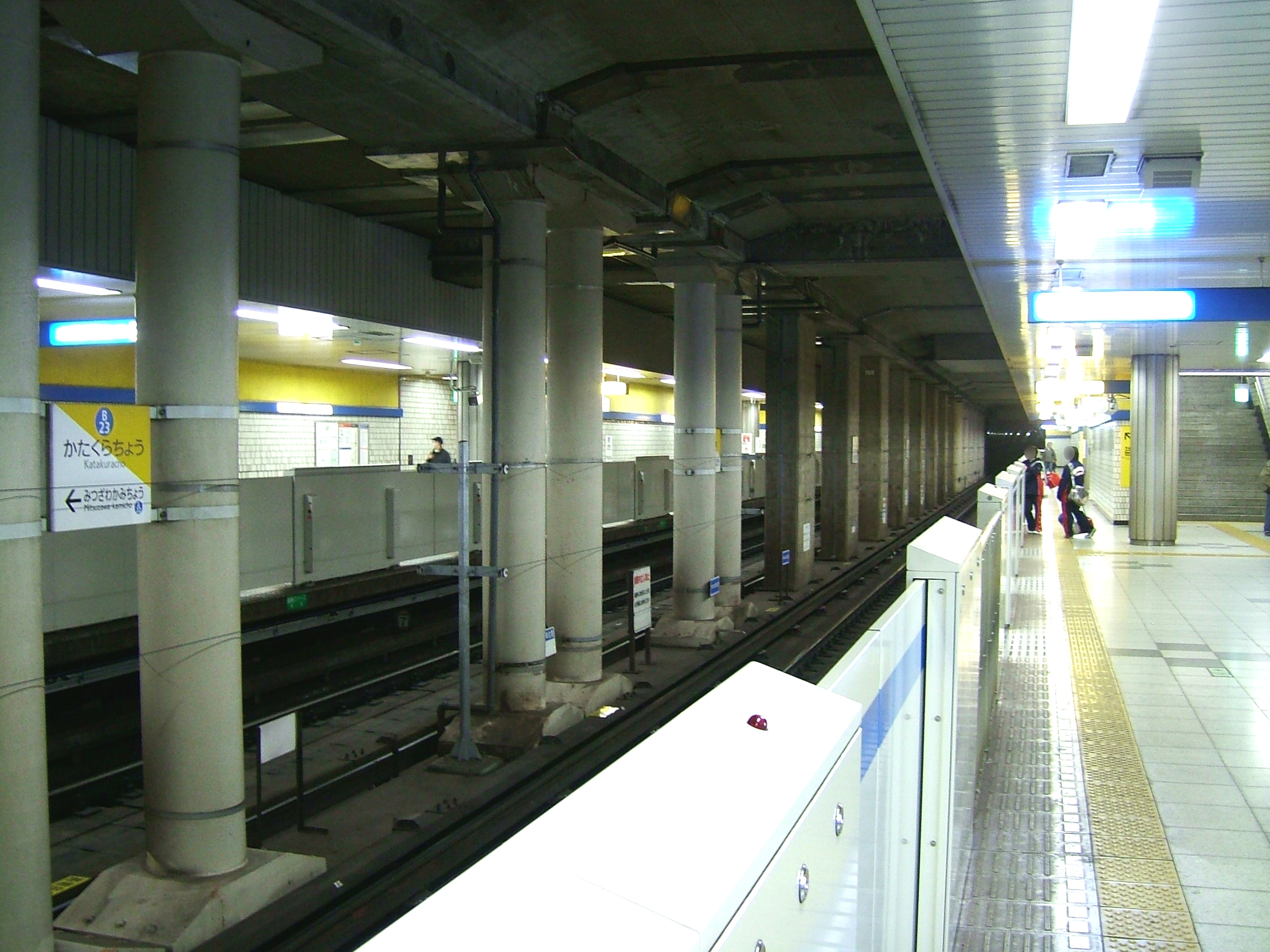
Platform

== History ==
Katakurachō Station was opened on 14 March 1985. Platform screen doors were installed in April 2007.
