= Sugita Station (Kanagawa) =

Railway station in Yokohama, Japan

KK46 Sugita Station 杉田駅
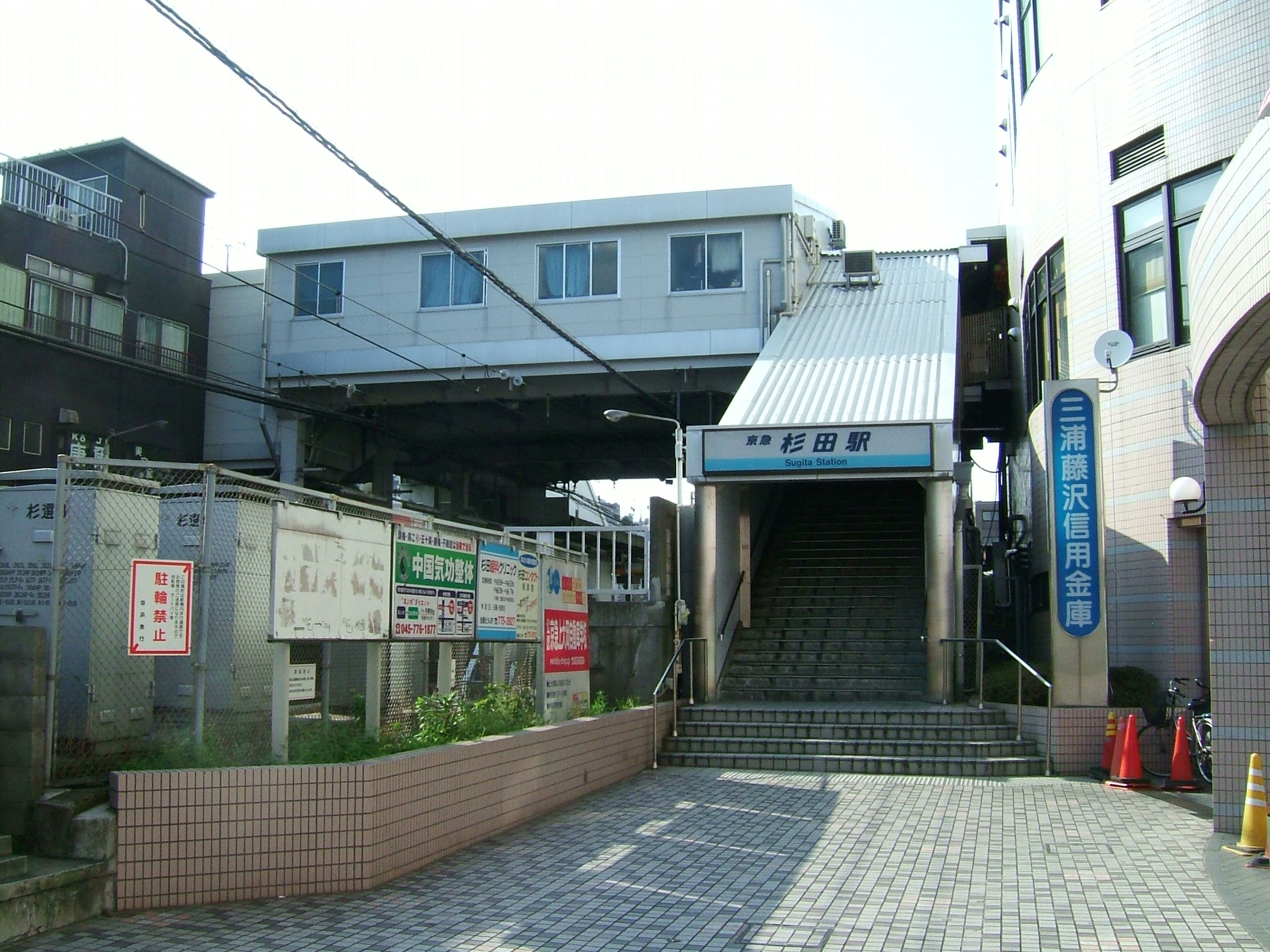
- Sugita Station

General information
- Location: Sugita 2-1-9, Isogo-ku, Yokohama-shi, Kanagawa-ken 235-0033; Japan
- Coordinates: 35°23′0.81″N 139°36′57.13″E
- Operator: Keikyū
- Line: Keikyū Main Line
- Distance: 34.3 km from Shinagawa
- Platforms: 2 side platforms
- Connections: Bus stop

Other information
- Station code: KK46
- Website: Official website

History
- Opened: July 10, 1930

Passengers
- 2019: 33,761 daily

Services
Preceding station	Keikyu	Following station
Nōkendai KK48 towards Kanazawa-hakkei	Main Line Express	Kamiōoka KK44 towards Keikyū Kamata
Keikyu Tomioka KK47 towards Uraga	Main Line Local	Byōbugaura KK45 towards Shinagawa
Location
- Location within Kanagawa Prefecture Location within Japan

Sugita Station (杉田駅, Sugita-eki) is a passenger railway station located in Isogo-ku, Yokohama, Kanagawa Prefecture, Japan, operated by the private railway company Keikyū.

== Lines ==
Sugita Station is served by the Keikyū Main Line and is located 34.3 kilometers from the terminus of the line at Shinagawa Station in Tokyo.

== Station layout ==
The station consists of two elevated opposed side platforms with the station building underneath.

=== Platforms ===
1	■ Keikyū Main Line	for Kanazawa Bunko, Misakiguchi, Uraga
2	■ Keikyū Main Line	for Kamiōoka, Yokohama, Haneda Airport Terminal 1·2, Shinagawa, Sengakuji, Oshiage

Sugita Station is an elevated station with dual opposed side platforms serving two tracks.

== History ==
Sugita Station was opened on July 10, 1930 as a stop on the Shōnan Electric Railway, which merged with the Keihin ELectric Railway on November 1, 1941. It was elevated to a full station on May 1, 1931. A new elevated station building was erected in March 1970, and a completely new station building was completed in April 1993.

Keikyū introduced station numbering to its stations on 21 October 2010; Sugita Station was assigned station number KK46.

== Passenger statistics ==
In fiscal 2019, the station was used by an average of 33,761 passengers daily.

The passenger figures for previous years are as shown below.

Fiscal year	daily average
2005	32,228
2010	33,761
2015	34,648

== Surrounding area ==
- Shin-Sugita Station
- Tōzen-ji

== See also ==
- List of railway stations in Japan
