= Yokohama Municipal Subway 4000 series =

Japanese train type

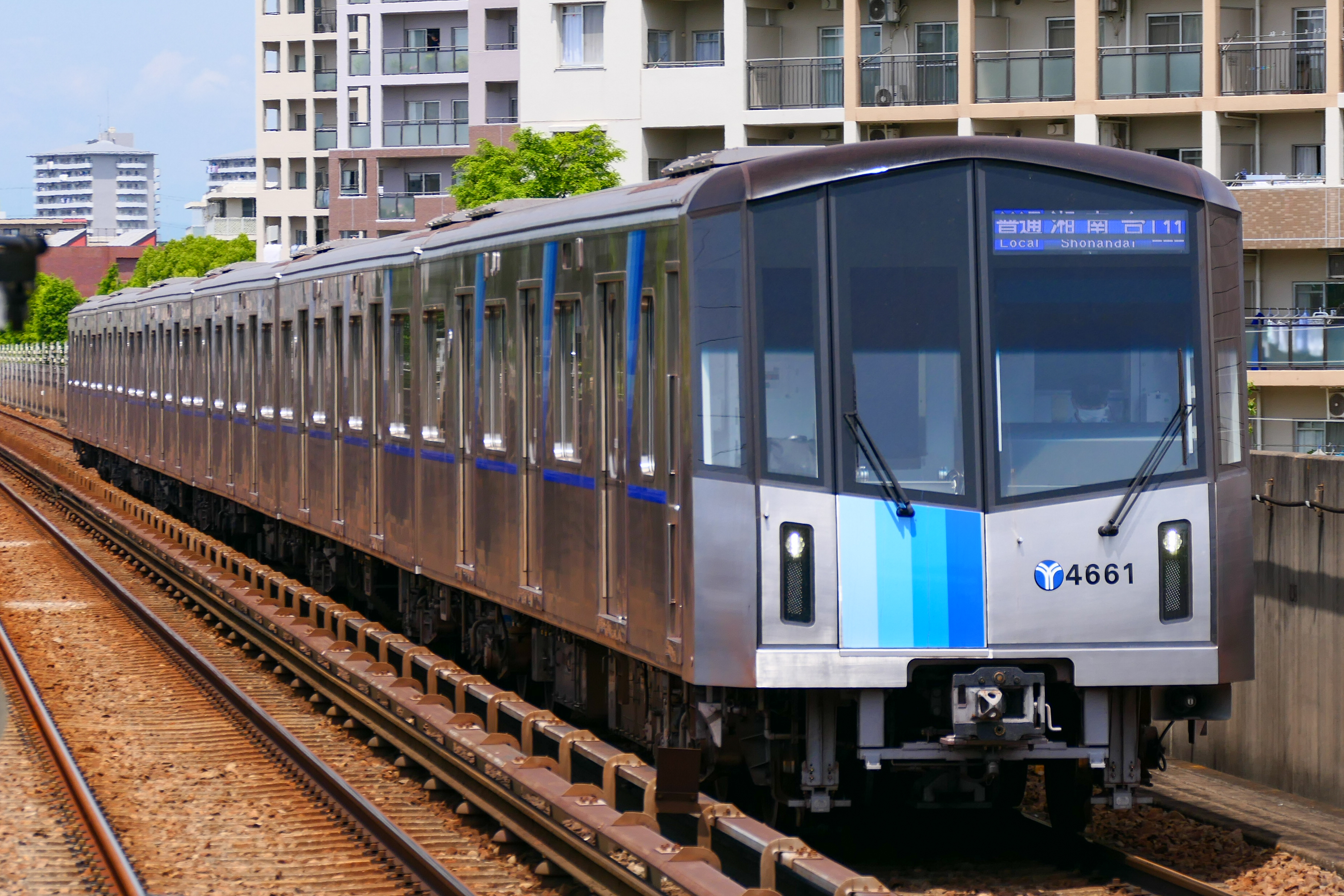
- A 4000 series train at Nakamachidai Station
- In service: 2022–present
- Manufacturer: Kawasaki Heavy Industries
- Built at: Kōbe, Hyōgo
- Replaced: 3000A series
- Constructed: 2021–
- Entered service: 2 May 2022
- Number under construction: 42 carriages (7 sets)
- Number built: 6 carriages (1 set)
- Number in service: 6 carriages (1 set) (As of May 2022)
- Formation: 6-car sets Tc1–M2–M3–M4–M5–Tc6
- Capacity: 766
- Operator: Yokohama City Transportation Bureau
- Depot: Kaminagaya
- Line served: Yokohama Municipal Subway Blue Line

Specifications
- Car body construction: Stainless steel
- Train length: 109.08 m (357 ft 10 in)
- Car length: 18.54 m (60 ft 10 in) (Tc); 18 m (59 ft 1 in) (M)
- Width: 2.76 m (9 ft 1 in)
- Height: 3,575 mm (11 ft 8.7 in)
- Doors: 3 pairs per side
- Wheel diameter: 860 mm (34 in)
- Wheelbase: 2,100 mm (6 ft 11 in)
- Maximum speed: 90 km/h (56 mph) (design); 80 km/h (50 mph) (service)
- Traction system: VVVF
- Traction motors: 16 × 140 kW (188 hp) 3-phase AC induction motor
- Power output: 2.24 MW (3,004 hp)
- Acceleration: 0.89 m/s^{2} (2.0 mph/s)
- Deceleration: 0.97 m/s^{2} (2.2 mph/s) (service); 1.25 m/s^{2} (2.8 mph/s) (emergency)
- Electric systems: 750 V DC third rail
- Current collection: Contact shoe
- UIC classification: 2′2′+Bo′Bo′+Bo′Bo′+Bo′Bo′+Bo′Bo′+2′2′
- Bogies: SS162MB (powered), SS162TB (trailer)
- Safety system: ATC/ATO
- Track gauge: 1,435 mm (4 ft 8 1/2 in) standard gauge

The Yokohama Municipal Subway 4000 series (横浜市交通局4000形) is a metro electric multiple unit (EMU) train type operated by the Yokohama City Transportation Bureau on the Yokohama Municipal Subway Blue Line in Japan since 2022.

== Formation ==
The sets have four powered cars and two leading trailer cars, and are formed as follows.

	← Shōnandai Azamino →					
Designation	Tc1	M2	M3	M4	M5	Tc6
Weight (t)	30.5	34.0	32.5	34.0	33.0	30.0
Capacity (total/seated)	121/39	131/45				121/39

== Interior ==
Longitudinal bucket seating is used throughout.

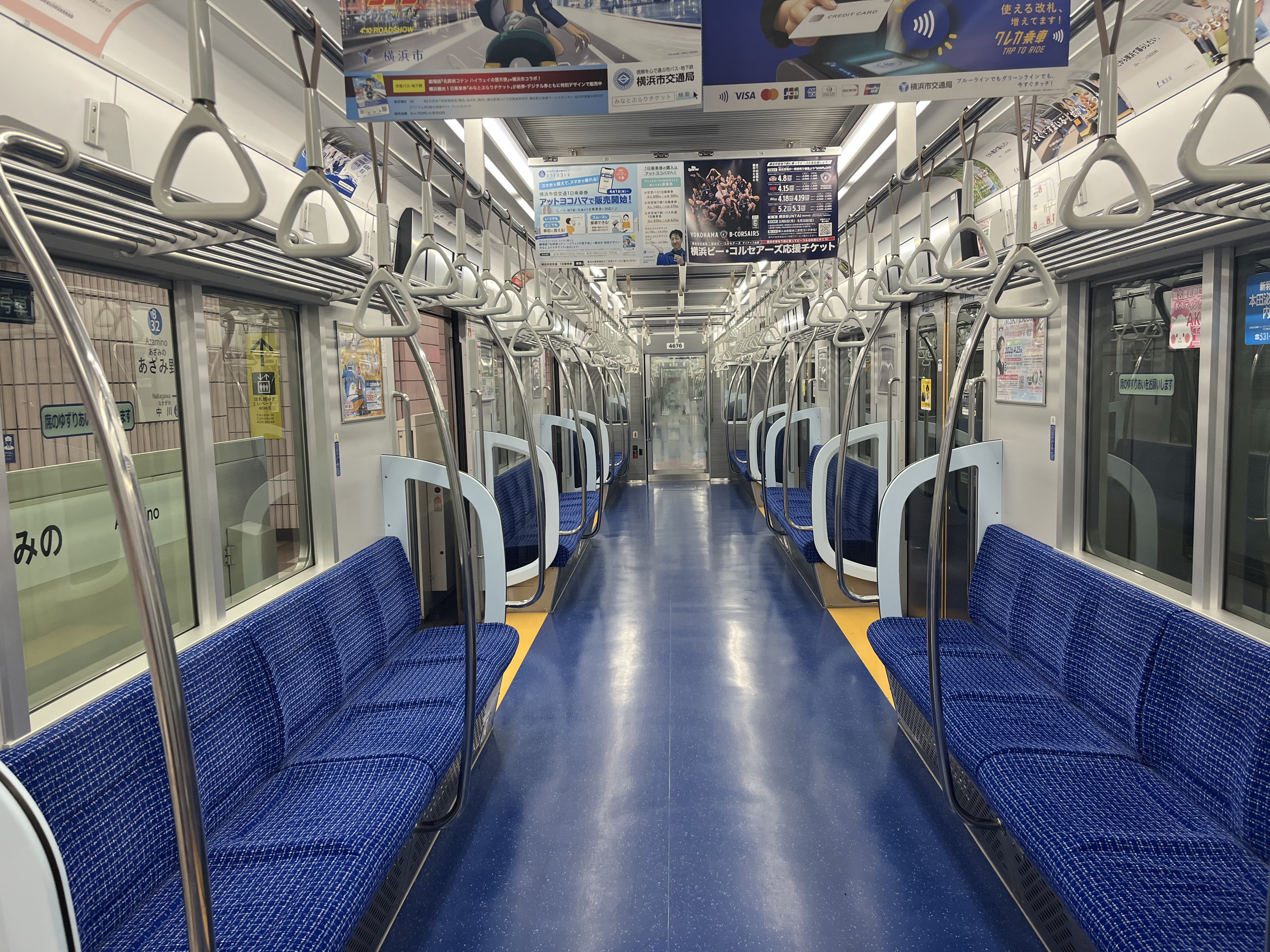
Interior of a 4000 series set

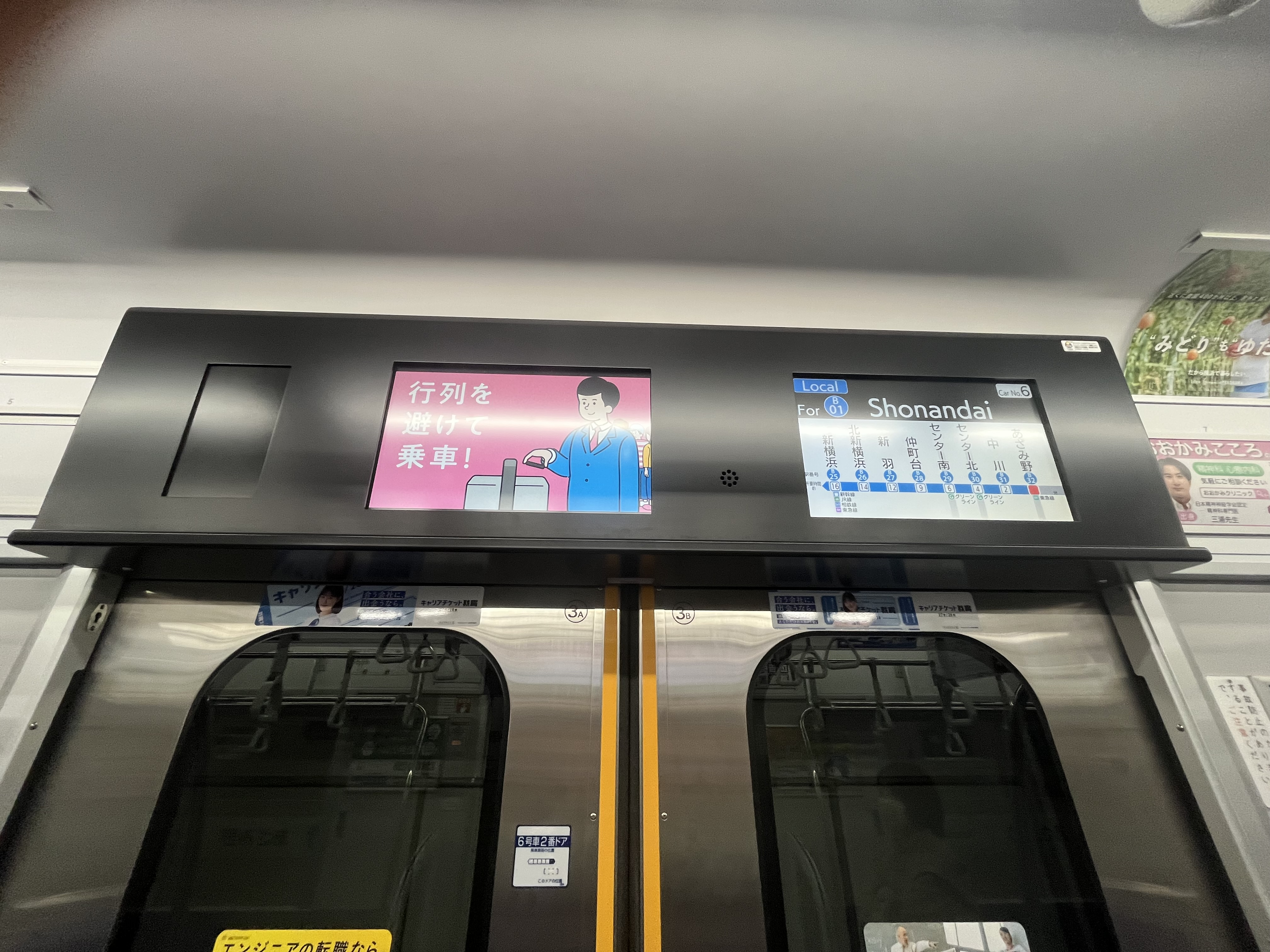
Onboard LCD information screens

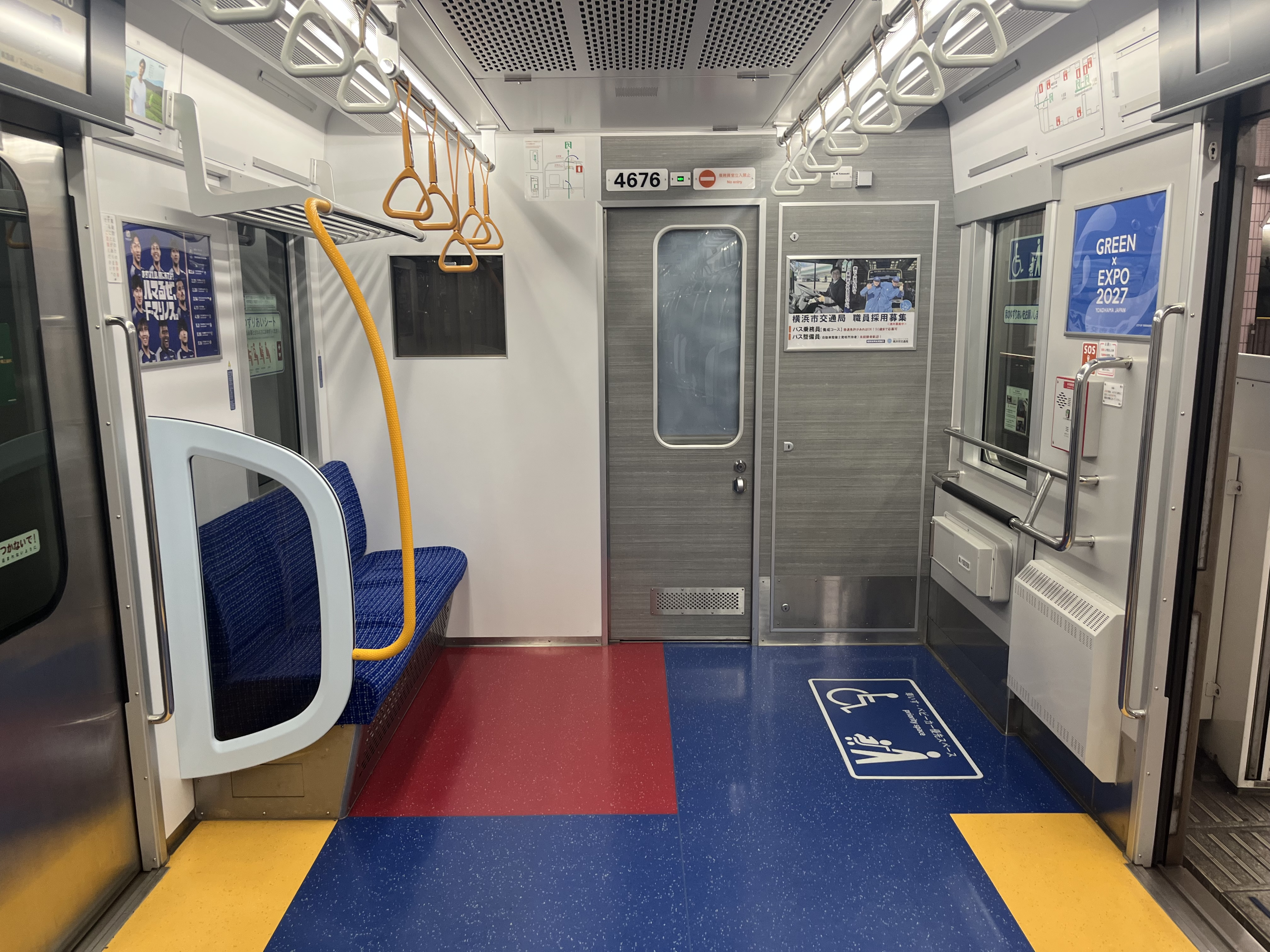
Rear partition wall of the driver's cab

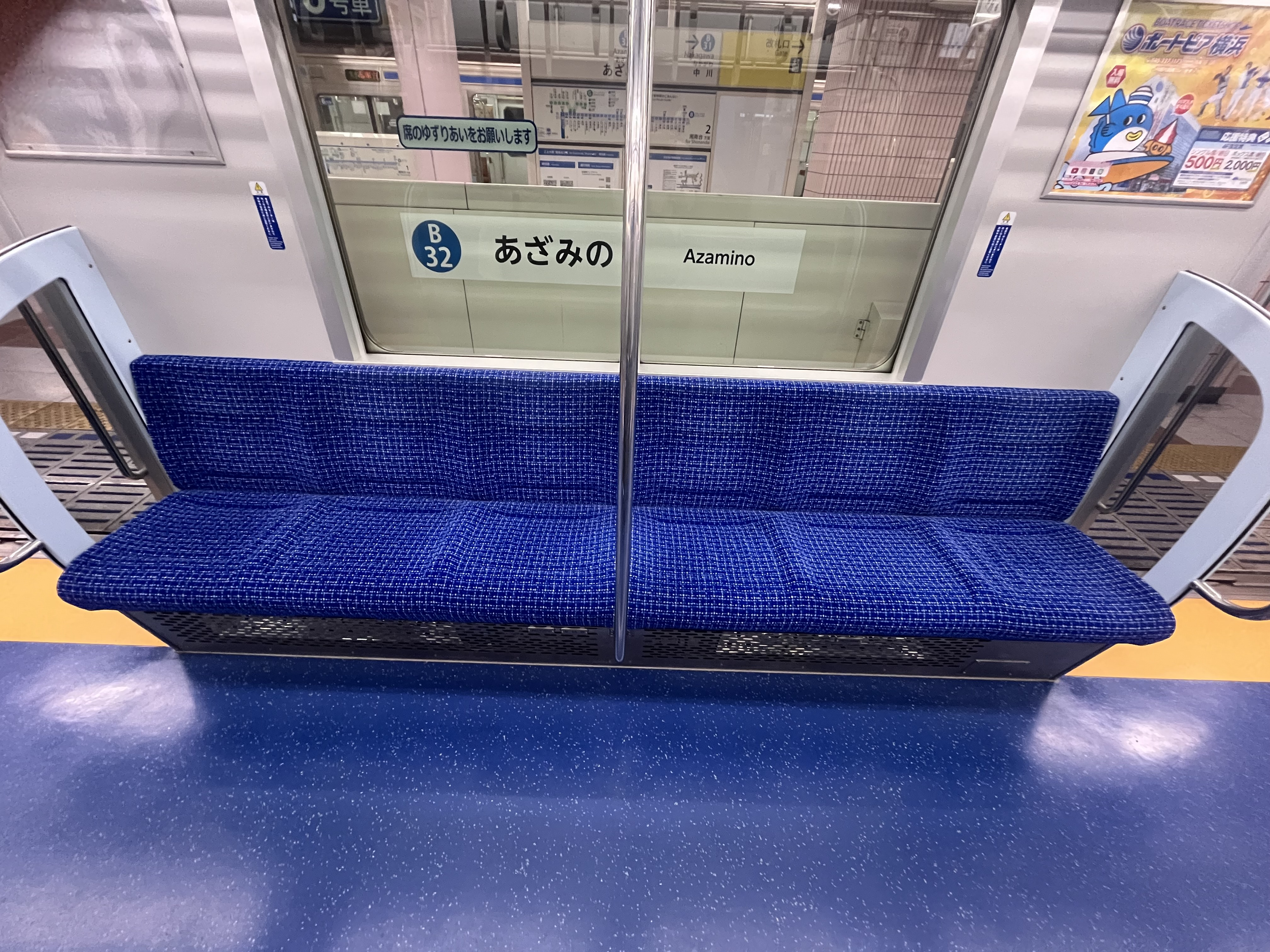
seat

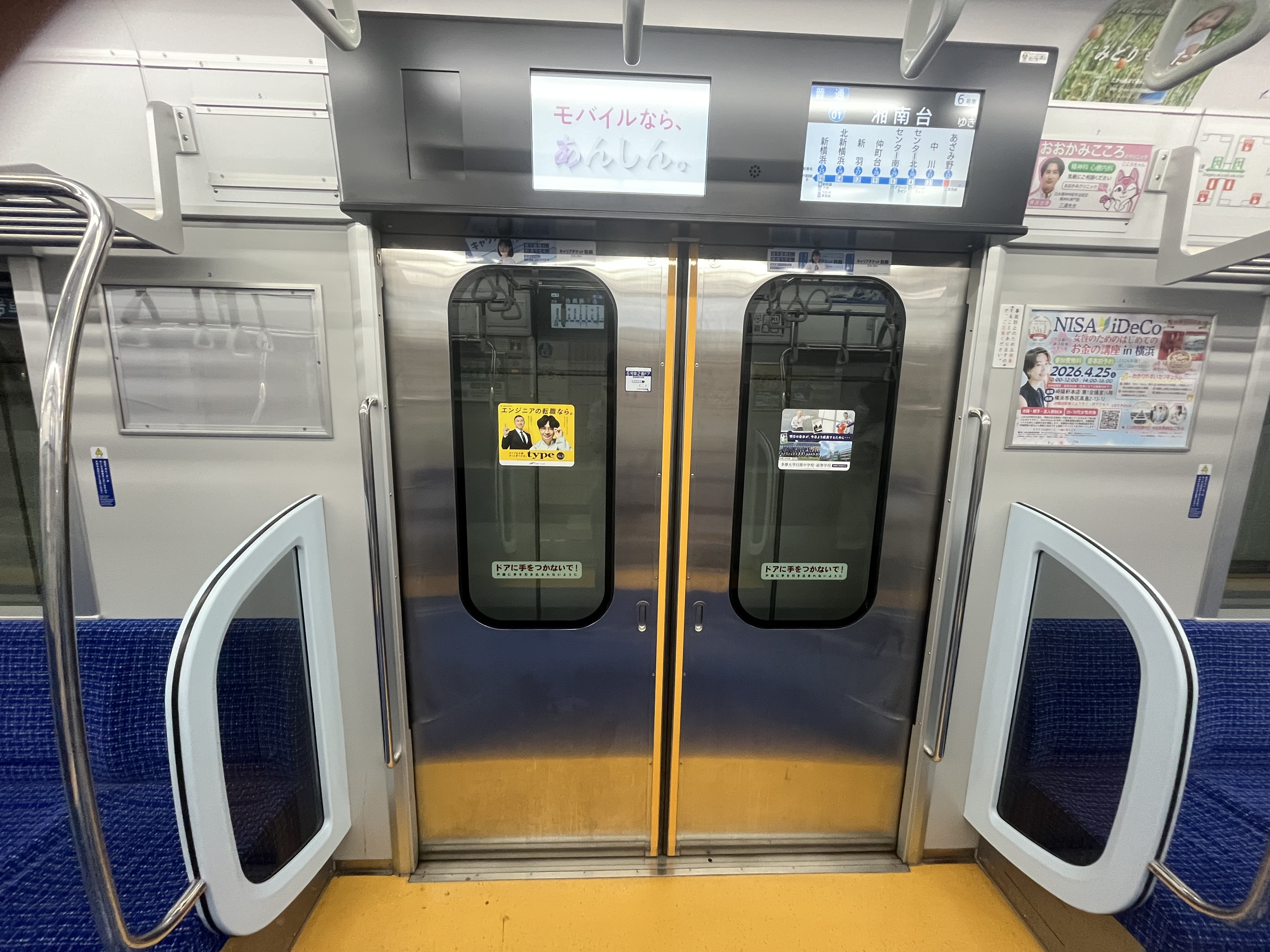
Door

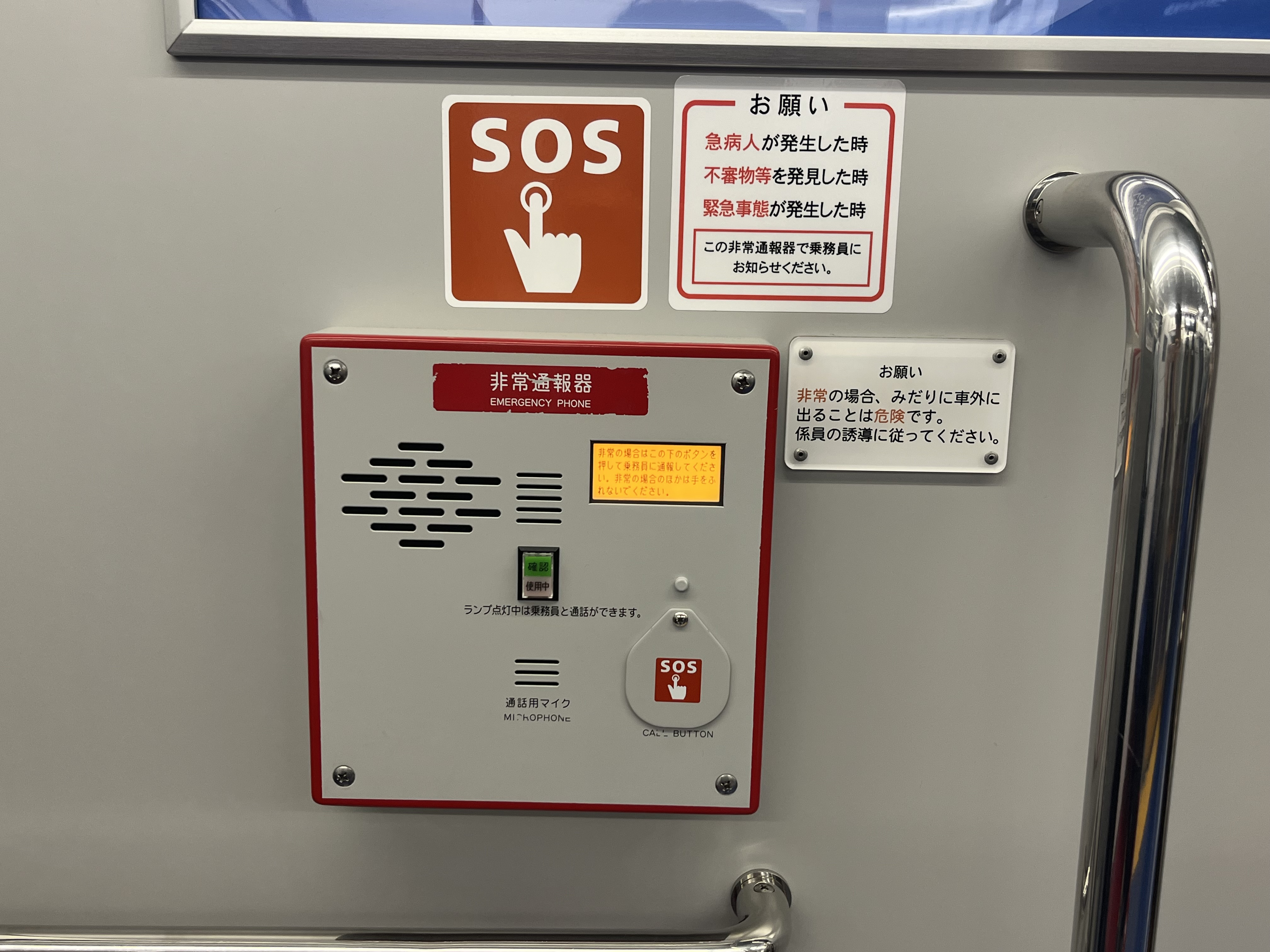
SOS button

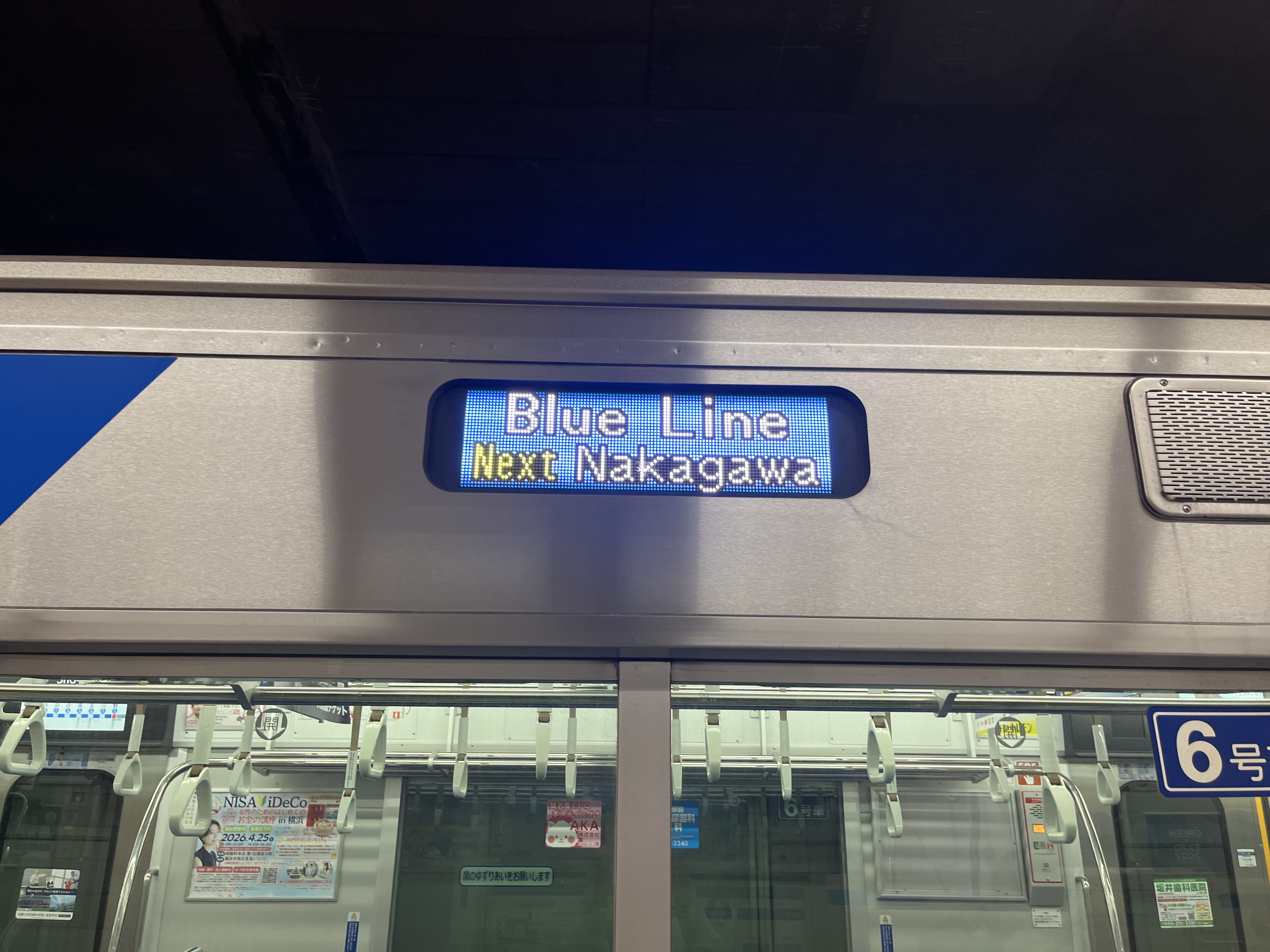
Side destination display

== Technical details ==
Construction is of stainless steel. Cars are 18 metres (59 ft 1 in) long (leading cars are 54 centimetres (1 ft 9 in) longer), 2,760 millimetres (9 ft 1 in) wide, and approximately 3.5 metres (11 ft 6 in) tall. The trains use a VVVF traction control system that allows for full regenerative braking. The trains have a maximum design speed of 90 kilometres per hour (56 mph) but are limited to 80 km/h (50 mph) during operation.

== History ==
On 13 December 2021, the Yokohama Municipal Subway announced that new trainsets would be purchased for the Blue Line, replacing the oldest 3000A series trainsets dating back to 1992.

The order was originally made in 2018 for a new batch of 3000V series trainsets but that plan was abandoned in favour of newer 4000 series cars.

As of 3 April 2022, five trainsets (30 vehicles) are to be commissioned in 2022 while the remaining three sets (18 vehicles) will enter service in 2023.

The first trainset entered service on 2 May 2022.

To replace the rest of the 3000S series series, eight sets of the second batch of 4000 series cars are scheduled to be introduced between 2027 and 2030. These cars will be manufactured by J-TREC.
