= Mitsuzawa-kamichō Station =

Metro station in Yokohama, Japan

Coordinates: 35°28′35.49″N 139°36′19.42″E

B22 Mitsuzawa-kamichō Station 三ツ沢上町駅
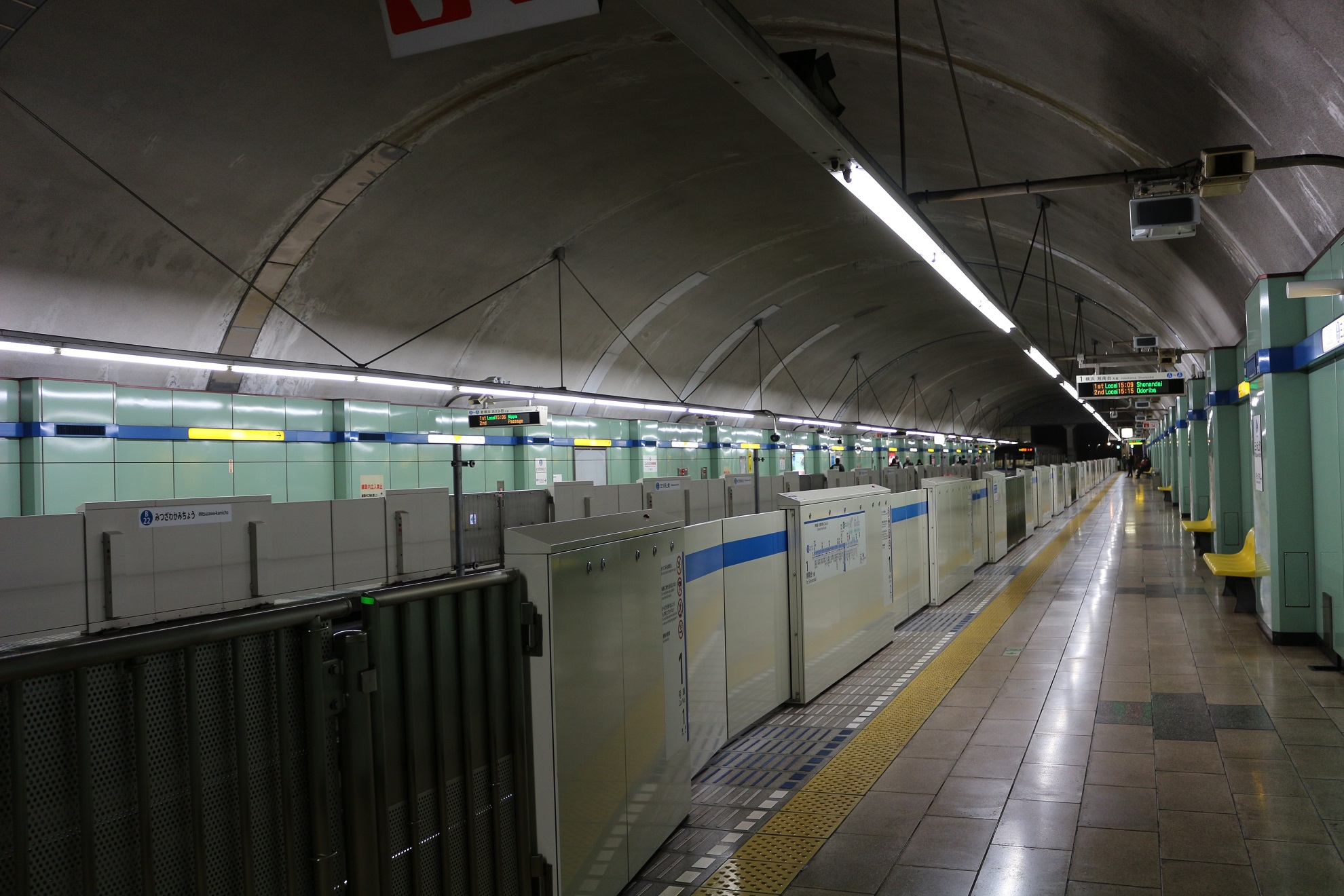
- Mitsuzawa-kamichō Station platform

General information
- Location: Mitsuzawa-kamichō 5-9, Kanagawa, Yokohama, Kanagawa （横浜市神奈川区三ツ沢上町5-9） Japan
- System: Yokohama Municipal Subway station
- Operator: Yokohama City Transportation Bureau
- Line: Blue Line
- Platforms: 2 side platforms
- Tracks: 2

Construction
- Depth: 30.5 m (100 ft)

Other information
- Station code: B22

History
- Opened: 14 March 1985; 41 years ago

Passengers
- 2008: 7,281 daily

Services
Preceding station	Yokohama Municipal Subway	Following station
Mitsuzawa-shimochō B21 towards Shonandai	Blue Line Local	Katakurachō B23 towards Azamino
Location
- Location within Yokohama Location within Kanagawa Prefecture Location within Japan

Mitsuzawa-kamichō Station (三ツ沢上町駅, Mitsuzawa-kamichō-eki) is an underground metro station located in Kanagawa-ku, Yokohama, Kanagawa, Japan operated by the Yokohama Municipal Subway’s Blue Line (Line 3). It is 24.8 kilometers from the terminus of the Blue Line at Shōnandai Station.

== Lines ==
- Yokohama Municipal Subway
  - Blue Line

== Station layout ==
Mitsuzawa-kamichō Station has a dual opposed side platforms serving two tracks, located five stories underground. The station was constructed at a depth of 30.5 m (100 ft) using the NATM method, with rounded tunnels unusual for Japanese metro systems.

=== Platforms ===
1	■ Blue Line (Yokohama)	Yokohama, Kannai, Totsuka, Shōnandai
2	■ Blue Line (Yokohama)	Shin-Yokohama, Azamino

== History ==
Mitsuzawa-kamichō Station was opened on 14 March 1985. Platform screen doors were installed in April 2007.

== Surrounding area ==
- Yokohama National University
- Mitsuzawa Park and Mitsuzawa Stadium
- Yokohama Municipal Hospital
- Bugenji Temple
- Mitsuzawa Cemetery
- Kanagawa Prefectural Yokohama Suiran High School
- Mitsuzawa Nursery School (Mitsuzawa Hoikuen)
