= Blue Line (Yokohama) =

Rapid transit line in Japan

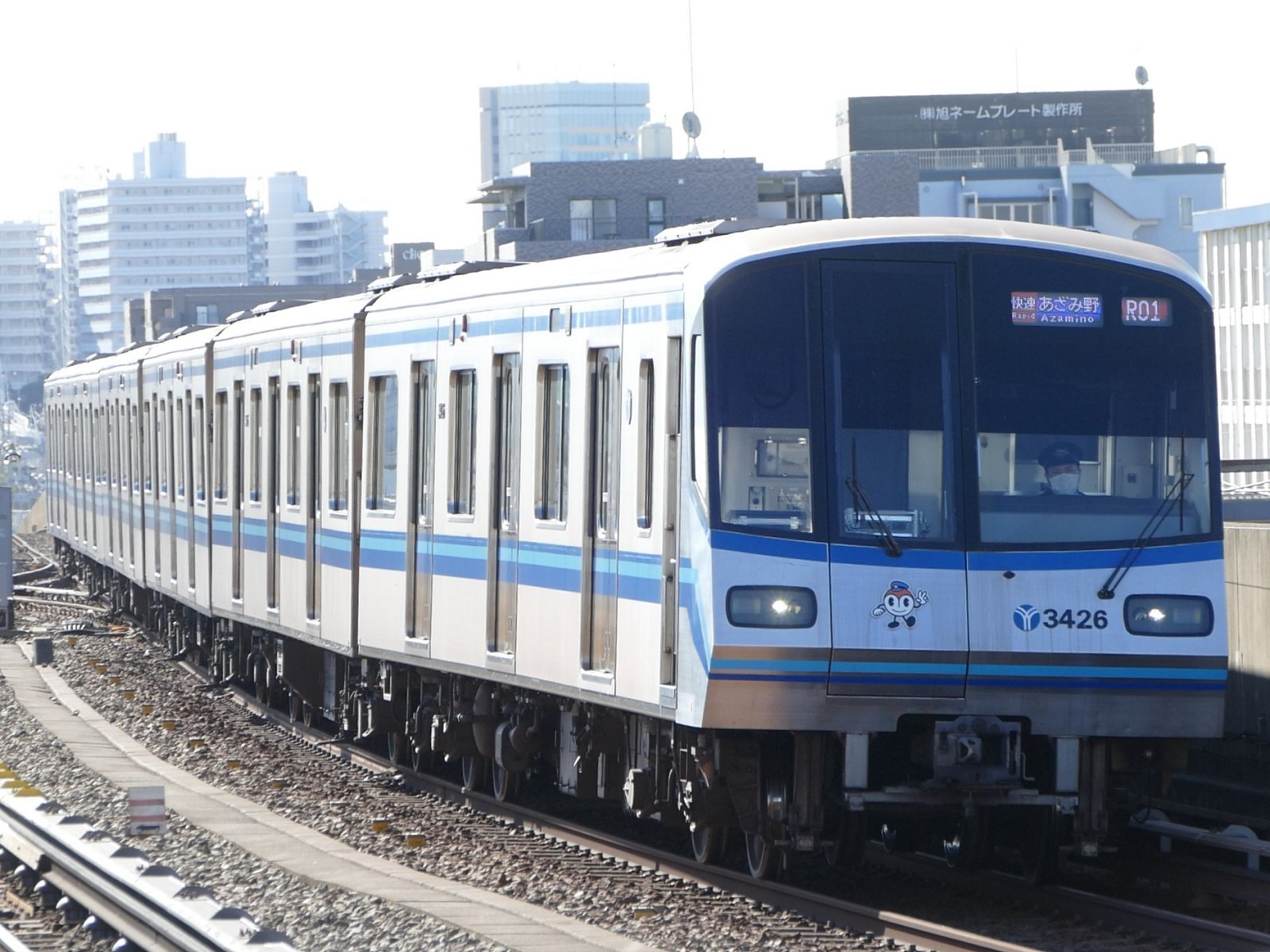
- A 3000R series train on the Blue Line in October 2019

Overview
- Native name: ブルーライン
- Owner: Yokohama City Transportation Bureau
- Line number: 1 & 3
- Locale: Yokohama, Fujisawa
- Termini: Shōnandai; Azamino
- Stations: 32

Service
- Type: Rapid transit
- System: Yokohama Municipal Subway
- Services: Line 1 (Shonandai–Kannai); Line 3 (Kannai–Azamino)
- Operator: Yokohama City Transportation Bureau
- Depot(s): Kaminagaya, Nippa
- Rolling stock: 3000 series 4000 series
- Daily ridership: 513,897 (FY2014)

History
- Opened: 16 December 1972; 53 years ago
- Last extension: 1999

Technical
- Line length: Total: 40.4 km (25.1 mi); Line 1: 19.7 km (12.2 mi); Line 3: 20.7 km (12.9 mi)
- Number of tracks: 2
- Track gauge: 1,435 mm (4 ft 8 1/2 in) standard gauge
- Electrification: Third rail, 750 V DC
- Operating speed: 80 km/h (50 mph)
Route map
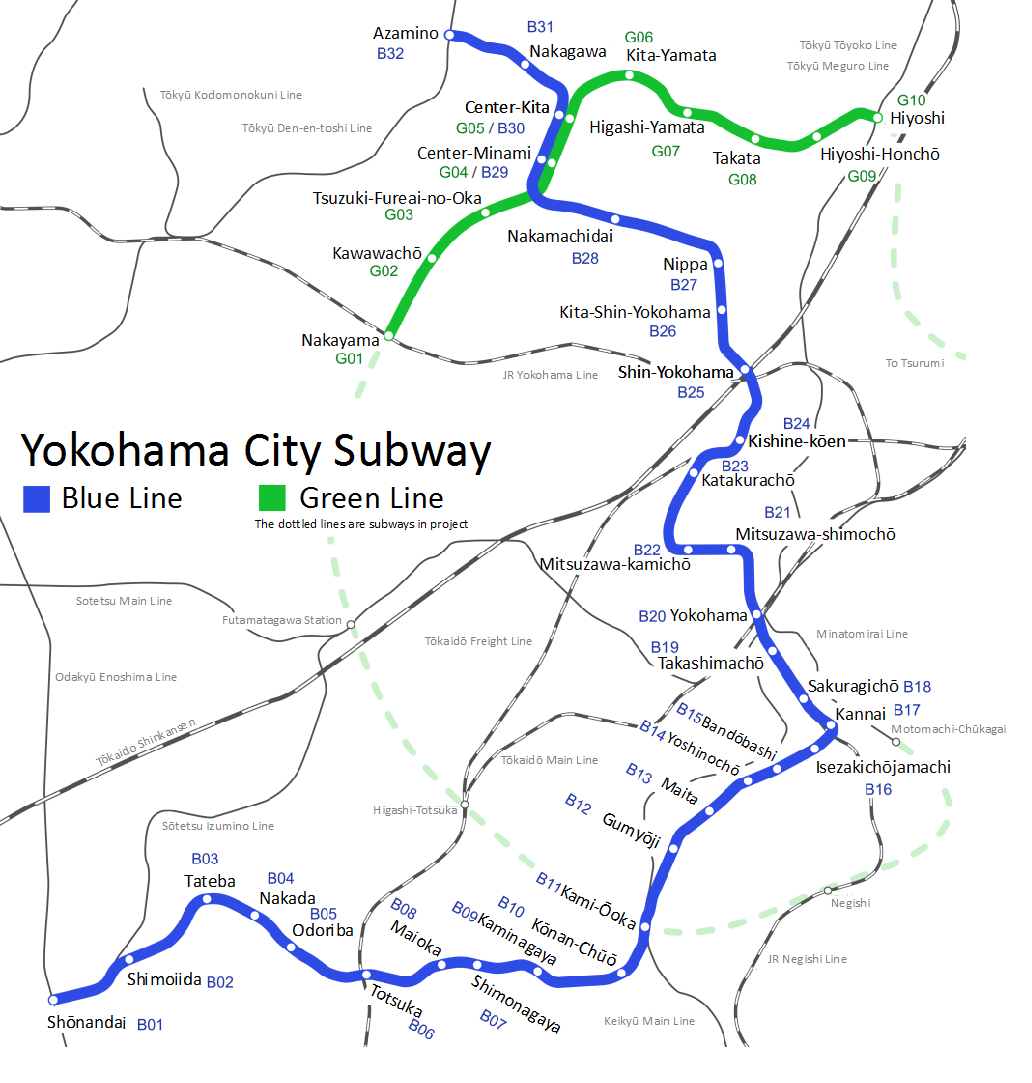

The Blue Line (Japanese: ブルーライン, Hepburn: Burū Rain) is a rapid transit line serving Yokohama in Kanagawa Prefecture, Japan. It is the longer of the two lines in the Yokohama Municipal Subway system operated by Yokohama City Transportation Bureau, and is the second-longest subway line in Japan at 40.4 kilometers (25.1 mi) in length, surpassed only by the 40.7-kilometer (25.3 mi) long Toei Oedo Line in Tokyo. Unlike most metro lines in Japan, it uses third rail for power instead of overhead lines. It is the most recent newly built steel-wheel railway line in Japan to do so.

The Blue Line is divided into two operating segments: Line 3 from Azamino in Aoba-ku, Yokohama to Kannai, and Line 1 from Kannai to Shōnandai in Fujisawa. Local and rapid services each operate as a single service across both lines.

Following the opening of the Green Line on 30 March 2008, the line was nicknamed the "Blue Line". The line color is blue and the line symbol used in the station numbering is B.

== Operations ==
=== Rapid ===
Rapid trains stop at all stations from Shonandai to Totsuka, and from Nippa to Azamino. Between Totsuka and Nippa, they only stop at Kaminagaya, Kamiooka, Kannai, Sakuragicho, Yokohama, and Shin-Yokohama. Essentially, rapid trains stop at only interchange stations and Kaminagaya in this section.

Rapid services began operating on 18 July 2015.

=== Local ===
During the daytime, there are two trains that direct the Shonandai station-Azamino station between 30 minutes, Odoriba Station-Azamino station and the Shonandai station-Nippa station, each of which is operated by one.

About the interval train to the Odoriba station is usually the meeting of the fast at the Kaminagaya station, usually at the Nippa station departure and take the rapid connection with the Nippa station of the first train terminal. There are a lot of Azamino trains which depart from the Nippa station and Kaminagaya station with the garage mainly in the early morning and midnight although the whole train becomes usual time zone excluding daytime, and many trains drive directly between the station-Shonandai station.

Moreover, there is one connected to Shonandai at the Kaminagaya station on the end of the terminal by the train which goes to Kaminagaya on a weekday, six on a Saturday holiday, and the Azamino departure. Although Blue■ is mainly used in the direction curtain display of the vehicle and the guidance of the station campus, it is not necessarily united in case of green■.

== Station list ==
- Local trains stop at all stations.
- Rapid trains stop at stations marked "●" and pass those marked "|".

Line	No.	Station	Distance in km (mi)	Rapid	Transfers	Location
3	B32	Azamino あざみ野	0 (0)	●	Den-en-toshi Line (DT16)	Aoba-ku, Yokohama
3	B31	Nakagawa 中川	1.5 (0.93)	●		Tsuzuki-ku, Yokohama
3	B30	Center Kita センター北	3.1 (1.9)	●	Green Line (G05)	Tsuzuki-ku, Yokohama
3	B29	Center Minami センター南	4.0 (2.5)	●	Green Line (G04)	Tsuzuki-ku, Yokohama
3	B28	Nakamachidai 仲町台	6.3 (3.9)	●		Tsuzuki-ku, Yokohama
3	B27	Nippa 新羽	8.6 (5.3)	●		Kōhoku-ku, Yokohama
3	B26	Kita Shin-Yokohama 北新横浜	9.6 (6.0)	|		Kōhoku-ku, Yokohama
3	B25	Shin-Yokohama 新横浜	10.9 (6.8)	●	Tokaido Shinkansen; Yokohama Line (JH16); Tōkyū Shin-Yokohama Line (SH01); Sōtetsu Shin-Yokohama Line (SO52)	Kōhoku-ku, Yokohama
3	B24	Kishine-kōen 岸根公園	12.5 (7.8)	|		Kōhoku-ku, Yokohama
3	B23	Katakurachō 片倉町	13.7 (8.5)	|		Kanagawa-ku, Yokohama
3	B22	Mitsuzawa-kamichō 三ツ沢上町	15.6 (9.7)	|		Kanagawa-ku, Yokohama
3	B21	Mitsuzawa-shimochō 三ツ沢下町	16.5 (10.3)	|		Kanagawa-ku, Yokohama
3	B20	Yokohama 横浜	17.9 (11.1)	●	Tōkaidō Line (JT05); Yokosuka Line (JO13); Keihin–Tōhoku Line (JK12); Yokohama Line (JK12); Keihin–Tōhoku Line (JK12); Main Line (KK37); Tōyoko Line (TY21); Sōtetsu Main Line (SO01); Minatomirai Line (MM01)	Nishi-ku, Yokohama
3	B19	Takashimachō 高島町	18.8 (11.7)	|		Nishi-ku, Yokohama
3	B18	Sakuragichō 桜木町	20.0 (12.4)	●	Negishi Line (JK11)	Naka-ku, Yokohama
3	B17	Kannai 関内	20.7 (12.9)	●	Negishi Line (JK10)	Naka-ku, Yokohama
1	B17	Kannai 関内	20.7 (12.9)	●	Negishi Line (JK10)	Naka-ku, Yokohama
1	B16	Isezakichōjamachi 伊勢佐木長者町	21.4 (13.3)	|		Naka-ku, Yokohama
1	B15	Bandōbashi 阪東橋	22.3 (13.9)	|		Minami-ku, Yokohama
1	B14	Yoshinochō 吉野町	22.8 (14.2)	|		Minami-ku, Yokohama
1	B13	Maita 蒔田	23.9 (14.9)	|		Minami-ku, Yokohama
1	B12	Gumyōji 弘明寺	25.0 (15.5)	|		Minami-ku, Yokohama
1	B11	Kami-Ōoka 上大岡	26.6 (16.5)	●	Main Line (KK44)	Kōnan-ku, Yokohama
1	B10	Kōnan-Chūō 港南中央	27.7 (17.2)	|		Kōnan-ku, Yokohama
1	B09	Kaminagaya 上永谷	29.4 (18.3)	●		Kōnan-ku, Yokohama
1	B08	Shimonagaya 下永谷	30.7 (19.1)	|		Kōnan-ku, Yokohama
1	B07	Maioka 舞岡	31.4 (19.5)	|		Totsuka-ku, Yokohama
1	B06	Totsuka 戸塚	33.0 (20.5)	●	Tōkaidō Line (JT06); Yokosuka Line (JO10); Shōnan–Shinjuku Line (JS10)	Totsuka-ku, Yokohama
1	B05	Odoriba 踊場	34.7 (21.6)	●		Izumi-ku, Yokohama
1	B04	Nakada 中田	35.6 (22.1)	●		Izumi-ku, Yokohama
1	B03	Tateba 立場	36.7 (22.8)	●		Izumi-ku, Yokohama
1	B02	Shimoiida 下飯田	38.8 (24.1)	●		Izumi-ku, Yokohama
1	B01	Shōnandai 湘南台	40.4 (25.1)	●	Enoshima Line (OE09); Sōtetsu Izumino Line (SO37)	Fujisawa, Kanagawa

== Rolling stock ==
- 3000 series 37 × six-car EMUs (since 1992)

As of 1 April 2016, the line is operated using a fleet of 37 six-car 3000 series EMUs based at Kaminagaya Depot. The fleet is subdivided into eight first-batch 3000A series sets (numbered 24 to 31), seven-second-batch 3000N series sets (numbered 32 to 38), fourteen third-batch 3000R series sets (numbered 39 to 52), and eight fourth-batch 3000S series sets (numbered 53 to 60).

A fifth-batch 3000V series six-car set entered service on the line on 9 April 2017.

- 4000 series 8 × EMUs (to be introduced from 2022)

The 4000 series began appearing in service on 2 May 2022.

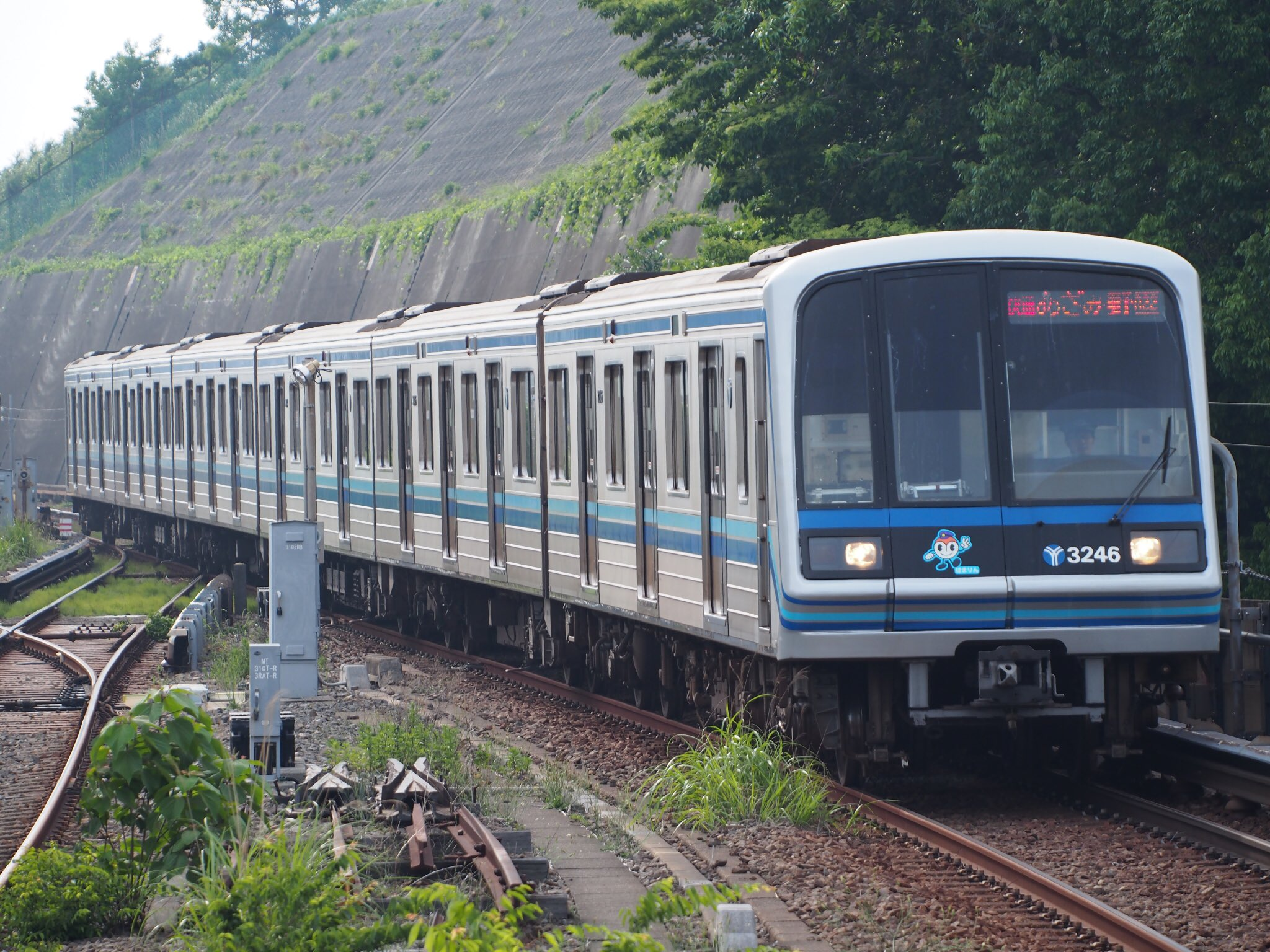
3000A series set 30 in September 2010

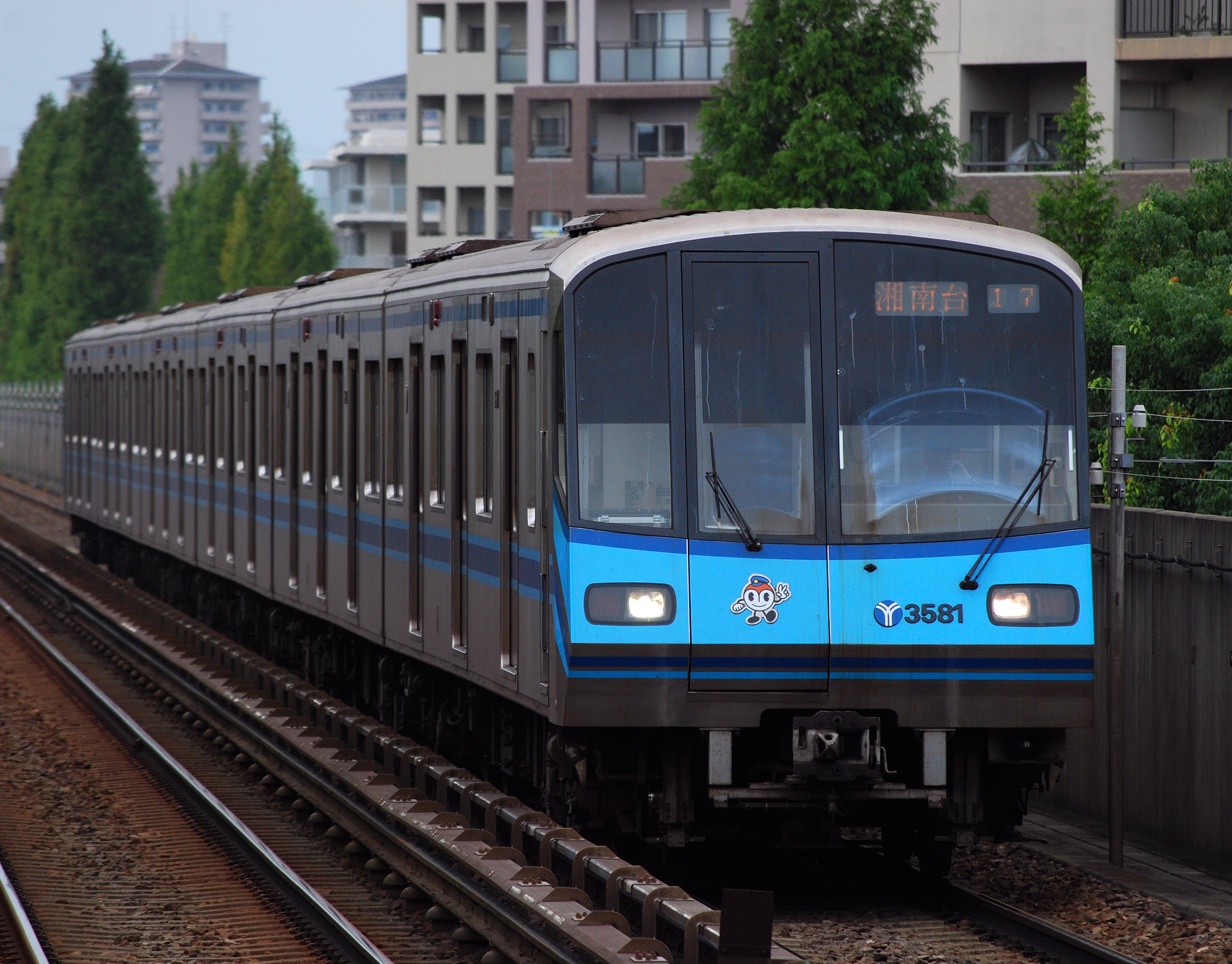
3000S series set 58 in September 2010

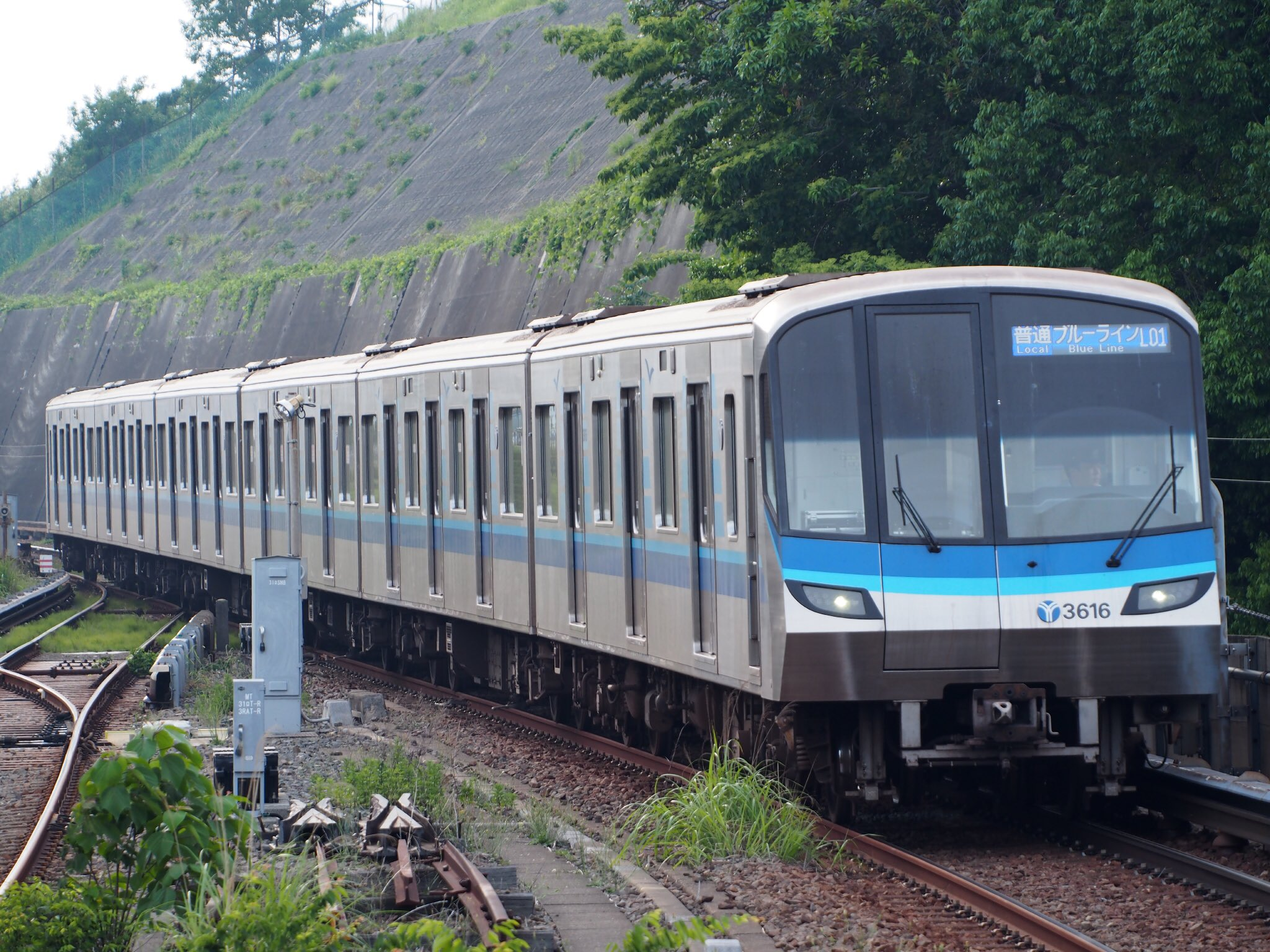
3000V series set 61 in April 2017

=== Former ===
- 1000 series 14 × 6-car EMUs (from December 1972 until November 2006)
- 2000 series 9 × 6-car EMUs (from 1984 until November 2006)
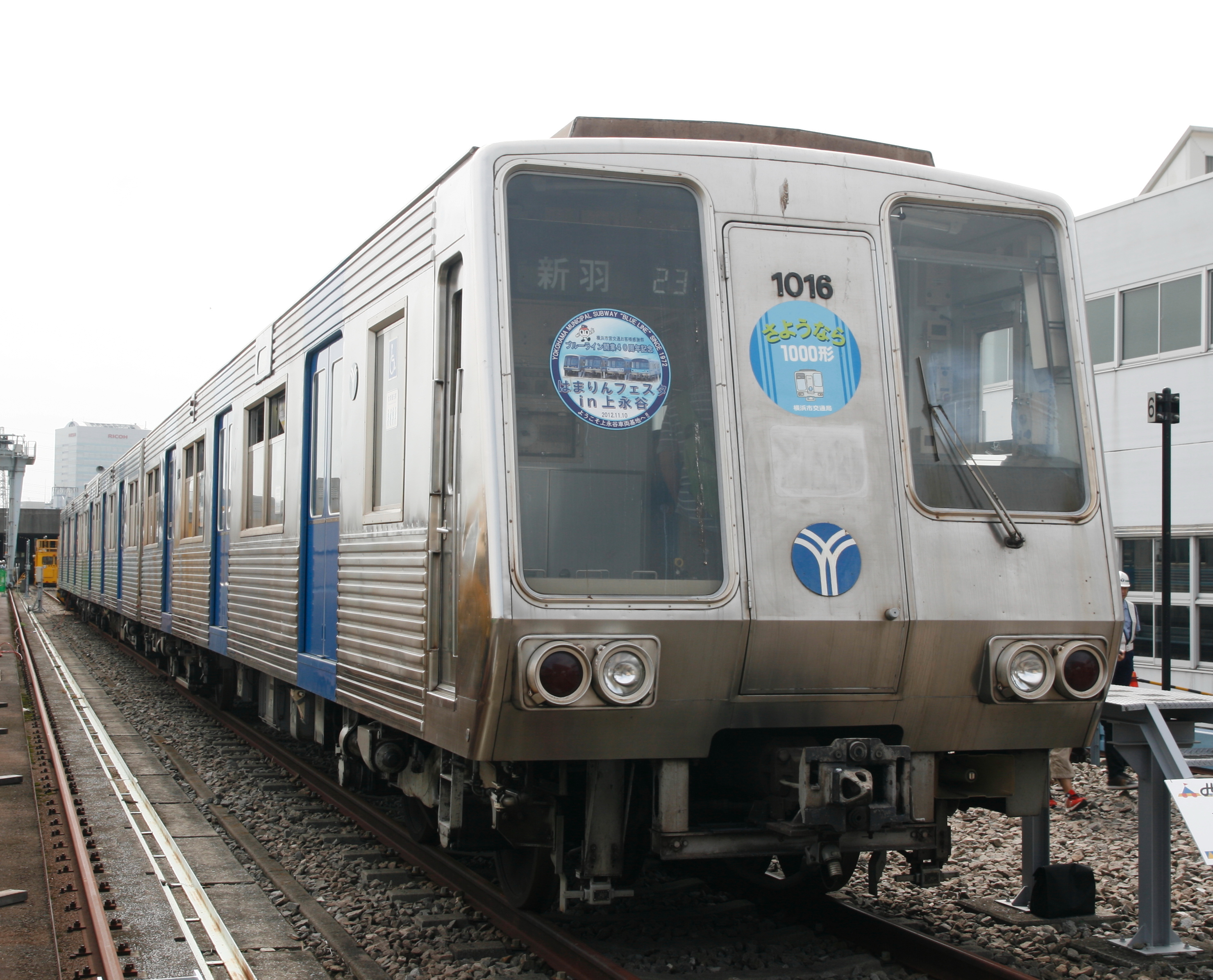
Preserved 1000 series EMU set 01 in October 2014

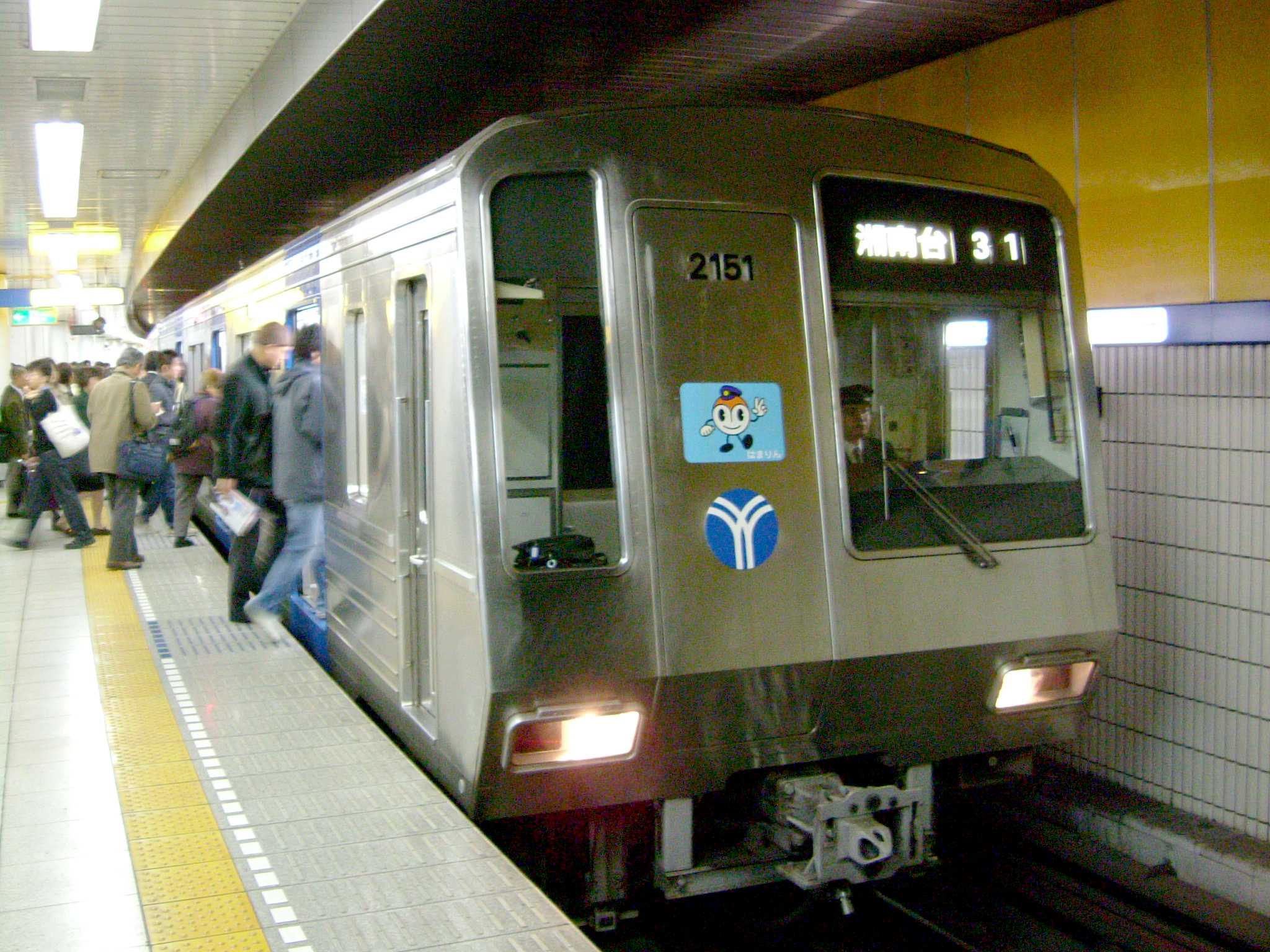
2000 series set 15 in March 2004

== History ==
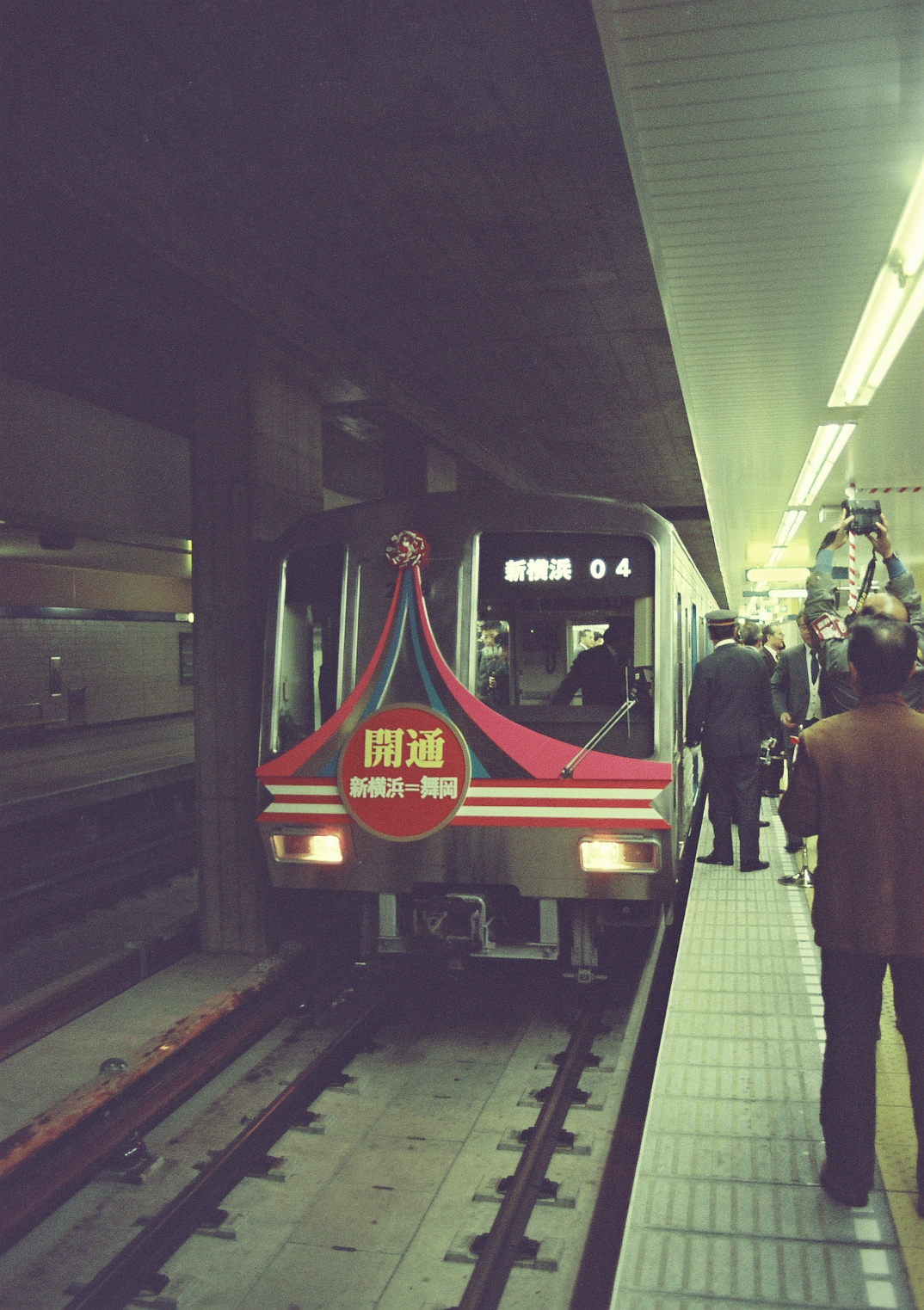
A train celebrating the extensions to Shin-Yokohama and Maioka in March 1985

In 1965, construction of Line 1 and Line 3 began. The subway was inaugurated on 16 September 1972, when the 5.2 km (3.2 mi) long initial section of Line 1 opened between Kami-Ōoka and Isezakichōjamachi stations. On 4 September 1976, Line 1 was extended in both directions: 2.8 km (1.7 mi) and 2 stations to the southwest (from Kami-Ōoka to Kaminagaya), and 0.7 km (0.43 mi) and 1 station to the north (from Isezakichōjamachi to Kannai); the 2.8 km (1.7 mi) long initial section of Line 3 between Kannai and Yokohama also opened that same day and through services between Line 1 and Line 3 began.

On 14 March 1985, two extensions opened: a 7.0 km (4.3 mi), 5 station extension of Line 3 from Yokohama to Shin-Yokohama, and a 2.0 km (1.2 mi), 2 station extension of Line 1 from Kaminagaya to Maioka. Line 1 would be extended by one station to Totsuka (a distance of 1.7 km (1.1 mi)) on 27 August 1989; a temporary station was in operation at that location from 24 May 1987 until that date. The most recent extension of Line 3, a 10.9 km (6.8 mi) section from Shin-Yokohama to Azamino opened on 18 March 1993. The final 7.4 km (4.6 mi) section of Line 1 from Totsuka to Shōnandai opened on 28 August 1999.

From July 2015, limited-stop "Rapid" services were introduced on the line, with approximately two services operating per hour during the daytime off-peak. Journey times over the entire length of the line were reduced by up to 10 minutes from the 1 hour 7 minutes taken by all-stations services. From 4 March 2017, the intervals between rapid trains was decreased to 20 minutes.

On 21 January 2020, Yokohama City and Kawasaki City announced the route and four new stations for the planned 6.5 km (4.0 mi) extension from Azamino to Shin-Yurigaoka Station on the Odakyū Odawara Line. Construction of this section is expected to complete by 2030. In June 2020, the Transportation Bureau started environmental impact assessment procedures of the extension project.
