= Yokohama Municipal Subway 3000 series =

Japanese train type

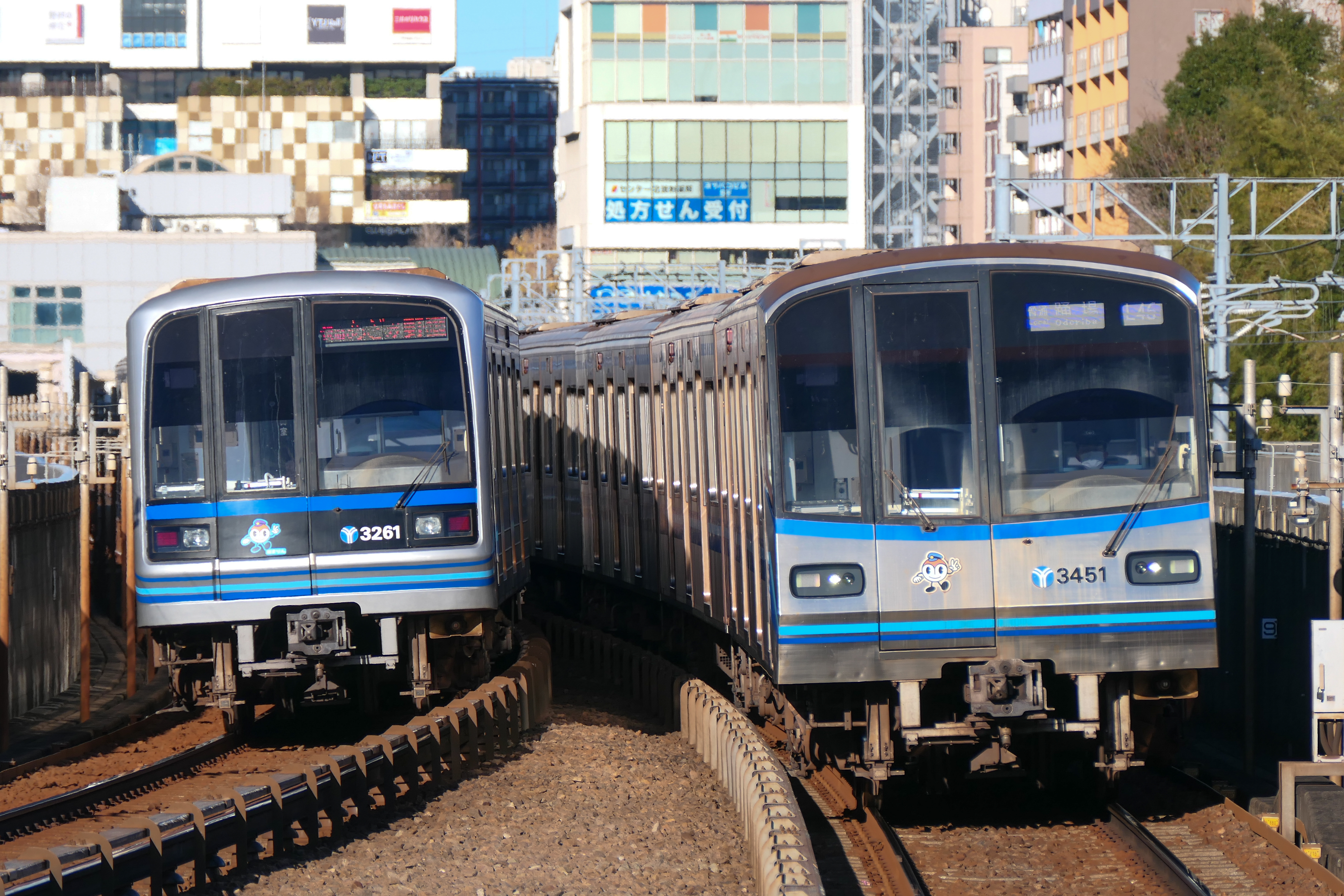
- 3000A series set 26 (left) and 3000R series set 45 (right), December 2021
- Constructed: 1992–
- Entered service: 1992
- Number built: 228 vehicles (38 sets)
- Number in service: 216 vehicles (36 sets) (as of April 2020)
- Number scrapped: 12 vehicles (2 sets; accident damage)
- Formation: 6 cars per trainset
- Fleet numbers: 24–61
- Operators: Yokohama City Transportation Bureau
- Depots: Kaminagaya
- Lines served: Yokohama Municipal Subway Blue Line

Specifications
- Car body construction: Stainless steel
- Car length: 18.04 m (59 ft 2 in) (end cars); 17.5 m (57 ft 5 in) (intermediate cars)
- Width: 2.76 m (9 ft 1 in)
- Height: 3.54 m (11 ft 7 in)
- Floor height: 1.04 m (3 ft 5 in)
- Doors: 3 pairs per side
- Maximum speed: 90 km/h (55 mph)
- Traction system: Mitsubishi Electric VVVF drive
- Traction motors: 16 × Mitsubishi 140 kW (190 hp) 3-phase AC induction motor
- Power output: 2.24 MW (3,000 hp)
- Acceleration: 0.89 m/s^{2} (2.9 ft/s^{2})
- Deceleration: 0.97 m/s^{2} (3.2 ft/s^{2}) (service); 1.3 m/s^{2} (4.3 ft/s^{2}) (emergency)
- Electric system(s): 750 V DC third rail
- Current collection: Contact shoe
- Safety system(s): ATC/ATO
- Track gauge: 1,435 mm (4 ft 8 1/2 in) standard gauge

The Yokohama Municipal Subway 3000 series (横浜市交通局3000形) is a commuter electric multiple unit (EMU) train type operated by the Yokohama City Transportation Bureau on the Yokohama Municipal Subway Blue Line in Japan since 1992.

== Variants ==
The type is subdivided into the following variants, each formed as 6-car sets.

- 3000A series: 8 sets, introduced in 1992
- 3000N series: 7 sets, introduced in 1999
- 3000R series: 14 sets, introduced in 2004
- 3000S series: 8 sets, introduced in 2006
- 3000V series: 1 set, introduced in April 2017

== 3000A series ==
3000A series
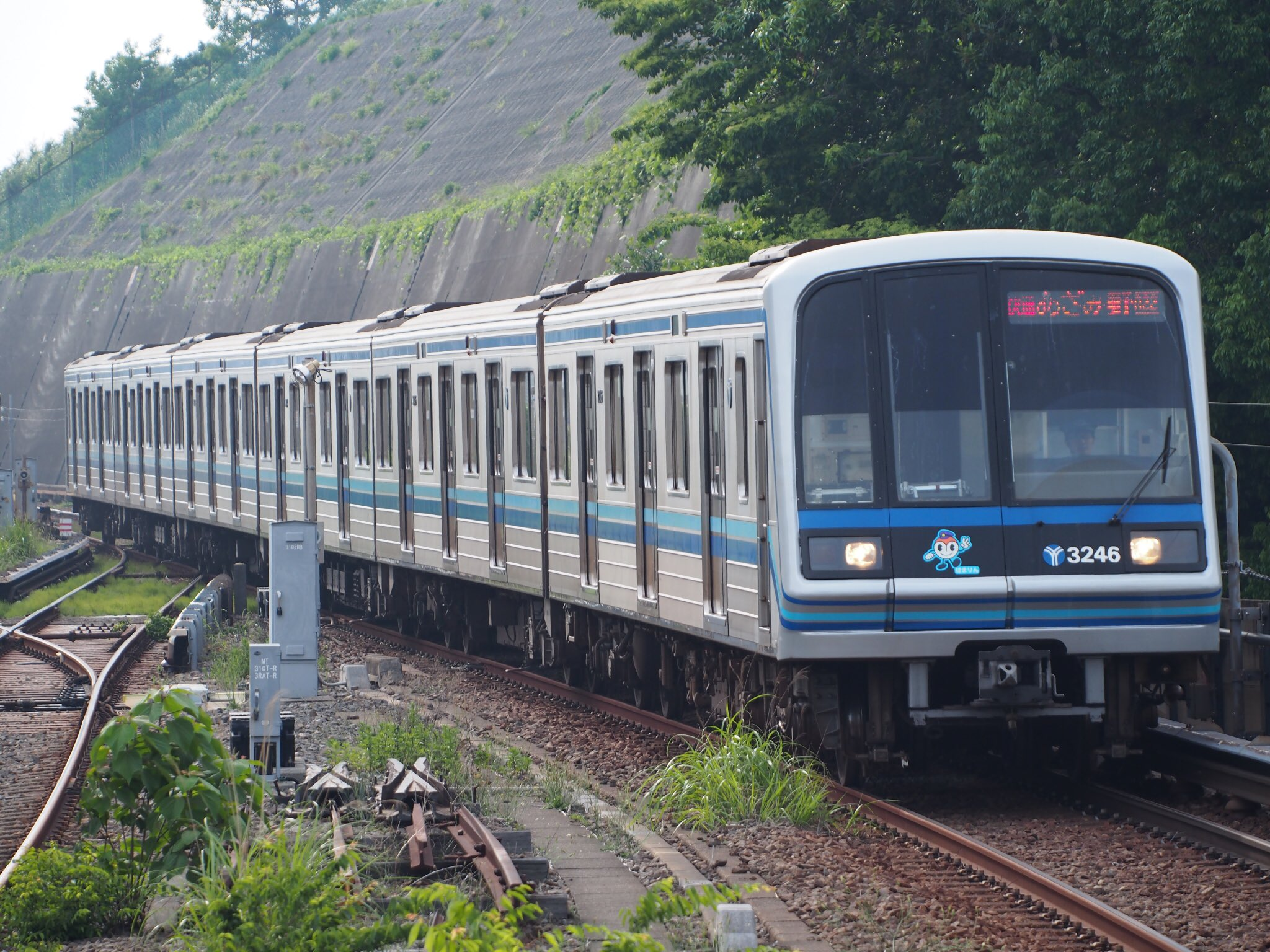
- 3000A series set 24 in May 2019
- Manufacturer: Tokyu Car Corporation
- Entered service: 1992
- Number built: 48 vehicles (8 sets)
- Number in service: 48 vehicles (8 sets) (as of 1 April 2016)
- Successor: 4000 series
- Fleet numbers: 24–31

Specifications
- Traction system: MAP-148-75V32 GTO–VVVF
- Traction motors: SEA-331

The 3000A series trainsets were introduced from 1992. They are due to be replaced by new 4000 series EMUs from 2022.

=== Formation ===
As of 1 April 2016, eight six-car sets (24 to 31) are in service, formed as follows, with car 1 at the Shonandai end.

Car No.	1	2	3	4	5	6
Designation	Tc1	M2	M3	M4	M5	Tc6
Numbering	3xx1	3xx2	3xx3	3xx4	3xx5	3xx6

=== Interior ===
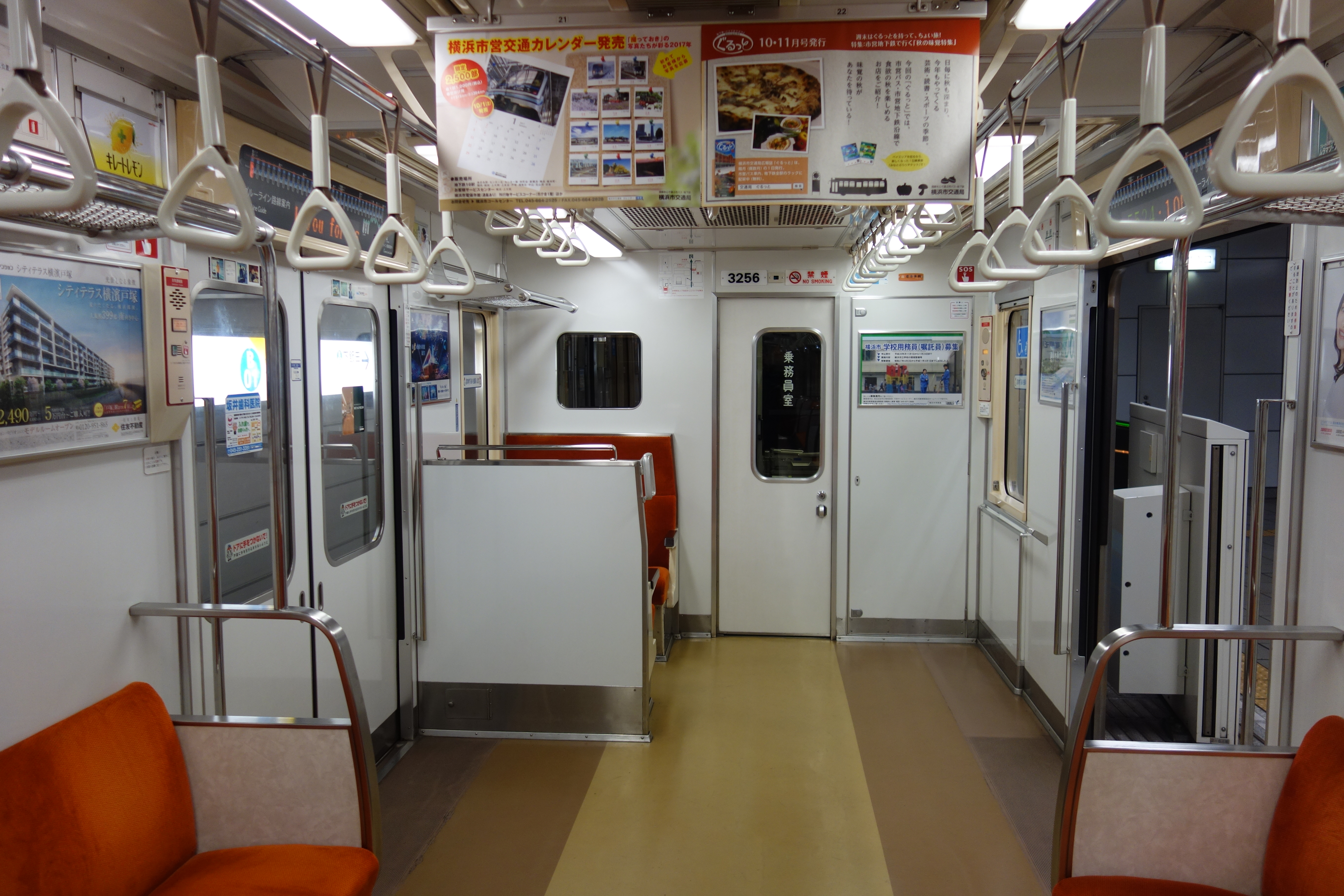
Interior of a 3000A series set

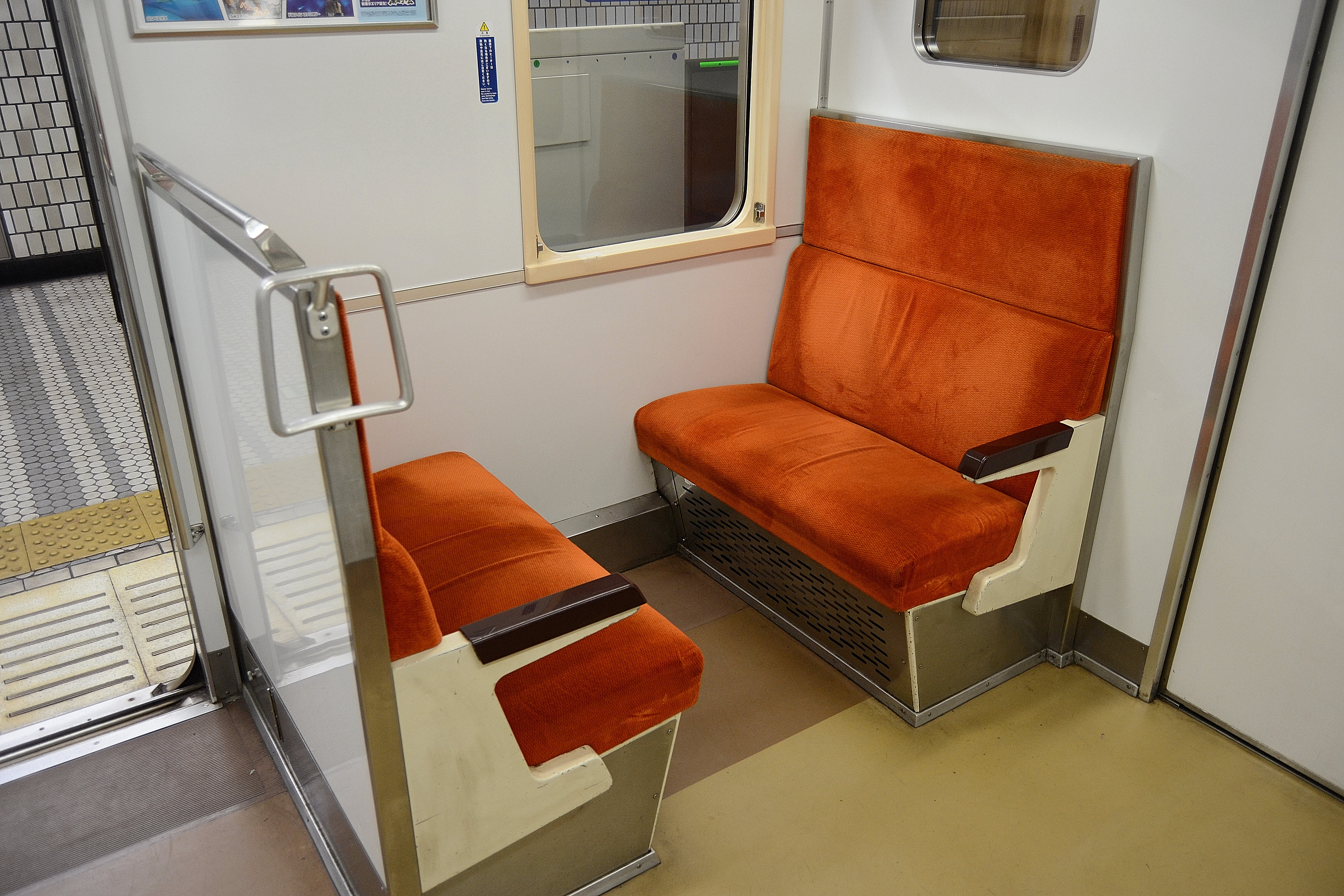
A transverse seating bay immediately behind the driver's cab in a 3000A series train

== 3000N series ==
3000N series
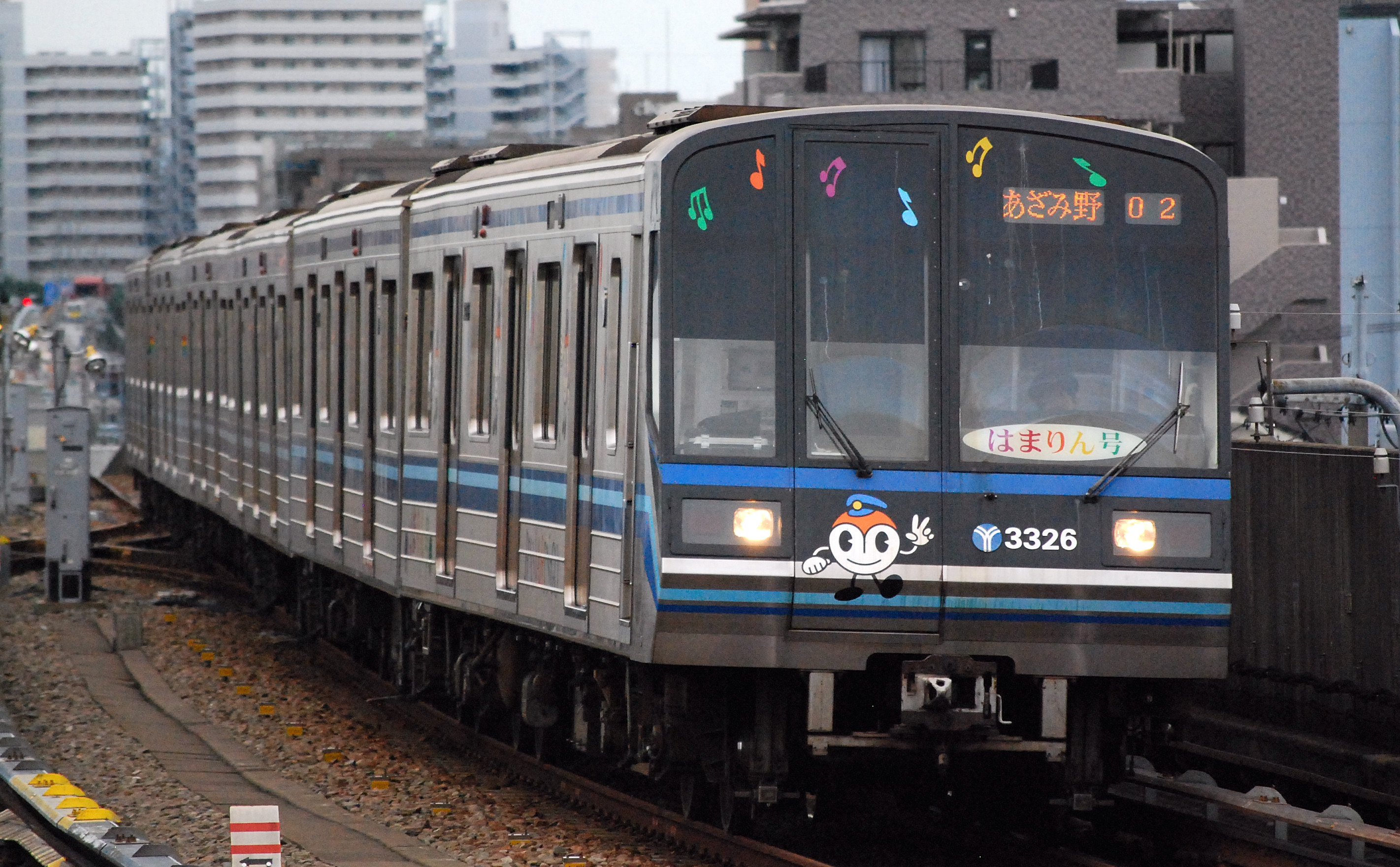
- 3000N series set 32 in September 2010
- Manufacturer: Tokyu Car Corporation
- Entered service: 1999
- Number built: 42 vehicles (7 sets)
- Number in service: 36 vehicles (6 sets) (as of 1 April 2020)
- Number scrapped: 6 vehicles (set 38; accident damage)
- Fleet numbers: 32 - 38

Specifications
- Traction system: MAP-148-75V77 IGBT–VVVF
- Traction motors: MB-5080-A

The 3000N series trainsets were introduced from 1999, and featured a new front-end design, while retaining the ribbed stainless body construction of the earlier 3000A series trains.

=== Formation ===
As of 1 April 2016, seven six-car sets (32 to 38) are in service, formed as follows, with car 1 at the Shonandai end.

Car No.	1	2	3	4	5	6
Designation	Tc1	M2	M3	M4	M5	Tc6
Numbering	3xx1	3xx2	3xx3	3xx4	3xx5	3xx6

== 3000R series ==
3000R series
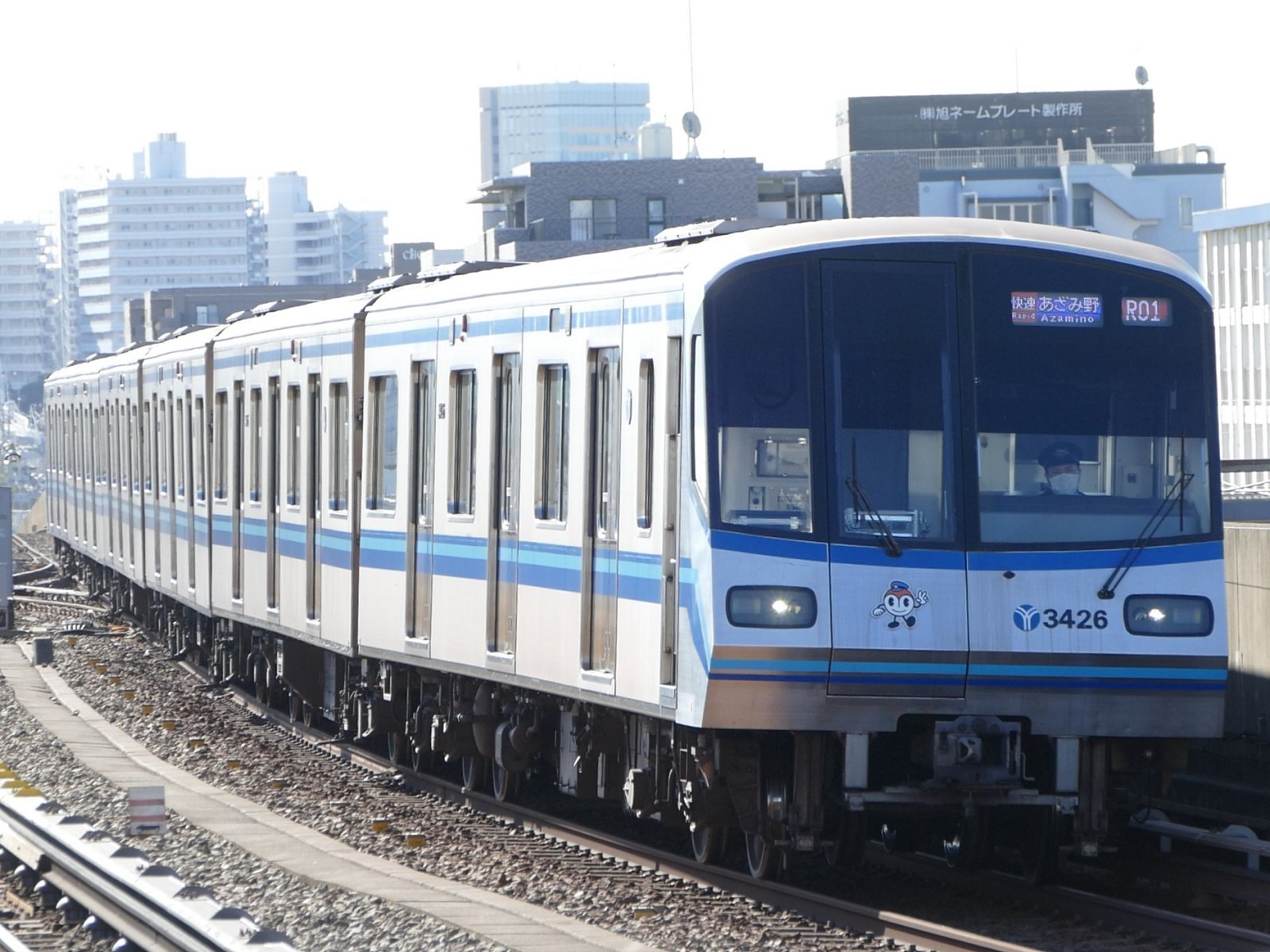
- 3000R series set 42 in October 2019
- Manufacturer: Nippon Sharyo
- Number built: 84 vehicles (14 sets)
- Number in service: 84 vehicles (14 sets) (as of 1 April 2016)
- Fleet numbers: 39 - 52

Specifications
- Traction system: MAP-148-75V77A IGBT–VVVF
- Traction motors: MB-5080-A

The 3000R series trainsets were introduced from 2004 to replace the ageing 1000 series sets. These trains have stainless steel bodies with smooth sides.

=== Formation ===
As of 1 April 2016, 14 six-car sets (39 to 52) are in service, formed as follows, with car 1 at the Shonandai end.

Car No.	1	2	3	4	5	6
Designation	Tc1	M2	M3	M4	M5	Tc6
Numbering	3xx1	3xx2	3xx3	3xx4	3xx5	3xx6
Weight (t)	30	35	33	33	33	30
Capacity (total)	122	133	133	133	133	122

=== Interior ===
Passenger accommodation consists of longitudinal seating throughout.

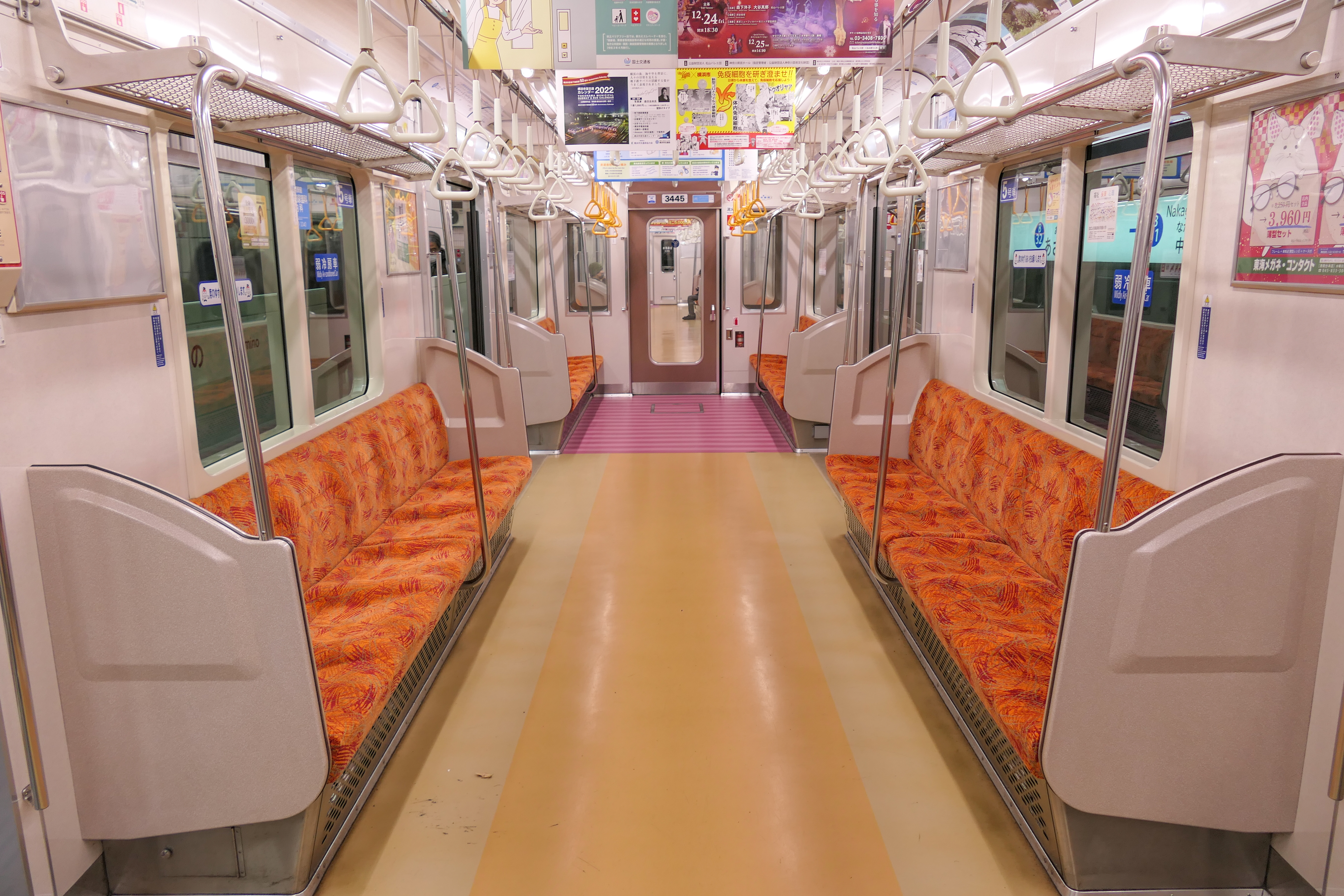
Interior view

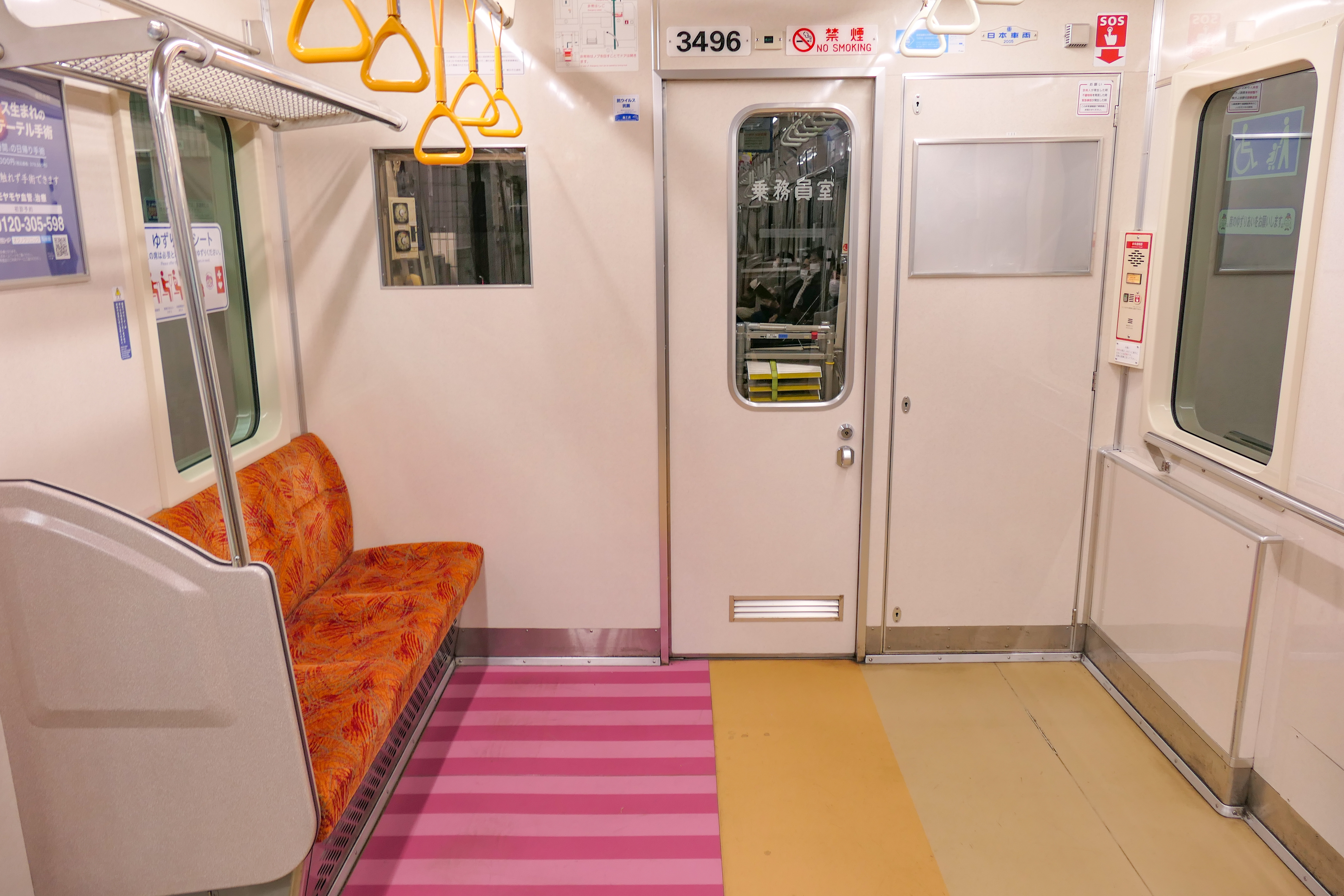
Priority seating

== 3000S series ==
3000S series
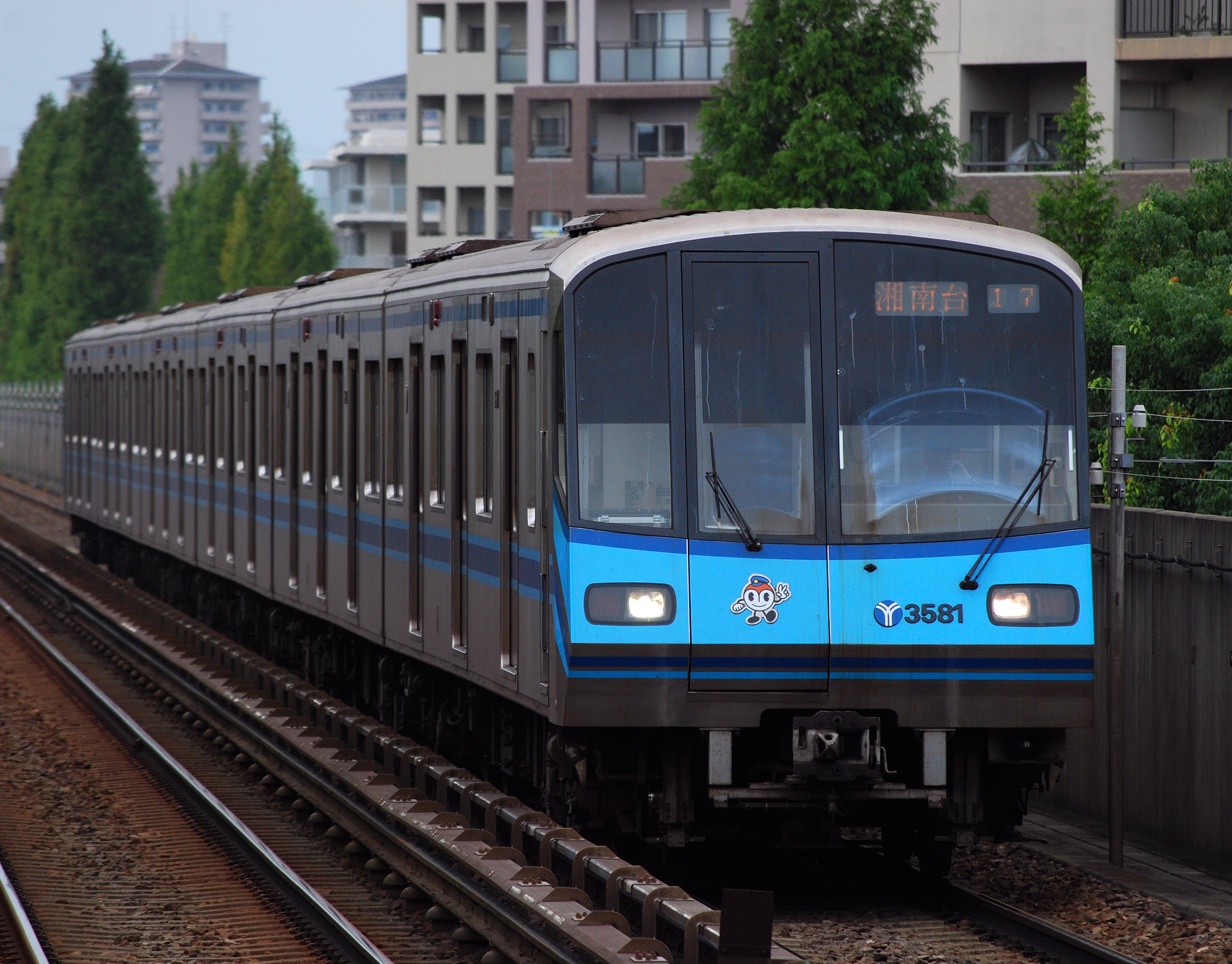
- 3000S series set 58 in September 2010
- Manufacturer: Nippon Sharyo
- Number built: 48 vehicles (8 sets)
- Number in service: 42 vehicles (7 sets) (as of 1 April 2020)
- Number scrapped: 6 vehicles (set 53; accident damage)
- Fleet numbers: 53 - 60

Specifications
- Traction system: MAP-148-75V77A IGBT–VVVF
- Traction motors: MB-5080-A

The 3000S series trainsets were introduced from 2006, and were built with same body design as the earlier 3000R series trains, but using the bogies, brakes, and ATC equipment from withdrawn 2000 series trainsets.

=== Formation ===
As of 1 April 2016, eight six-car sets (53 to 60) are in service, formed as follows, with car 1 at the Shonandai end.

Car No.	1	2	3	4	5	6
Designation	Tc1	M2	M3	M4	M5	Tc6
Numbering	3xx1	3xx2	3xx3	3xx4	3xx5	3xx6

== 3000V series ==
3000V series
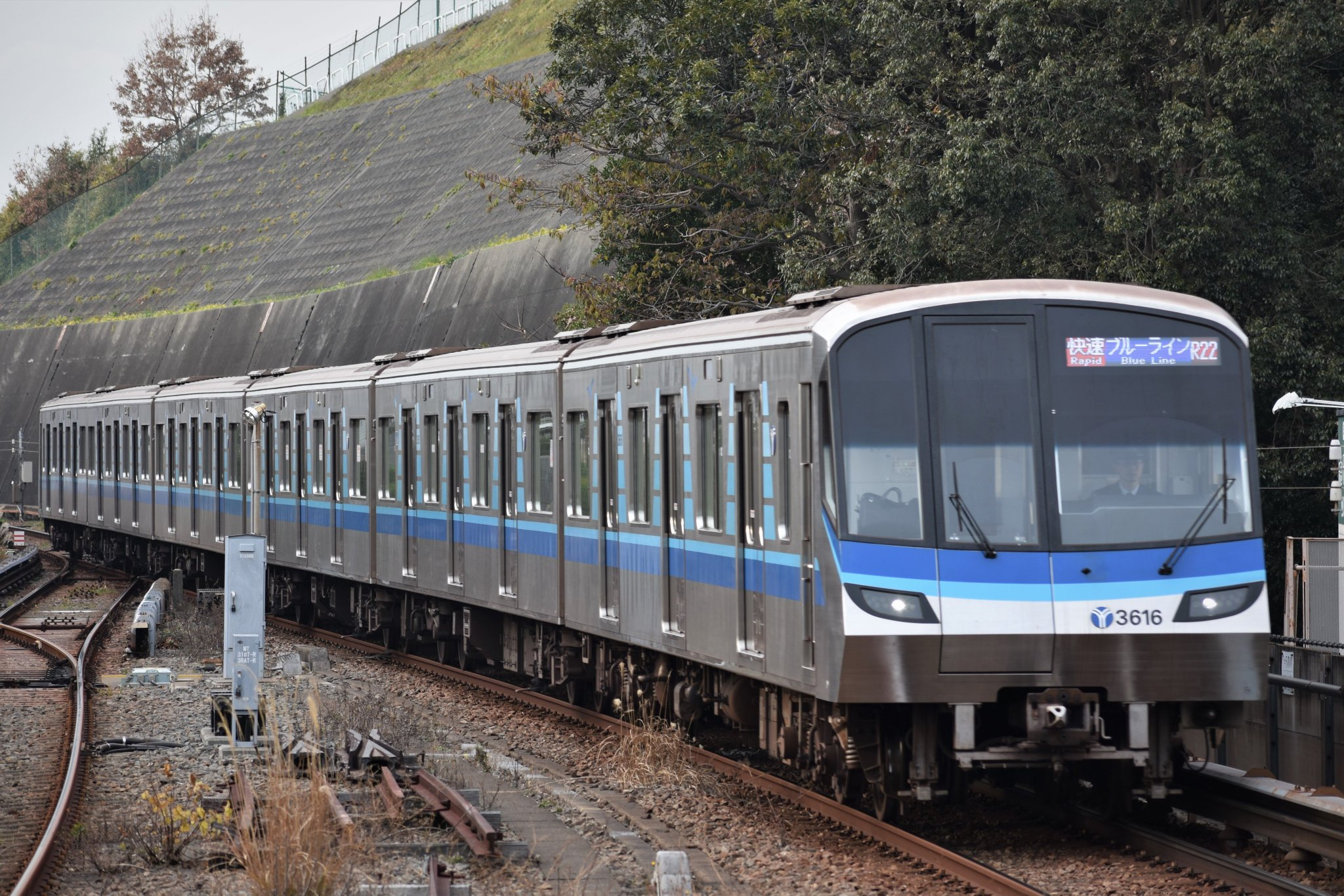
- 3000V series set 61 in December 2019
- Manufacturer: Nippon Sharyo
- Entered service: April 2017
- Number built: 6 vehicles (1 set) (as of April 2017)
- Number in service: 6 vehicles (1 set)
- Fleet numbers: 61

Specifications
- Traction system: MAP-148-75V303 SiC hybrid IGBT–VVVF
- Traction motors: MB-5170-A

Introduced in April 2017, the 3000V series is based on the earlier 3000R series design. The "V" classification was chosen using the Roman numeral for "5", as the 3000V series represents the fifth batch of 3000 series trains.

The first 3000V series set (61) entered service on 9 April 2017. A total of seven sets were scheduled to be introduced by 2022 to replace the earlier 3000A series trainsets. However this plan was abandoned in favour of newer 4000 series cars.

=== Formation ===
As of April 2017, one six-car set (61) is in service, formed as follows, with car 1 at the Shonandai end.

Car No.	1	2	3	4	5	6
Designation	Tc1	M2	M3	M4	M5	Tc6
Numbering	3xx1	3xx2	3xx3	3xx4	3xx5	3xx6
Weight (t)	32.0	35.5	33.5	35.5	34.0	31.5
Capacity (total)	122	133	133	133	133	122

=== Interior ===
Passenger accommodation consists of longitudinal seating throughout, with sculpted bench seats providing a width of 46 cm (18 in) per passenger. Each car has a space for wheelchairs and pushchairs.
