= Mitsuzawa-shimochō Station =

Metro station in Yokohama, Japan

Coordinates: 35°28′35.44″N 139°36′53.26″E

B21 Misuzawa-shimochō Station 三ツ沢下町駅
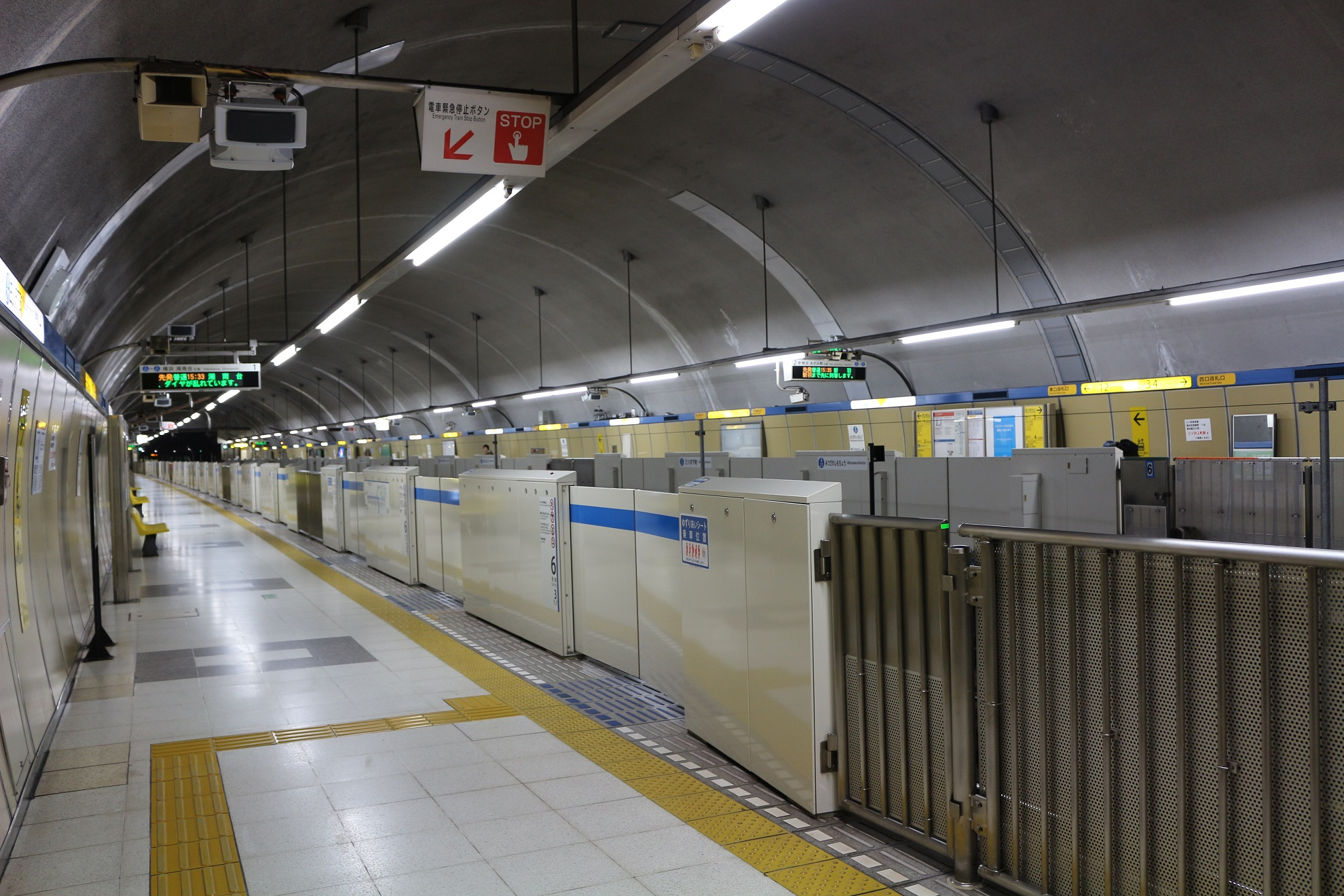
- Misuzawa-shimochō Station platforms

General information
- Location: Misuzawa-shimochō 2-16, Kanagawa, Yokohama, Kanagawa （横浜市神奈川区三ツ沢下町2-16） Japan
- System: Yokohama Municipal Subway station
- Operator: Yokohama City Transportation Bureau
- Line: Blue Line
- Platforms: 2 side platforms
- Tracks: 2

Other information
- Station code: B21

History
- Opened: March 14, 1985; 41 years ago

Passengers
- 2008: 5,780 daily

Services
Preceding station	Yokohama Municipal Subway	Following station
Yokohama B20 towards Shonandai	Blue Line Local	Mitsuzawa-kamichō B22 towards Azamino
Location
- Location within Yokohama Location within Kanagawa Prefecture Location within Japan

Misuzawa-shimochō Station (三ツ沢下町駅, Misuzawa-shimochō-eki) is an underground metro station located in Kanagawa-ku, Yokohama, Kanagawa Prefecture, Japan operated by the Yokohama Municipal Subway’s Blue Line (Line 3). It is 23.9 kilometers from the terminus of the Blue Line at Shōnandai Station.

== Lines ==
- Yokohama Municipal Subway
  - Blue Line

== Station layout ==
Misuzawa-shimochō Station has a dual opposed side platforms serving two tracks, located five stories underground. The station was constructed using the NATM method, with rounded tunnels unusual for Japanese metro systems.

=== Platforms ===
1	■ Blue Line (Yokohama)	Yokohama, Kannai, Totsuka, Shōnandai
2	■ Blue Line (Yokohama)	Shin-Yokohama, Azamino

== History ==
Misuzawa-shimochō Station was opened on 14 March 1985. Platform screen doors were installed in April 2007.

== Surrounding area ==
- St. Andrew's Cathedral
- Yokohama Orthodox Church
- Evangelical Lutheran Church Yokohama
- Soshin Girls' School
- Mitsuzawa Nursery School(Mitsuzawa Hoikuen)
