= Nakamachidai Station =

Metro station in Yokohama, Japan

Coordinates: 35°32′07.11″N 139°35′22.14″E

B28 Nakamachidai Station 仲町台駅
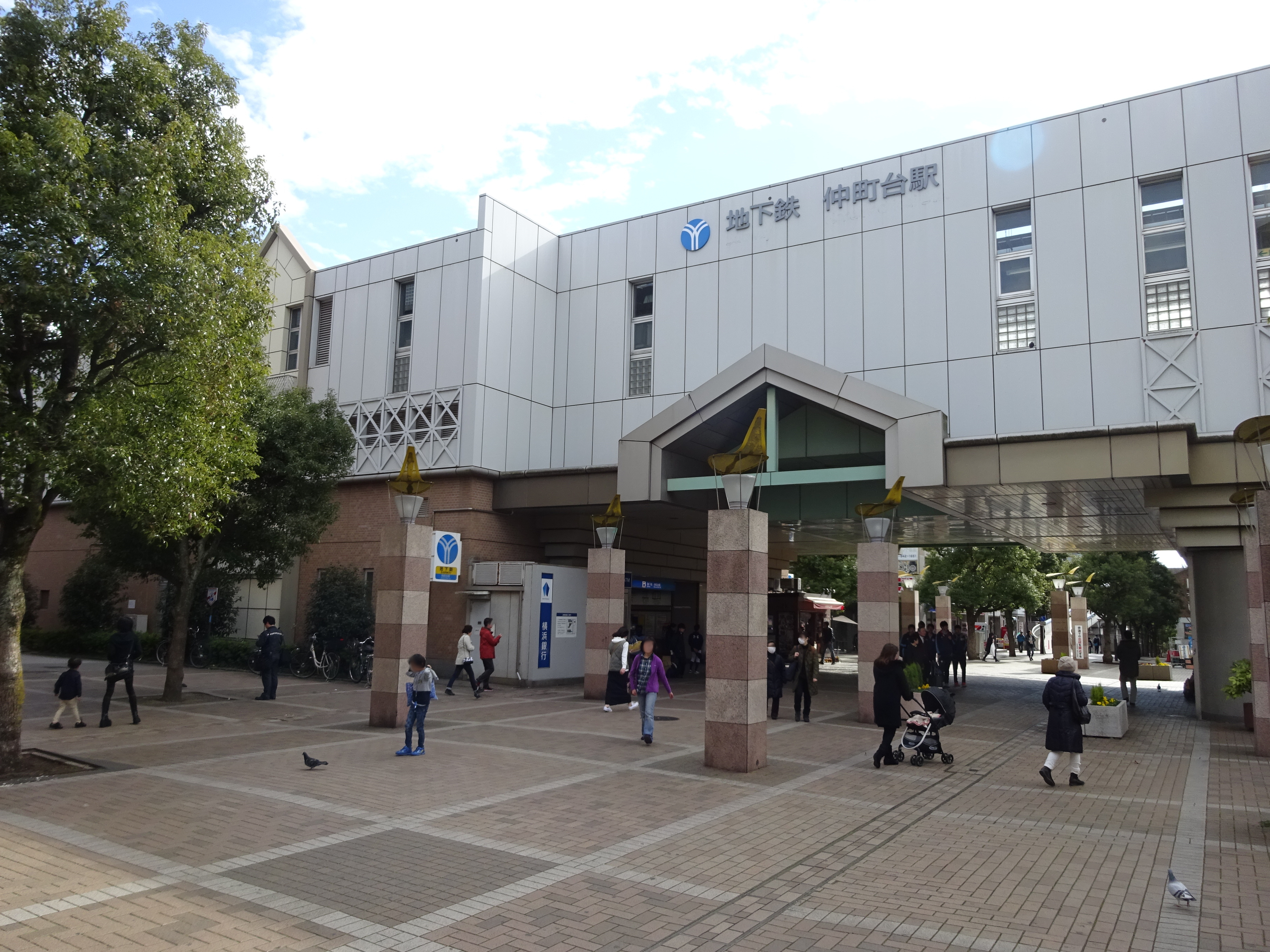
- Nakmachidai Station building

General information
- Location: 1-1-1 Nakamachidai, Tsuzuki, Yokohama, Kanagawa （横浜市都筑区仲町台一丁目1-1） Japan
- System: Yokohama Municipal Subway station
- Operator: Yokohama City Transportation Bureau
- Line: Blue Line
- Platforms: 2 side platforms
- Tracks: 2

Other information
- Station code: B28

History
- Opened: 18 March 1993; 33 years ago

Passengers
- FY2008: 14,321 daily

Services
Preceding station	Yokohama Municipal Subway	Following station
Nippa B27 towards Shonandai	Blue Line Rapid Local	Center-Minami B29 towards Azamino
Location
- Location within Yokohama Location within Kanagawa Prefecture Location within Japan

Nakamachidai Station (仲町台駅, Nakamachidai-eki) is a railway station on the Yokohama Subway Blue Line in Tsuzuki-ku, Yokohama, Kanagawa Prefecture, Japan, operated by Yokohama Municipal Subway.

== Lines ==
Nakamachidai Station is served by the Blue Line, and is 34.1 kilometres (21.2 mi) from the terminus of the Blue Line at Shōnandai Station.

== Station layout ==
Nakamachidai Station has two opposed side platforms serving two tracks. The ground-level station building is located underneath the tracks and platforms.

=== Platforms ===
1	■ Blue Line	for Shin-Yokohama, Yokohama, Kannai, Totsuka, and Shōnandai
2	■ Blue Line	for Azamino

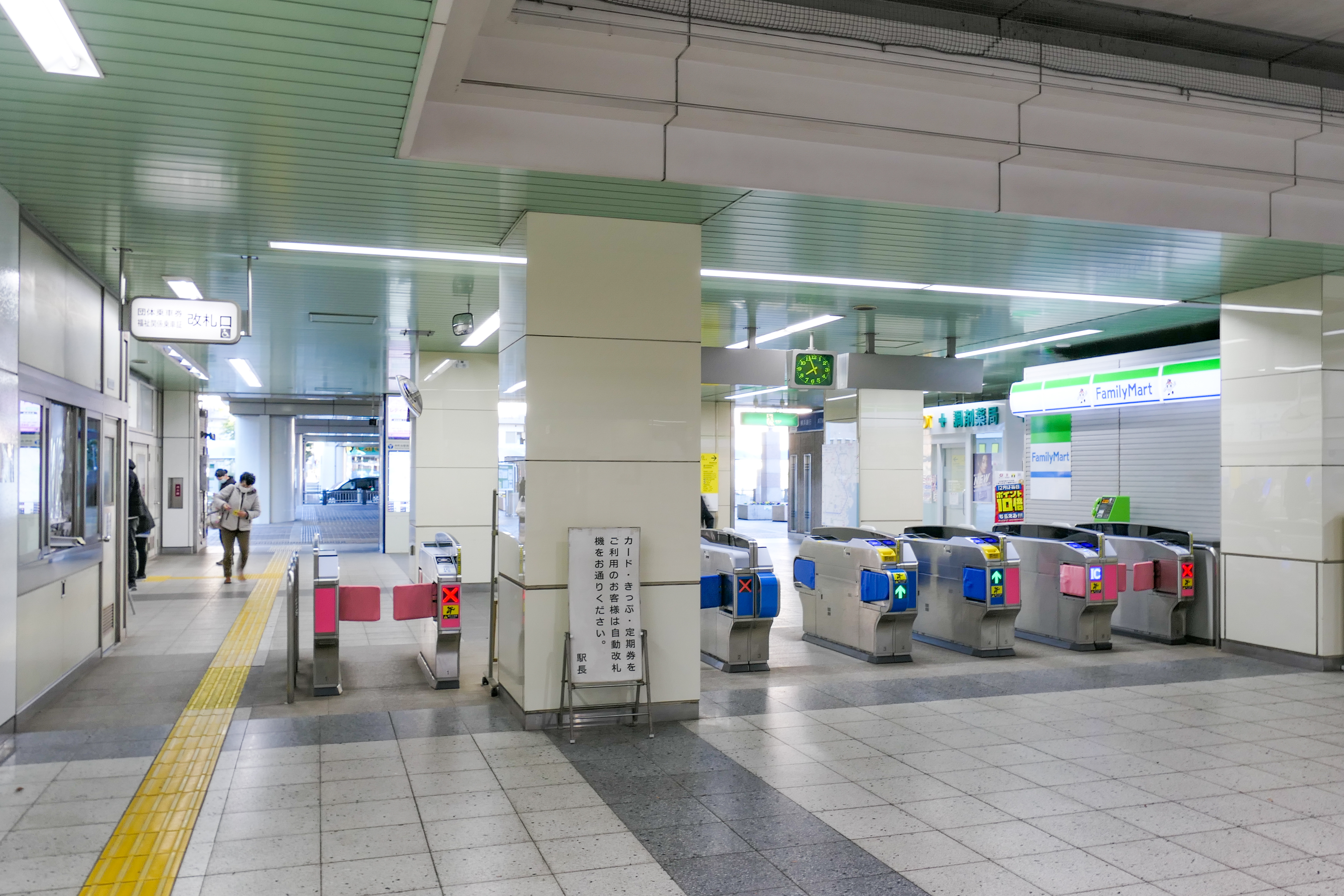
Ticket gates

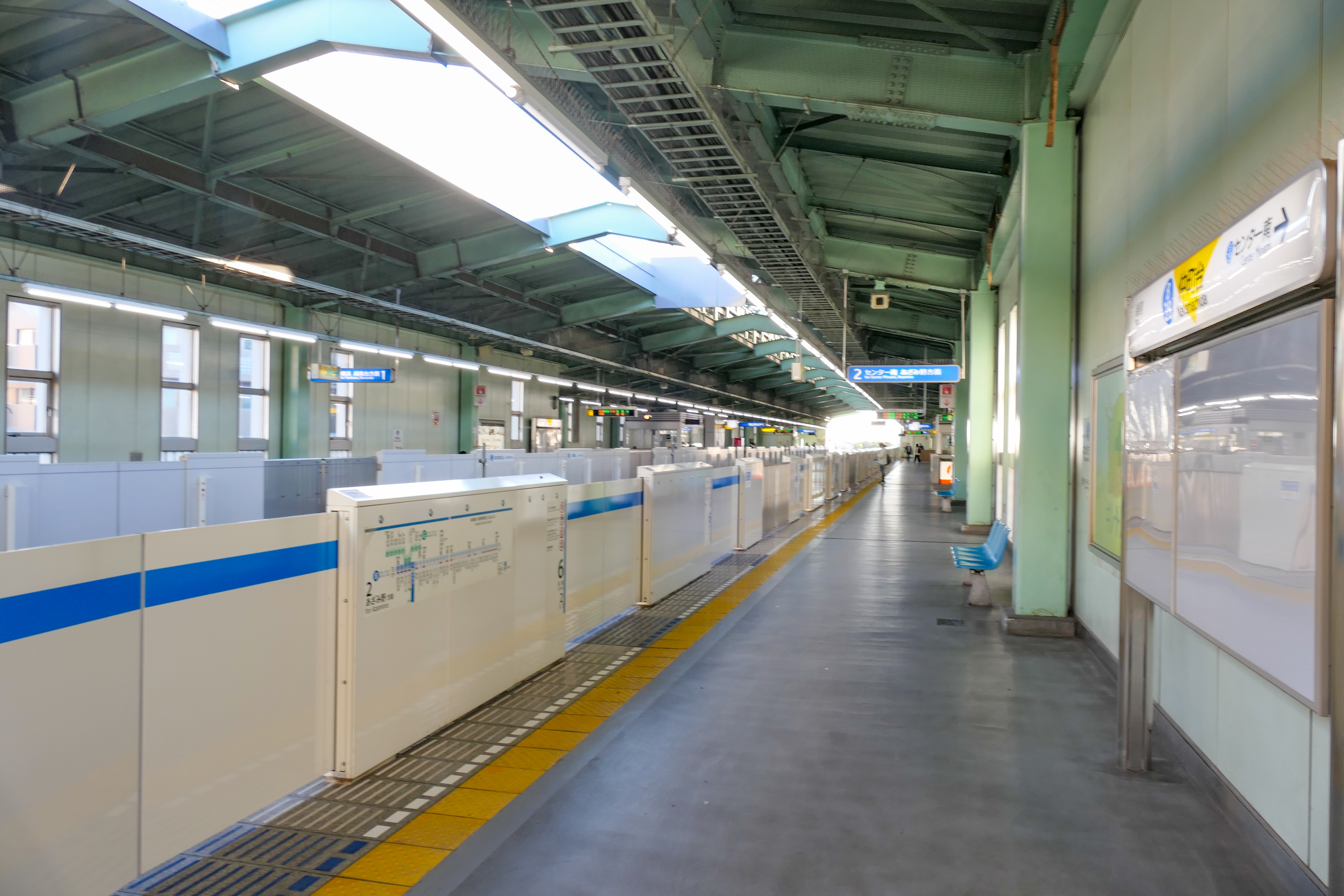
Platform

== History ==
Nakamachidai Station was opened on 18 March 1993. Platform edge doors were installed in April 2007.
