= Kita-Yono Station =

Railway station in Saitama, Japan

JA25 Kita-Yono Station 北与野駅
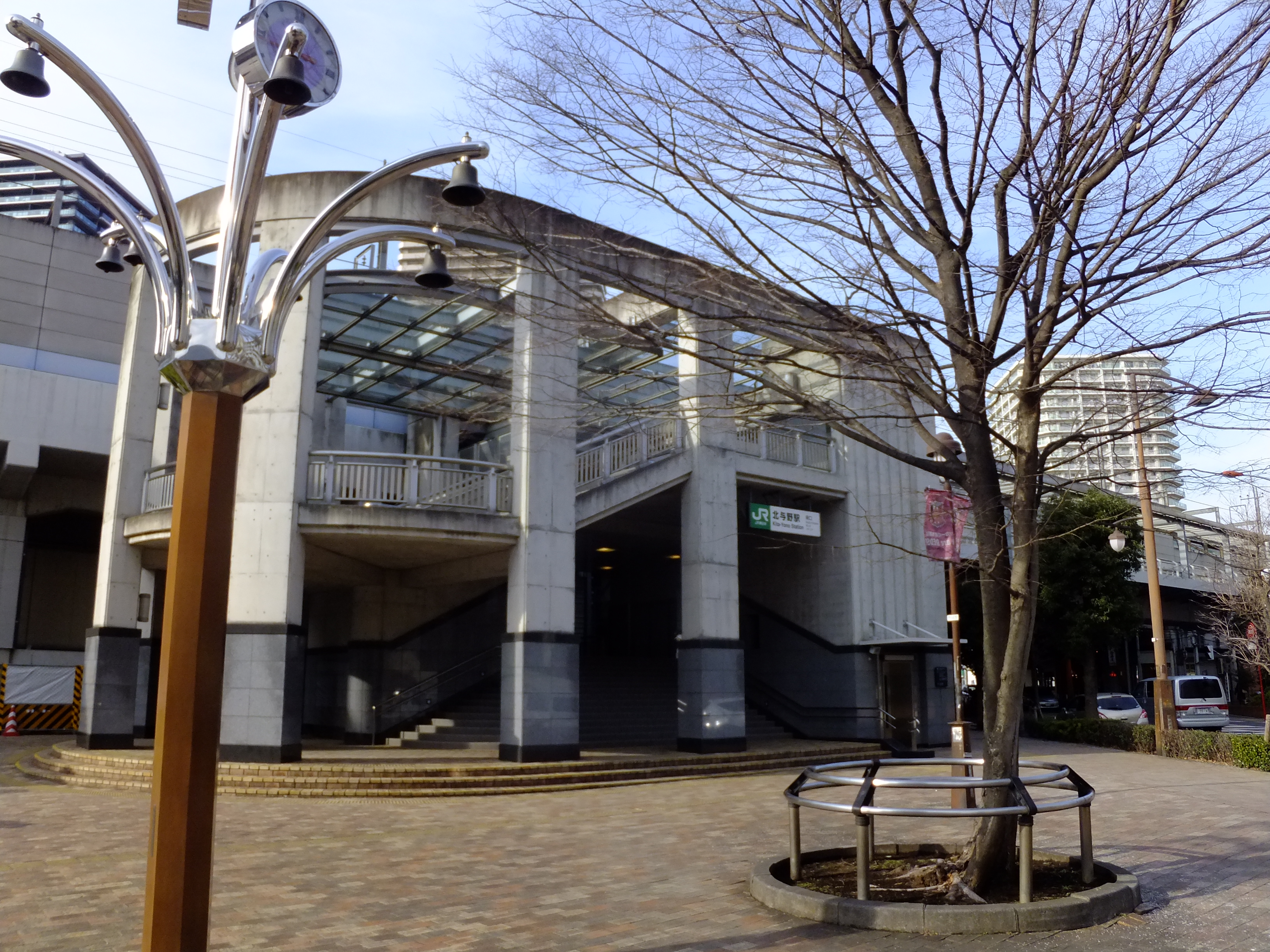
- South side of Kita-Yono Station

General information
- Location: 2-3-1 Kami-Ochiai, Chūō-ku, Saitama-shi, Saitama-ken 338–0001; Japan
- Coordinates: 35°53′26.93″N 139°37′43.16″E
- Operator: JR East
- Line: ■Saikyō Line
- Distance: 21.7 km from Ikebukuro
- Platforms: 1 island platform
- Connections: Bus stop

Other information
- Status: Staffed
- Station code: JA25
- Website: Official website

History
- Opened: 30 September 1985

Passengers
- FY2019: 10,489 daily

Services
Preceding station	JR East	Following station
Yonohommachi JA24 towards Ōsaki	Saikyō Line Rapid Local	Ōmiya Terminus
Location
- Location within Saitama Prefecture Location within Japan

Kita-Yono Station (北与野駅, Kita-Yono-eki) is a passenger railway station on the Saikyō Line located in Chūō-ku, Saitama, Saitama Prefecture, Japan, operated by the East Japan Railway Company (JR East).

== Lines ==
Kita-Yono Station is served by the Saikyō Line which runs between Ōsaki in Tokyo and Ōmiya in Saitama Prefecture. Some trains continue northward to Kawagoe via the Kawagoe Line and southward to Shin-Kiba via the TWR Rinkai Line. Kita-Yono Station is located 21.7 km from Ikebukuro Station. The station identification colour is blue.

== Station layout ==
The station consists of one elevated island platform serving two tracks, with the station building located underneath. The tracks of the Tōhoku Shinkansen also run adjacent to this station, on the west side. The station is staffed.

=== Platforms ===
1	Saikyō Line	for Musashi-Urawa, Akabane, Shinjuku and Ōsaki; Rinkai Line for Shin-Kiba
2	Saikyō Line	for Ōmiya and Kawagoe

== History ==
The station opened on 30 September 1985.

== Passenger statistics ==
In fiscal 2019, the station was used by an average of 10,489 passengers daily (boarding passengers only). The passenger figures for previous years are as shown below.

Fiscal year	Daily average
2000	7,380
2005	7,474
2010	8,071
2015	9,088

== Surrounding area ==
- Saitama Super Arena (about a 7-minute walk via an elevated walkway)
- Saitama New Urban Center

== See also ==
- List of railway stations in Japan
