= Ukima-Funado Station =

Railway station in Tokyo, Japan

Coordinates: 35°47′28.27″N 139°41′28.80″E

JA17 Ukimafunado Station 浮間舟渡駅
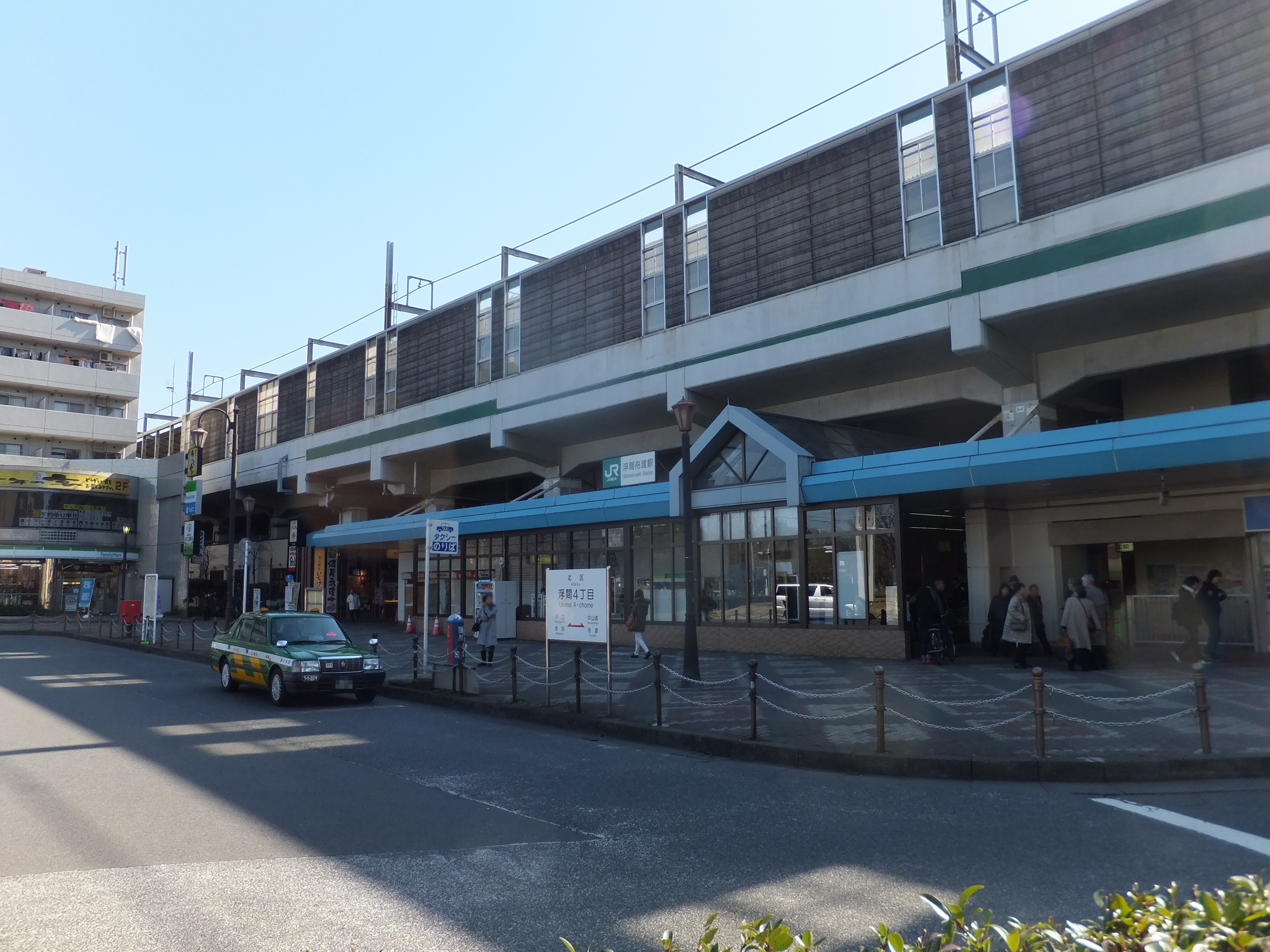
- Ukimafunado Station, February 2016

General information
- Location: 4 Ukima, Kita, Tokyo （東京都北区浮間4丁目） Japan
- Operator: JR East
- Line: Saikyō Line
- Connections: Bus stop

History
- Opened: 30 September 1985

Passengers
- FY2011: 19,463 daily

Services
Preceding station	JR East	Following station
Kita-Akabane JA16 towards Ōsaki	Saikyō Line Local	Toda-Kōen JA18 towards Ōmiya
Location

Ukimafunado Station (浮間舟渡駅, Ukimafunado-eki) is a railway station on the Saikyō Line in Kita, Tokyo, Japan, operated by the East Japan Railway Company (JR East).

== Lines ==
Ukimafunado Station is served by the Saikyō Line which runs between Ōsaki in Tokyo and Ōmiya in Saitama Prefecture. Some trains continue northward to Kawagoe via the Kawagoe Line and southward to Shin-Kiba via the TWR Rinkai Line. The station is located 8.6 km north of Ikebukuro Station. The station identification colour is "tokiwa green".

The station name is taken from the Ukima and Funado districts in which the station lies.

Under the JR fare calculation system, this station is the northern boundary station of the "Tokyo 23 Districts" area.

== Station layout ==
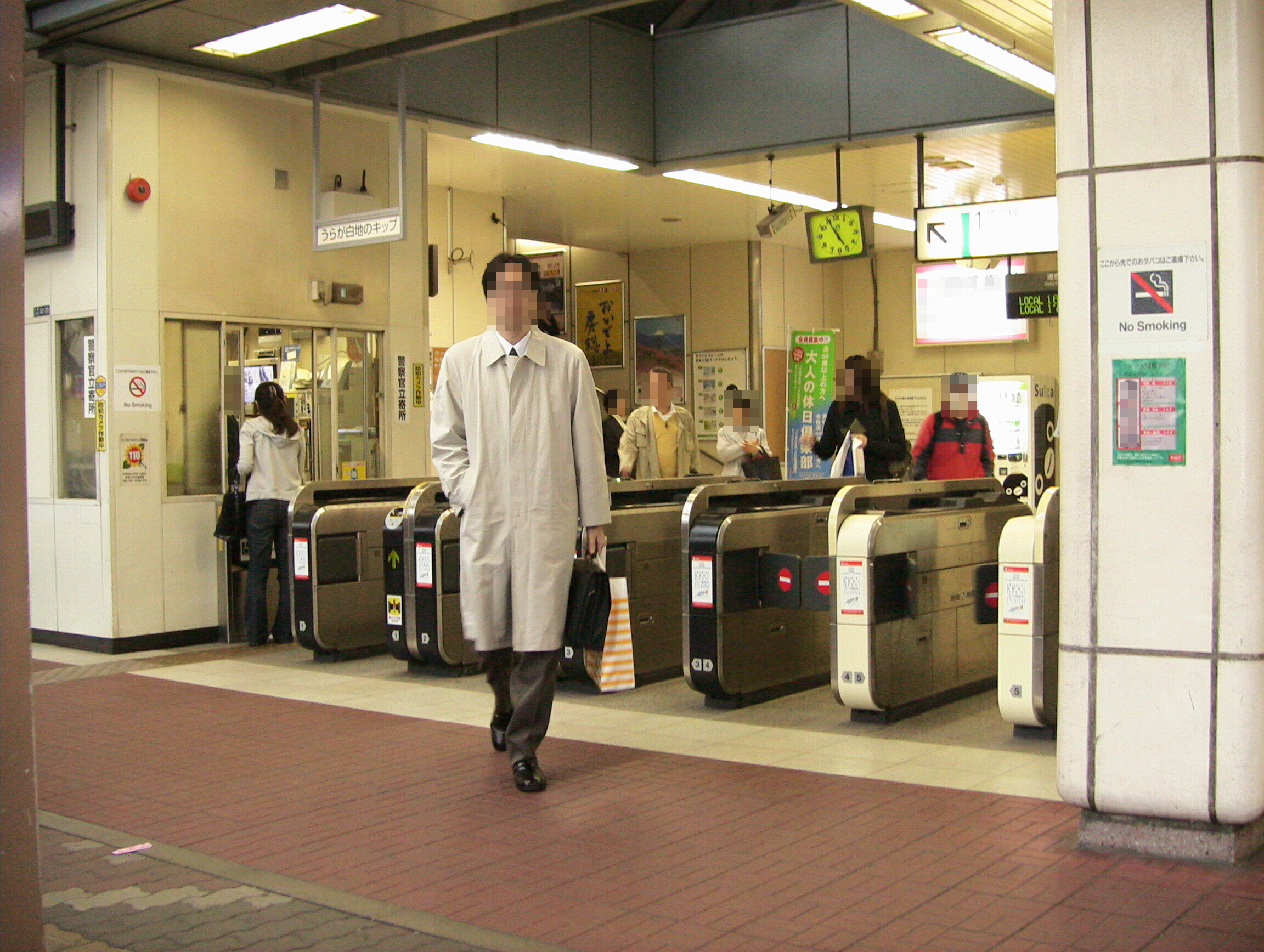
Ticket barriers at the station, March 2007

The station consists of one elevated island platform serving two tracks. The tracks of the Tōhoku Shinkansen also run adjacent to this station, on the west side.

=== Platforms ===
1	Saikyō Line	for Akabane, Shinjuku, and Ōsaki; Rinkai Line for Shin-Kiba
2	Saikyō Line	for Musashi-Urawa, Ōmiya, and Kawagoe

== History ==
Ukimafunado Station opened on 30 September 1985.

== Passenger statistics ==
In fiscal 2011, the station was used by an average of 19,463 passengers daily (boarding passengers only).

The passenger figures for previous years are as shown below.

Fiscal year	Daily average
2000	16,488
2005	18,420
2010	19,546
2011	19,463

== Surrounding area ==
- Arakawa River
- Ukima Park
- National Route 17

=== Schools ===
- Shibaura Institute of Technology Junior and Senior High School
- Kita Ward Ukima Junior High School
- Kita Ward Ukima Elementary School
- Itabashi Ward Shimura No. 5 Junior High School
- Itabashi Ward Funado Elementary School

== See also ==
- List of railway stations in Japan
