= Saikyō Line =

Railway line in Japan

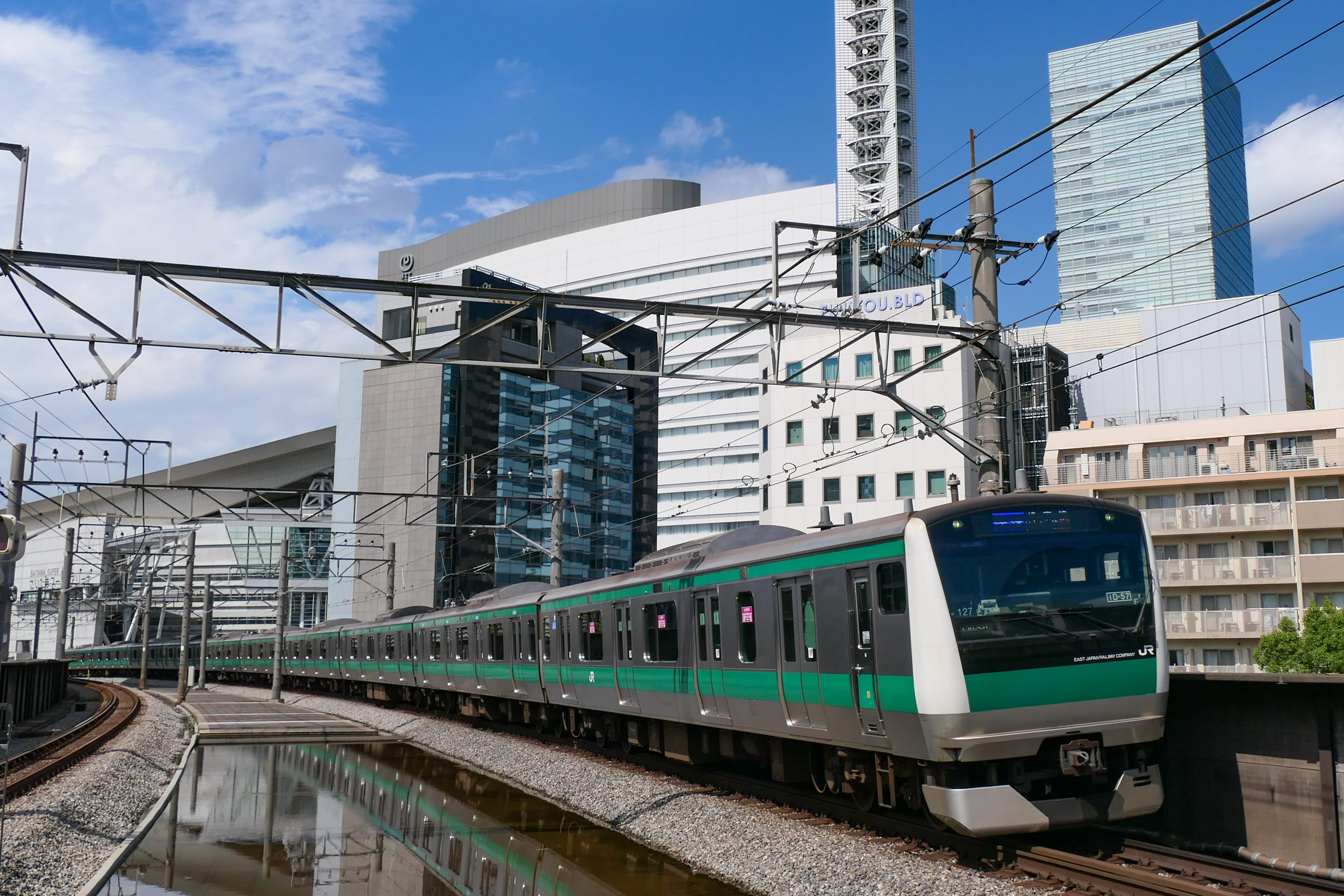
- Saikyō Line E233 series EMU set 127 approaching Kita-Yono Station in June 2021

Overview
- Native name: 埼京線
- Status: In operation
- Owner: JR East
- Line number: JA
- Locale: Tokyo, Saitama prefectures
- Termini: Ōsaki; Ōmiya
- Stations: 19
- Color on map: Sea green

Service
- Type: Commuter rail
- Operator: JR East
- Depot: Kawagoe (Minami-Furuya)
- Rolling stock: E233-7000; TWR 70-000; TWR 71-000; Sotetsu 12000
- Daily ridership: 1,105,557 (daily 2015)

History
- Opened: 30 September 1985; 41 years ago (Akabane–Ōmiya section)

Technical
- Line length: 36.9 km (22.9 mi)
- Num of tracks: 2
- Track gauge: 1,067 mm (3 ft 6 in)
- Electrification: Overhead line, 1,500 V DC
- Operating speed: 100 km/h (62 mph)
- Signalling: Osaki–Ikebukuro: Automatic block; Ikebukuro–Ōmiya: Moving block
- Train protection system: Osaki–Ikebukuro: ATS-P; Ikebukuro–Ōmiya: ATACS
Route map

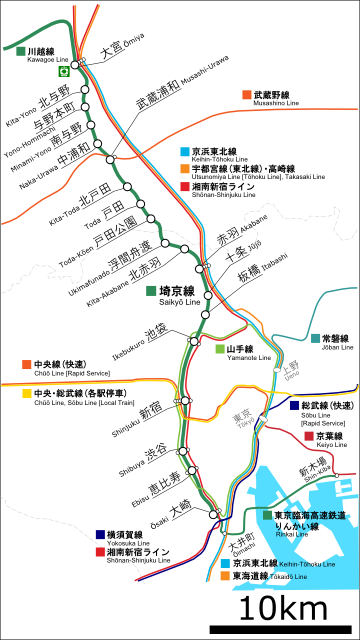

The Saikyō Line (Japanese: 埼京線, romanized: Saikyō-sen) is a 36.9-kilometre (22.9 mi) Japanese railway line operated by the East Japan Railway Company (JR East). It connects Ōsaki Station in Shinagawa, Tokyo, and Ōmiya Station in Saitama Prefecture. The line's name is a portmanteau of the names of the two areas it connects, using the first syllable of Saitama and the last syllable of Tōkyō.

At the northern end of the line, some trains continue beyond Ōmiya to Kawagoe on the Kawagoe Line. At the southern end, many Saikyō Line trains continue beyond Ōsaki to Shin-Kiba on the Rinkai Line, operated by Tokyo Waterfront Area Rapid Transit (TWR), or to Ebina on the Sotetsu Main Line, via the Sōtetsu Shin-Yokohama Line.

== Route ==
From south to north, the Saikyō Line runs on the Yamanote Freight Line, parallel to the Yamanote Line, between Ōsaki and Ikebukuro. Between Ikebukuro and Akabane, it runs on the Akabane Line (赤羽線). Between Akabane and Ōmiya, trains use a line purpose-built for the Saikyō Line, which is classified as a branch of the Tōhoku Main Line and runs parallel to it.

The line's maximum speed is 95 km/h (59 mph) between Ōsaki and Itabashi, 90 km/h (56 mph) between Itabashi and Akabane, and 100 km/h (62 mph) between Akabane and Ōmiya.

== Service ==
There are three types of trains on the Saikyō Line: "Local" (各駅停車, Kakueki-Teisha), "Rapid" (快速, kaisoku), and "Commuter Rapid" (通勤快速, tsūkin kaisoku). Between Akabane and Musashi-Urawa, Rapid trains stop only at Toda-Kōen, while Commuter Rapid trains, which run during rush hours, stop only at Musashi-Urawa between Akabane and Ōmiya. Between Akabane and Ikebukuro, as well as on the Kawagoe and Rinkai lines, all trains stop at all stations. Between Ikebukuro and Osaki on the Yamanote Freight Line, all trains run limited-stop in both directions, with the Yamanote Line providing all-stations service. Some local trains also terminate at Shinjuku.

== Station list ==
- Local trains stop at all stations.
- Rapid and commuter rapid trains stop at stations marked "●" and pass those marked "|".

Line	No.	Station	Distance in km (mi)		Rapid	Commuter rapid	Transfers	Location	
Line	No.	Station	Between stations	Total	Rapid	Commuter rapid	Transfers	Location	
↑ Through-running to/from ↑ Shin-Kiba via Rinkai Line or Ebina via Shōnan–Shinjuku, Sōtetsu–JR Link and Sotetsu Main lines
Yamanote		Ōsaki 大崎	—N/a	0 (0)	●	●	Shōnan–Shinjuku Line (JS17; through service); Yamanote Line (JY24); Rinkai Line (R-08; through service)	Shinagawa	Tokyo
Yamanote		Ebisu 恵比寿	3.6 (2.2)		●	●	Shōnan–Shinjuku Line (JS18); Yamanote Line (JY21); Hibiya Line (H-02)	Shibuya	Tokyo
Yamanote		Shibuya 渋谷	1.6 (0.99)	5.2 (3.2)	●	●	Shōnan–Shinjuku Line (JS19); Yamanote Line (JY20); Tōyoko Line (TY01); Den-en-toshi Line (DT01); Inokashira Line (IN01); Ginza Line (G-01); Hanzōmon Line (Z-01); Fukutoshin Line (F-16)	Shibuya	Tokyo
Yamanote		Shinjuku 新宿	3.4 (2.1)	8.6 (5.3)	●	●	Chūō Line (JC05); Chūō–Sōbu Line (JB10); Yamanote Line (JY17); Shōnan–Shinjuku Line (JS20); Keiō Line/Keiō New Line (KO01); Odawara Line (OH01); Shinjuku Line (Seibu-Shinjuku: SS01); Marunouchi Line (M-08); Shinjuku Line (S-01); Ōedo Line (E-27, Shinjuku-Nishiguchi: E-01)	Shibuya	Tokyo
Yamanote		Shinjuku 新宿	3.4 (2.1)	8.6 (5.3)	●	●	Chūō Line (JC05); Chūō–Sōbu Line (JB10); Yamanote Line (JY17); Shōnan–Shinjuku Line (JS20); Keiō Line/Keiō New Line (KO01); Odawara Line (OH01); Shinjuku Line (Seibu-Shinjuku: SS01); Marunouchi Line (M-08); Shinjuku Line (S-01); Ōedo Line (E-27, Shinjuku-Nishiguchi: E-01)	Shinjuku	Tokyo
Yamanote		Ikebukuro 池袋	4.8 (3.0)	13.4 (8.3)	●	●	Shōnan–Shinjuku Line (JS21); Yamanote Line (JY13); Ikebukuro Line (SI01); Tojo Line (TJ01); Marunouchi Line (M-25); Yūrakuchō Line (Y-09); Fukutoshin Line (F-09)	Toshima	Tokyo
Akabane		Ikebukuro 池袋	4.8 (3.0)	13.4 (8.3)	●	●	Shōnan–Shinjuku Line (JS21); Yamanote Line (JY13); Ikebukuro Line (SI01); Tojo Line (TJ01); Marunouchi Line (M-25); Yūrakuchō Line (Y-09); Fukutoshin Line (F-09)	Toshima	Tokyo
Akabane	JA13	Itabashi 板橋	1.8 (1.1)	15.2 (9.4)	●	●	Mita Line (Shin-Itabashi: I-17); Tojo Line (Shimo-Itabashi: TJ03)	Kita, Itabashi, Toshima	Tokyo
Akabane	JA14	Jūjō 十条	1.7 (1.1)	16.9 (10.5)	●	●		Kita	Tokyo
Akabane		Akabane 赤羽	2.0 (1.2)	18.9 (11.7)	●	●	Keihin–Tōhoku Line (JK38); Utsunomiya Line/Takasaki Line (JU04); Shōnan–Shinjuku Line (JS22)	Kita	Tokyo
Tohoku (branch)		Akabane 赤羽	2.0 (1.2)	18.9 (11.7)	●	●	Keihin–Tōhoku Line (JK38); Utsunomiya Line/Takasaki Line (JU04); Shōnan–Shinjuku Line (JS22)	Kita	Tokyo
Tohoku (branch)	JA16	Kita-Akabane 北赤羽	1.5 (0.93)	20.4 (12.7)	|	|		Kita	Tokyo
Tohoku (branch)	JA17	Ukima-Funado 浮間舟渡	1.6 (0.99)	22.0 (13.7)	|	|		Kita	Tokyo
Tohoku (branch)	JA18	Toda-Kōen 戸田公園	2.4 (1.5)	24.4 (15.2)	●	|		Toda	Saitama
Tohoku (branch)	JA19	Toda 戸田	1.3 (0.81)	25.7 (16.0)	|	|		Toda	Saitama
Tohoku (branch)	JA20	Kita-Toda 北戸田	1.4 (0.87)	27.1 (16.8)	|	|		Toda	Saitama
Tohoku (branch)	JA21	Musashi-Urawa 武蔵浦和	2.4 (1.5)	29.5 (18.3)	●	●	Musashino Line (JM26)	Minami-ku, Saitama	Saitama
Tohoku (branch)	JA22	Naka-Urawa 中浦和	1.2 (0.75)	30.7 (19.1)	●	|		Minami-ku, Saitama	Saitama
Tohoku (branch)	JA23	Minami-Yono 南与野	1.7 (1.1)	32.4 (20.1)	●	|		Chūō-ku, Saitama	Saitama
Tohoku (branch)	JA24	Yonohommachi 与野本町	1.6 (0.99)	34.0 (21.1)	●	|		Chūō-ku, Saitama	Saitama
Tohoku (branch)	JA25	Kita-Yono 北与野	1.1 (0.68)	35.1 (21.8)	●	|		Chūō-ku, Saitama	Saitama
Tohoku (branch)		Ōmiya 大宮	1.8 (1.1)	36.9 (22.9)	●	●	■ Kawagoe Line (some through services); Tōhoku Shinkansen (Hokkaido, Akita, Yamagata); Jōetsu Shinkansen; Hokuriku Shinkansen; Keihin–Tōhoku Line (JK47); Utsunomiya Line/Takasaki Line (JU07); Shōnan–Shinjuku Line (JS24); Tōbu Urban Park Line (TD01); New Shuttle (NS01)	Ōmiya-ku, Saitama	Saitama
↓ Through-running to/from Kawagoe via Kawagoe Line ↓

== Rolling stock ==
=== Current ===
- JR East E233-7000 series 10-car EMUs (since 30 June 2013)
- TWR 70-000 series 10-car EMUs (since 1 December 2002)
- TWR 71-000 series 10-car EMUs (since 1 October 2025)
- Sotetsu 12000 series 10-car EMUs (since 30 November 2019)

Services on the Saikyō Line, includuing through service on the Kawagoe, Rinkai, and Sōtetsu Main lines are operated by JR East's fleet of 38 10-car E233-7000 series EMU trains, based at Kawagoe Depot; TWR's fleet of eight 10-car 70-000 series EMU trains, currently being replaced by eight 10-car 71-000 series EMU trains, based at Yashio Depot; and Sagami Railway's fleet of six 10-car Sotetsu 12000 series EMU trains, based at the Kashiwadai Vehicle Center.

JR East E233-7000 series EMU

TWR 70-000 series EMU

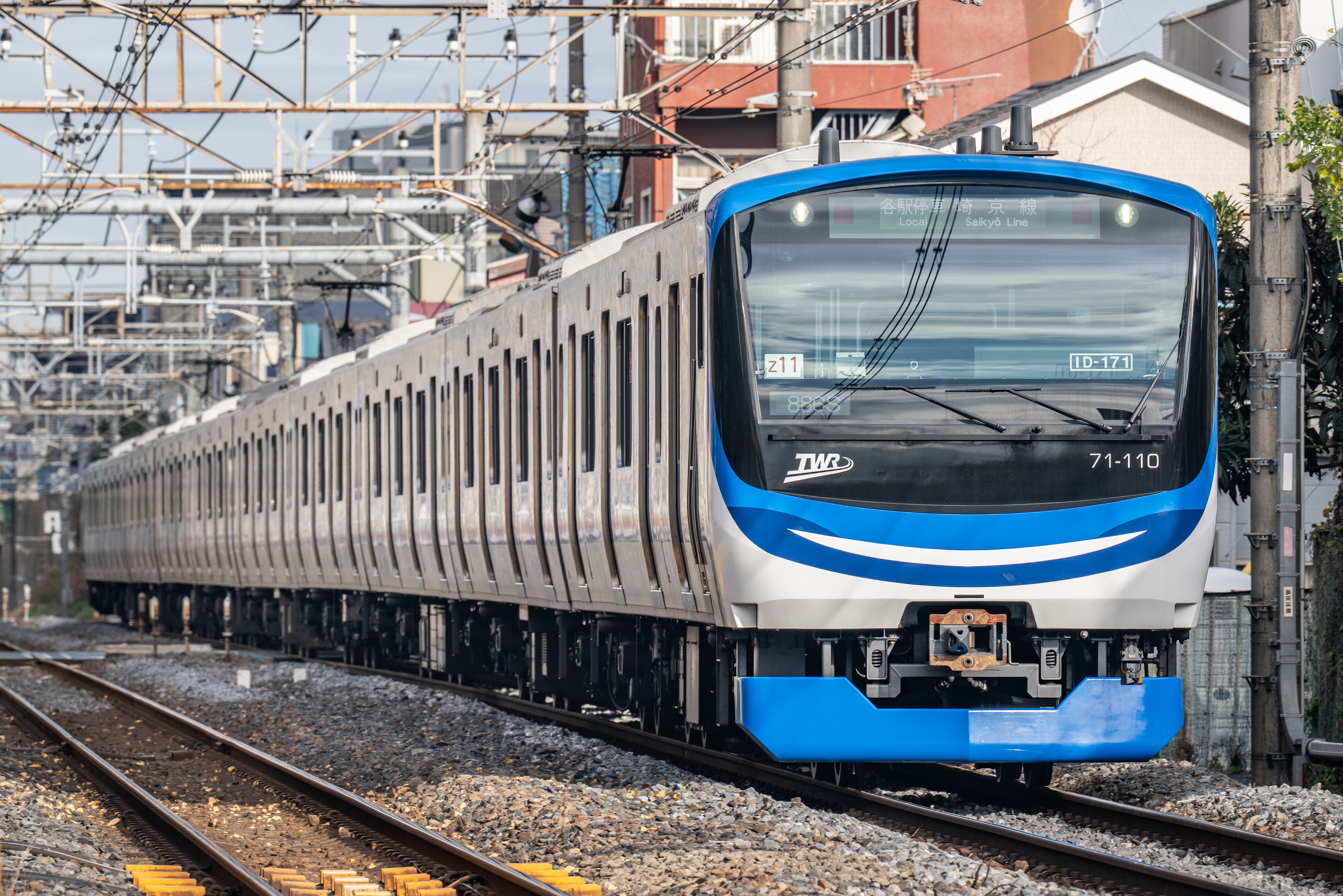
TWR 71-000 series EMU

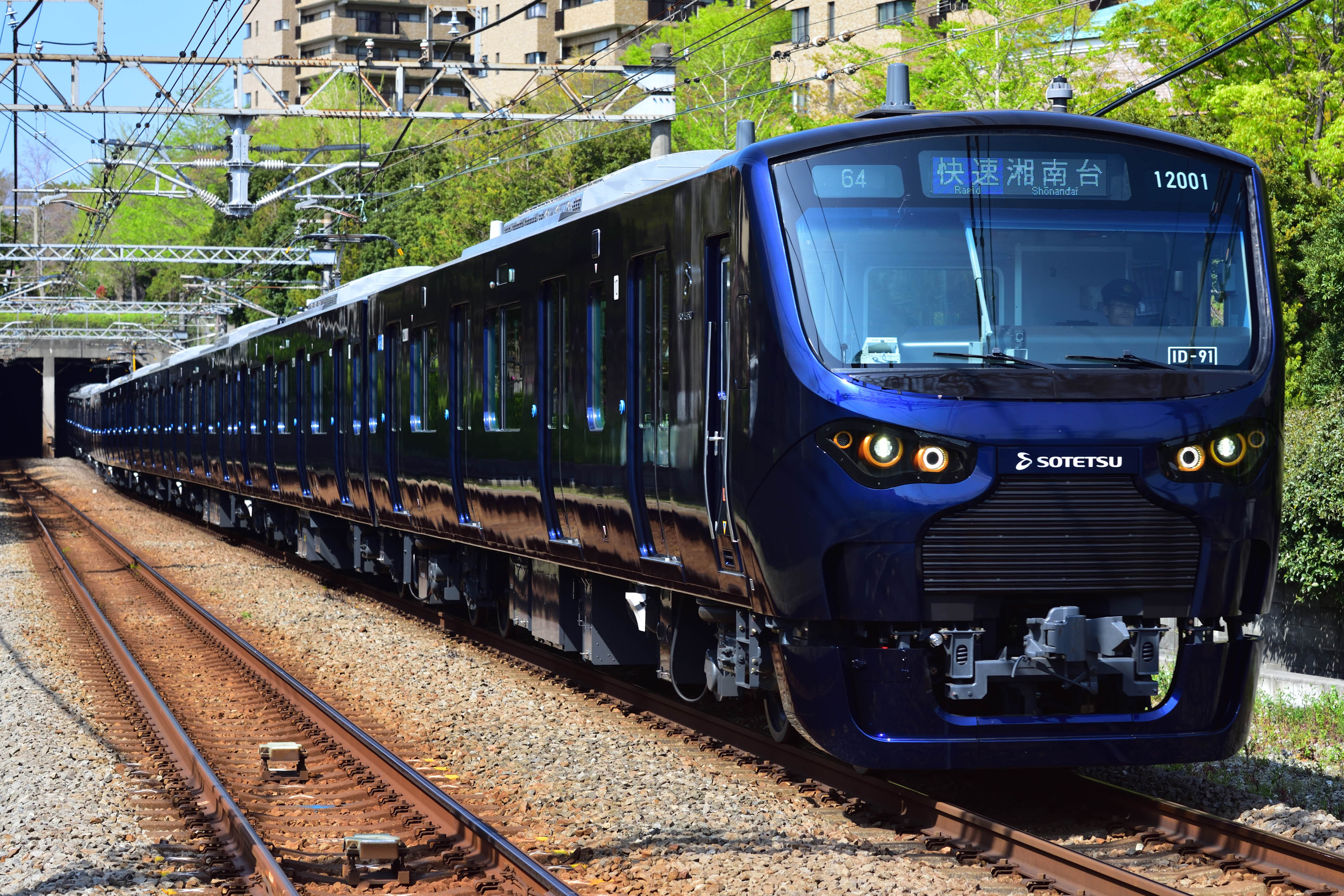
Sotetsu 12000 series EMU

=== Former ===
- JR East 205 series 10-car EMUs (July 1989 – October 2016)

Before the establishment of the Saikyō Line, rolling stock used on the Akabane Line included:

- 72 series 8-car EMUs (1953–1967)
- 101 series 8-car EMUs (1967–1978)
- 103 series 8/10-car EMUs (1978–1985)
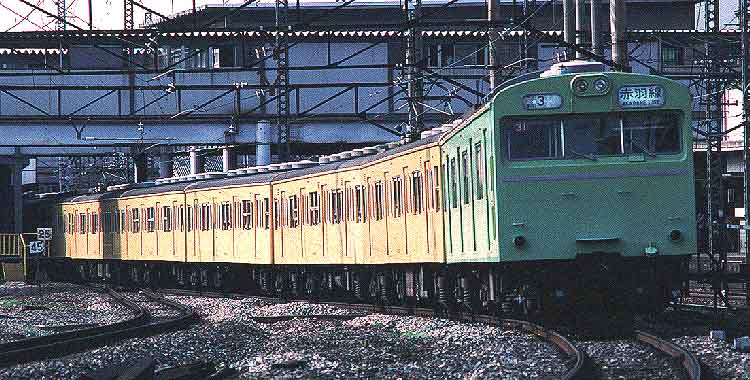
JR East Akabane Line 103 series train in 1979

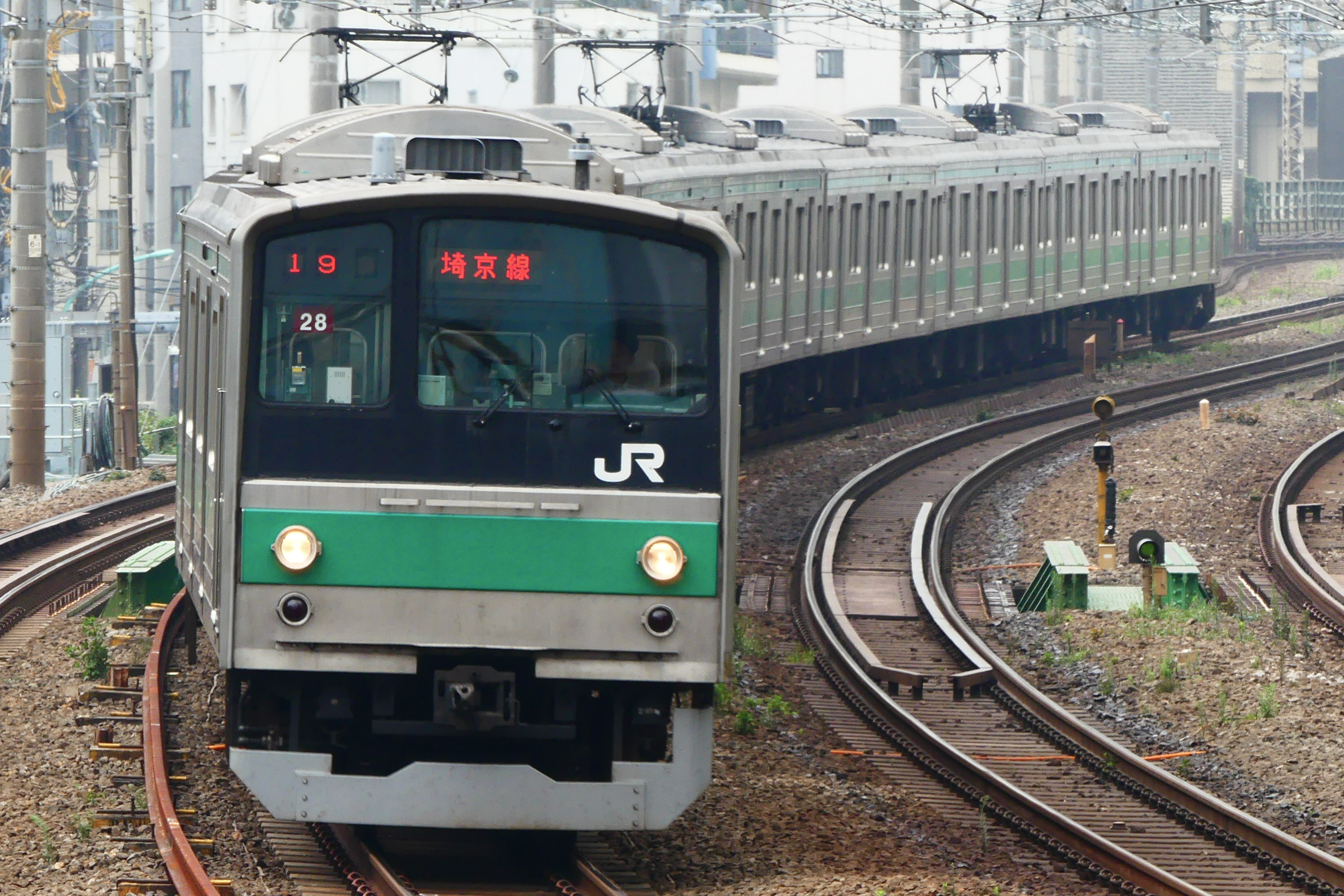
JR East 205 series EMU on the Saikyō Line

== History ==
The Akabane Line opened on 1 March 1885, as part of Nippon Railway's Shinagawa Line. Nippon Railway was nationalized in 1906, and electric services began in 1909. From 1972 to 1985, the Akabane Line was operated as a branch of the Yamanote Line.

Before the Saikyō Line was built, several proposals sought to improve commuter rail service between Saitama and Tokyo. The Tokyo-Ōmiya Electric Railway (東京大宮電気鉄道, Tōkyō-Ōmiya Denki Tetsudō) was established in 1928 but went bankrupt soon afterward. In 1968, the Tokyo Metropolitan Bureau of Transportation proposed extending the Toei Mita Line to central Ōmiya.

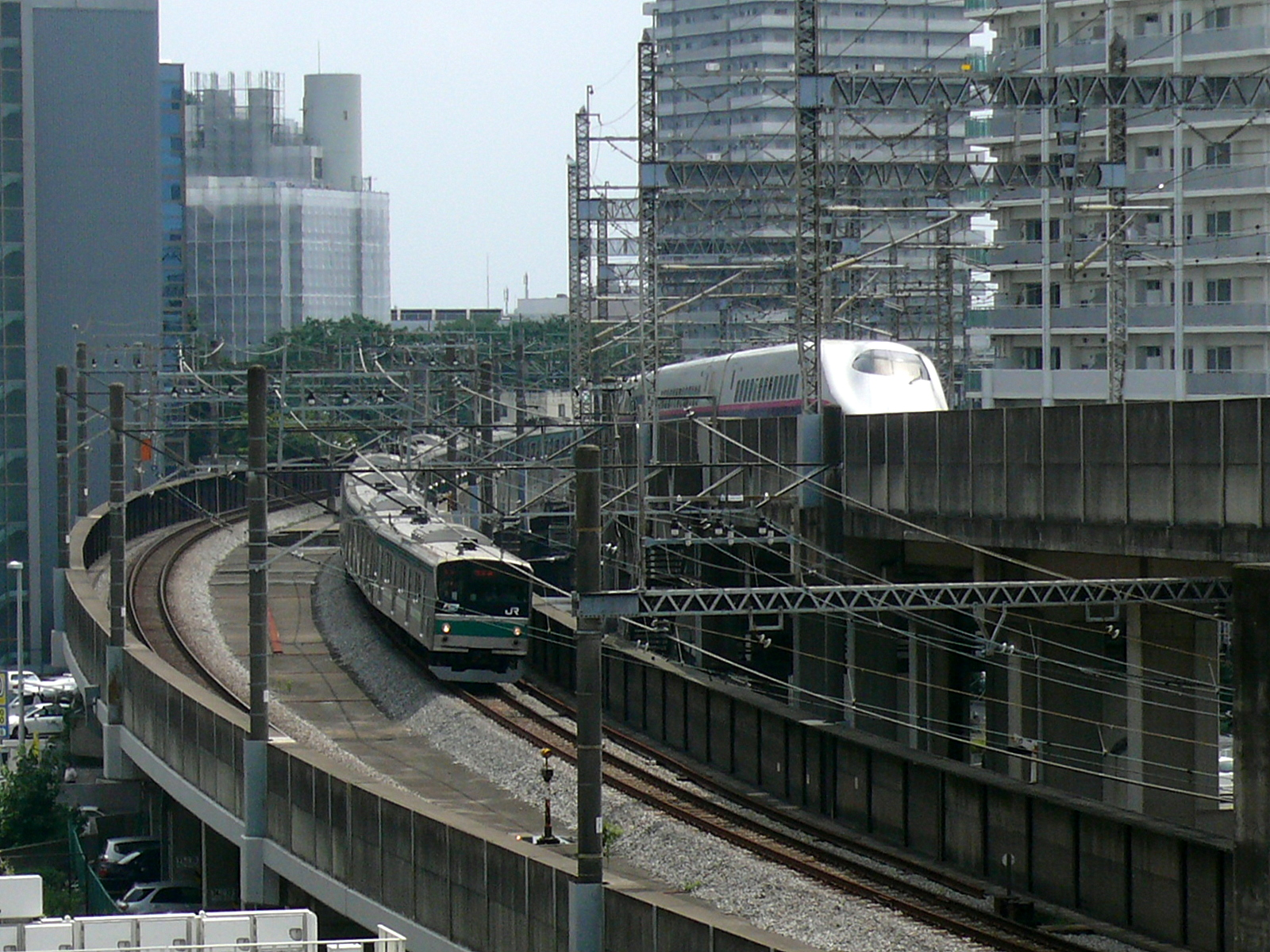
Saikyo Line and Tohoku Shinkansen

Development of the Saikyō Line began as part of an agreement between Japanese National Railways (JNR) and local residents opposed to construction of the Tōhoku Shinkansen and Jōetsu Shinkansen through Saitama Prefecture. During the 1970s, residents and activists protested the Shinkansen construction through sit-ins and other forms of opposition. JNR agreed to construct a new commuter railway between Ōmiya and Akabane as part of a settlement that allowed construction of the Shinkansen lines to proceed.

The new railway was known as the "New Commuter Line" (通勤新線, Tsūkin Shinsen) during construction. The stations between Kita-Akabane and Kita-Yono were temporarily designated by numbers from one to ten, with Kita-Akabane known as "New Commuter Line Station No. 1". Because the stations had largely identical designs, JNR gave each a distinct accent color to help passengers distinguish them.

The newly built line between Ōmiya and Akabane opened on 30 September 1985. Services continued through to Ikebukuro over the existing Akabane Line, and the Saikyō Line name was adopted for the combined service. The Akabane Line designation subsequently fell out of use for passenger services.

On 3 March 1986, Saikyō Line services began operating through to Shinjuku over the Yamanote Freight Line, which had seen less freight traffic following the opening of the Musashino Line in 1973. Freight traffic on the Akabane Line continued until 1999.

Services were extended south to Shibuya and Ebisu on 16 March 1996, following the construction of new passenger platforms on the Yamanote Freight Line at those stations.

Services were extended south to Ōsaki, with through services onto the Rinkai Line, on 1 December 2002.

The Saikyō Line experienced severe overcrowding during peak periods, particularly on weekday mornings. The opening of the Shōnan–Shinjuku Line in 2004 and Tokyo Metro's Fukutoshin Line in 2008 provided additional parallel service on parts of the route. Overcrowding was also associated with longer station dwell times and delays, and was blamed, in part, for the line having the highest number of reported groping incidents (known as chikan) in the Greater Tokyo area. JR East introduced women-only passenger cars on Saikyō Line trains during designated periods in response to these incidents.

On 20 August 2016, station numbering was introduced on the line, with stations assigned numbers JA08 through JA26. The numbers increase in the northbound direction toward Ōmiya.

On 30 November 2019, some Saikyō Line services began operating through to Ebina via the Sōtetsu–JR Link Line. From Ōsaki, trains travel onto the Hinkaku Line and Tōkaidō Freight Line before joining the Sōtetsu–JR Link Line near Hazawa Yokohama-Kokudai Station.
