= Kita-Akabane Station =

Railway station in Tokyo, Japan

Coordinates: 35°47′12.1092″N 139°42′22.29″E

JA16 Kita-Akabane Station 北赤羽駅
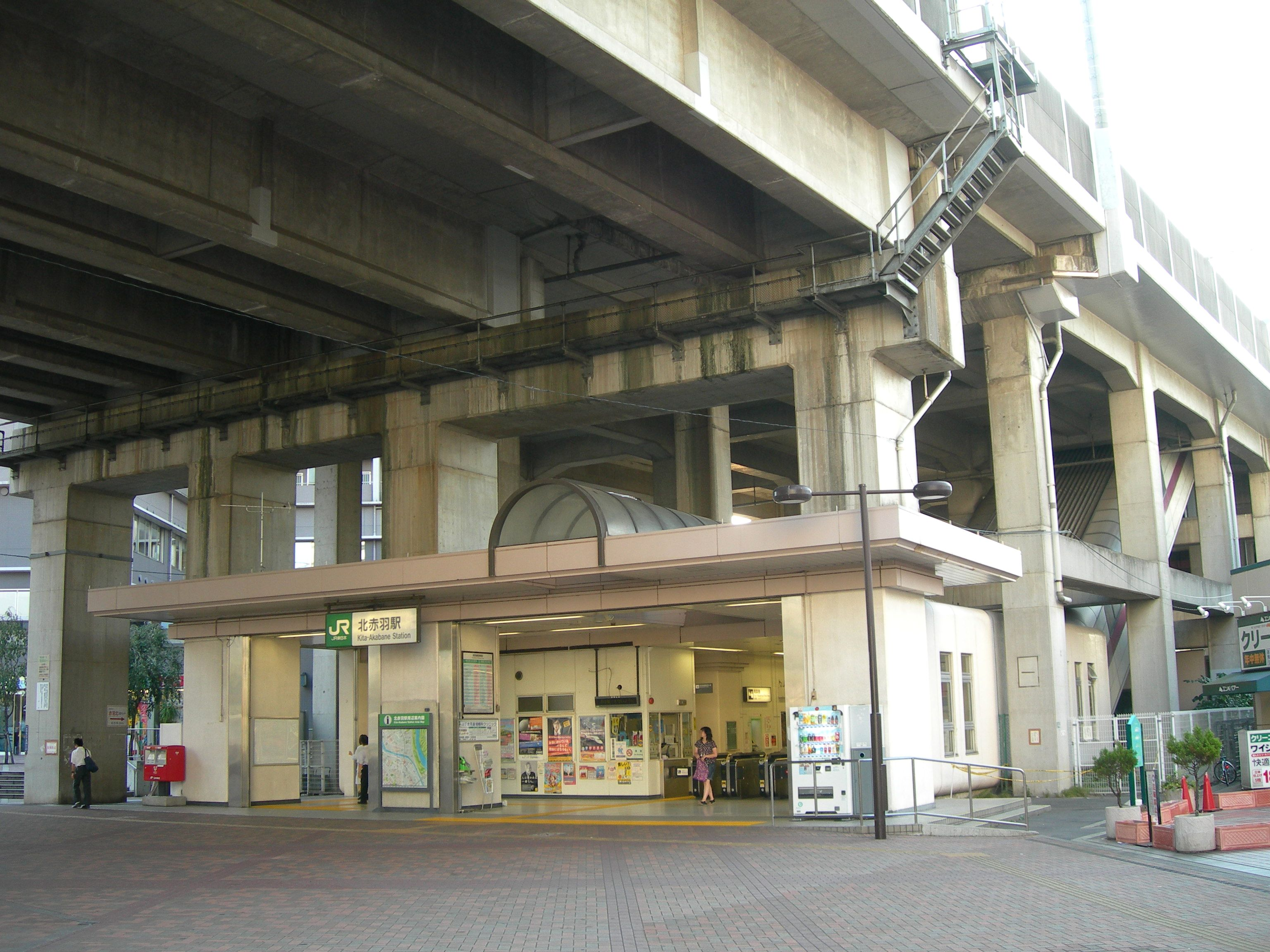
- Akabane exit of Kita-Akabane Station, August 2009

General information
- Location: 2 Akabane-Kita, Kita, Tokyo （東京都北区赤羽北2丁目） Japan
- Operator: JR East
- Line: Saikyō Line
- Connections: Bus stop

History
- Opened: 30 September 1985

Passengers
- FY2011: 17,295 daily

Services
Preceding station	JR East	Following station
Akabane towards Ōsaki	Saikyō Line Local	Ukima-Funado JA17 towards Ōmiya
Location

Kita-Akabane Station (北赤羽駅, Kita-Akabane-eki) is a railway station on the Saikyō Line in Kita, Tokyo, Japan, operated by the East Japan Railway Company (JR East).

== Lines ==
Kita-Akabane Station is served by the Saikyō Line which runs between Ōsaki in Tokyo and Ōmiya in Saitama Prefecture. Some trains continue northward to Kawagoe via the Kawagoe Line and southward to Shin-Kiba via the TWR Rinkai Line. The station is located 7.0 km north of Ikebukuro Station. The station identification colour is "lilac".

== Station layout ==
The station consists of one elevated island platform serving two tracks. The tracks of the Tōhoku Shinkansen also run adjacent to this station, on the west side.

=== Platforms ===
1	Saikyō Line	for Akabane, Shinjuku, and Ōsaki; Rinkai Line for Shin-Kiba
2	Saikyō Line	for Musashi-Urawa, Ōmiya, and Kawagoe

== History ==
Kita-Akabane Station opened on 30 September 1985.

== Passenger statistics ==
In fiscal 2011, the station was used by an average of 17,295 passengers daily (boarding passengers only).

The passenger figures for previous years are as shown below.

Fiscal year	Daily average
2000	15,636
2005	16,819
2010	17,494
2011	17,295

== Surrounding area ==
- Arakawa River
- Tokyo Mizube Line
- Ukima Library
- Tokyo-Kita Social Insurance Hospital

== See also ==
- List of railway stations in Japan
