= Yonohommachi Station =

Railway station in Saitama, Japan

JA24 Yonohommachi Station 与野本町駅
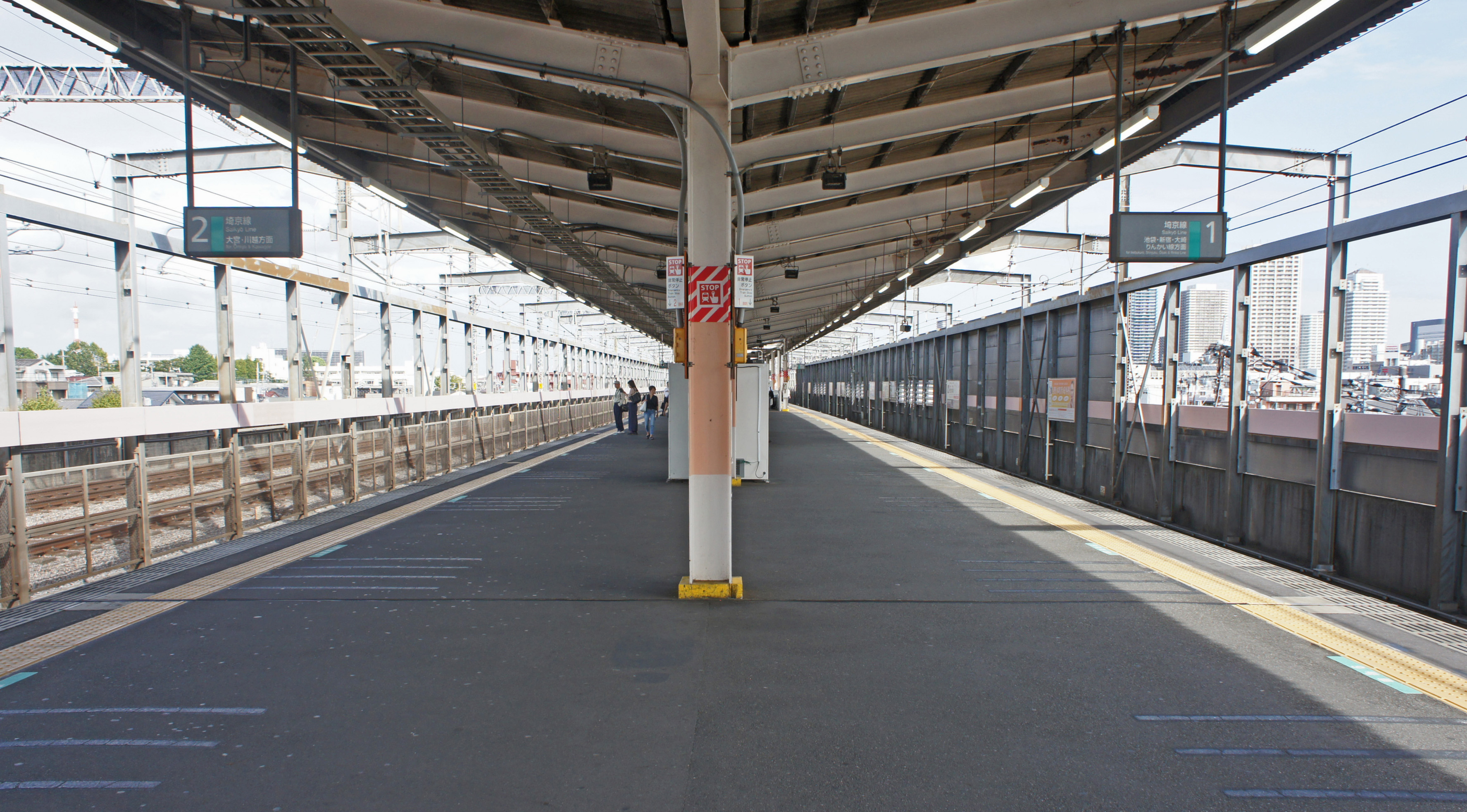
- JR Yono-Hommachi Station Platform

General information
- Location: 2-3-11 Honmachi-Higashi, Chūō-ku, Saitama-shi, Saitama-ken 338-0003; Japan
- Coordinates: 35°52′52.11″N 139°37′33.72″E
- Operator: JR East
- Line: ■Saikyō Line
- Distance: 20.6 km from Ikebukuro
- Platforms: 1 island platform
- Connections: Bus stop

Other information
- Status: Staffed
- Station code: JA24
- Website: Official website

History
- Opened: 30 September 1985

Passengers
- FY2019: 15,556 daily

Services
Preceding station	JR East	Following station
Minami-Yono JA23 towards Ōsaki	Saikyō Line Rapid Local	Kita-Yono JA25 towards Ōmiya
Location
- Location within Saitama Prefecture Location within Japan

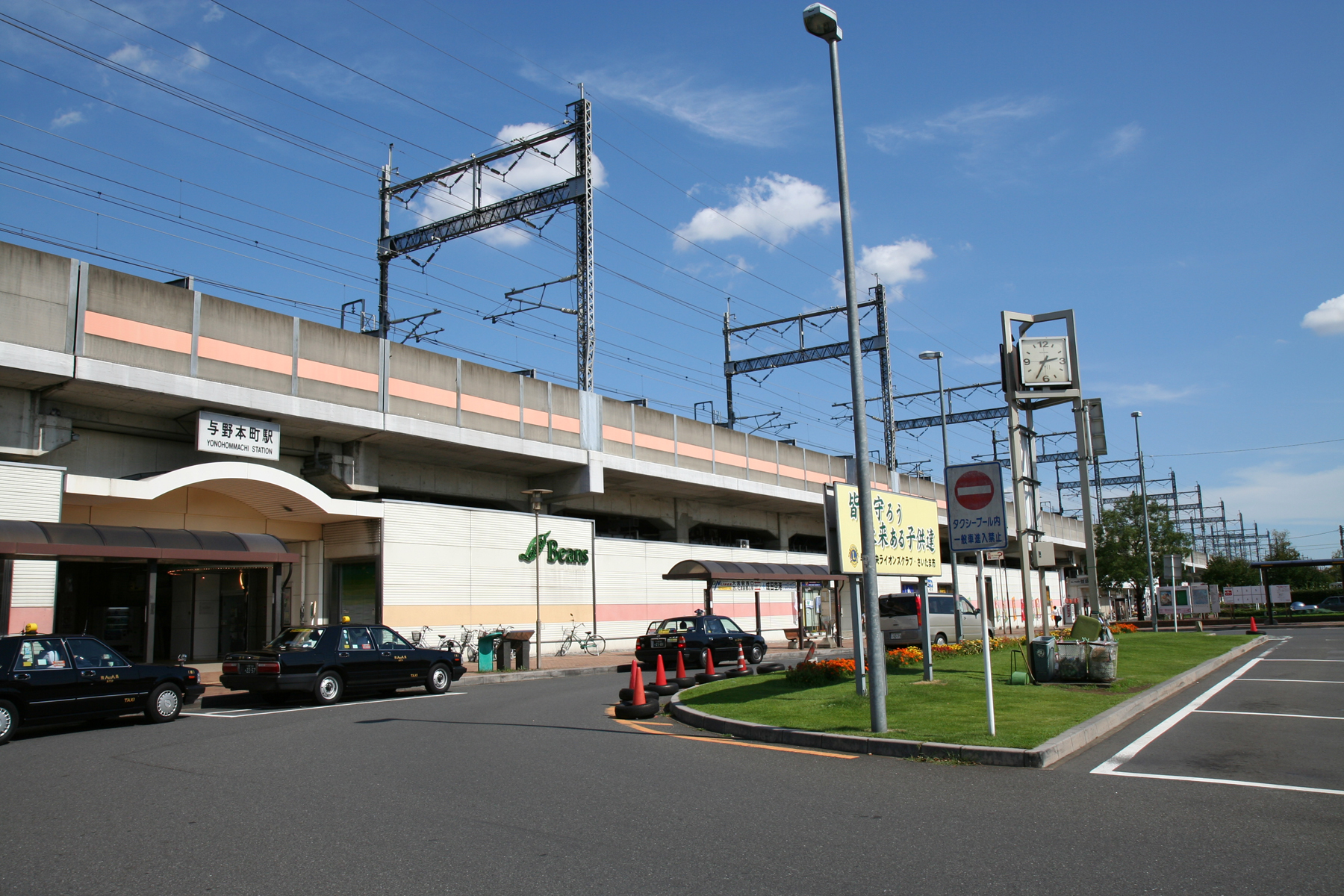
West entrance of Yonohommachi Station, August 2007

Yonohommachi Station (与野本町駅, Yonohonmachi-eki) is a passenger railway station on the Saikyō Line located in Chūō-ku, Saitama, Saitama Prefecture, Japan, operated by the East Japan Railway Company (JR East).

== Lines ==
Yonohommachi Station is served by the Saikyō Line which runs between Ōsaki in Tokyo and Ōmiya in Saitama Prefecture. Some trains continue northward to Kawagoe via the Kawagoe Line and southward to Shin-Kiba via the TWR Rinkai Line. The station is located 20.6 km from Ikebukuro Station. The station identification colour is "flesh".

== Station layout ==
The station consists of one elevated island platform serving two tracks, with the station building located underneath. The tracks of the Tōhoku Shinkansen also run adjacent to this station, on the west side. The station is staffed.

=== Platforms ===
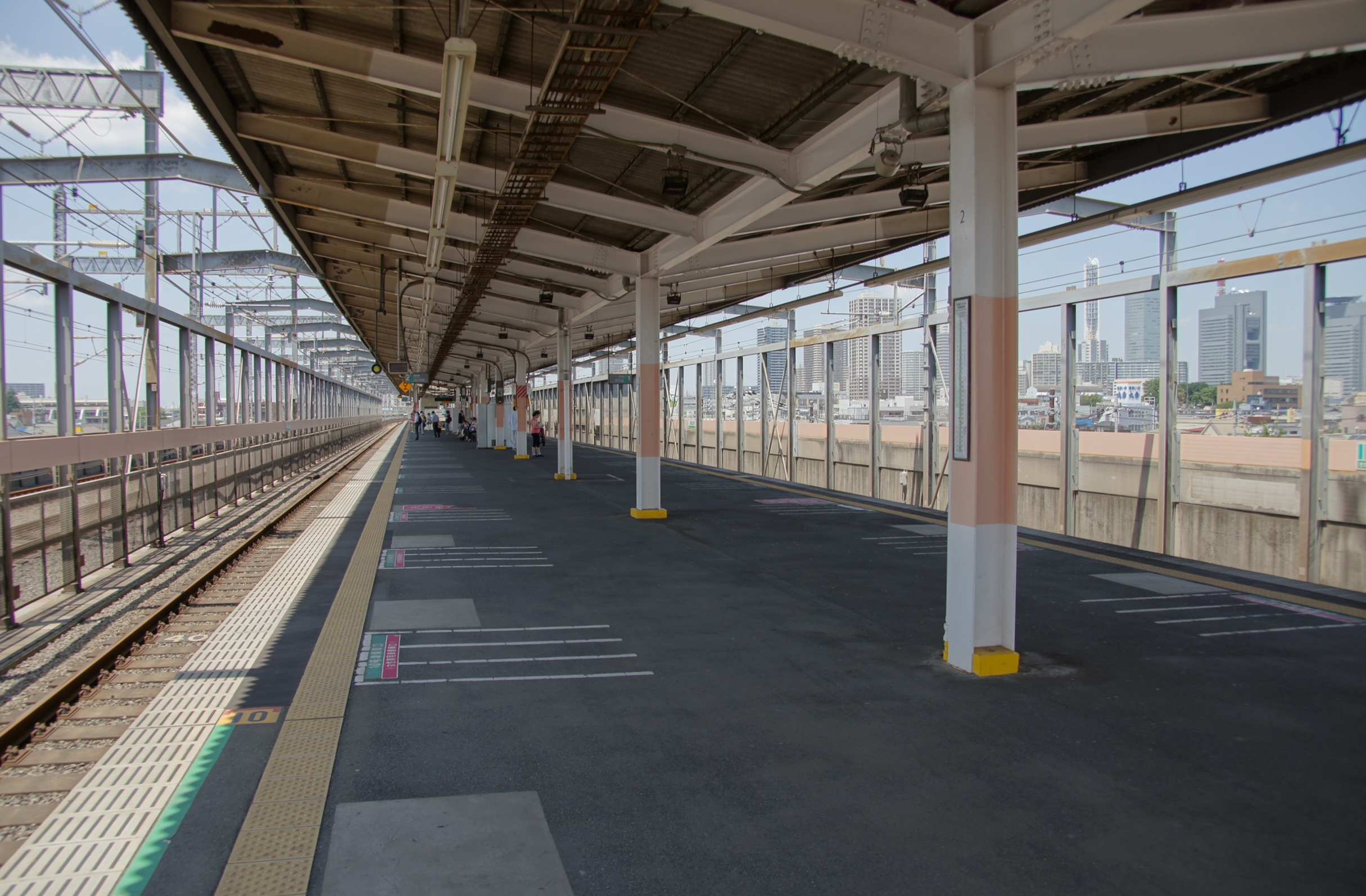
View from the south end of the platform, with the Tohoku Shinkansen tracks on the left, May 2013

1	Saikyō Line	for Musashi-Urawa, Akabane, Shinjuku and Ōsaki; Rinkai Line for Shin-Kiba
2	Saikyō Line	for Ōmiya and Kawagoe

== History ==
The station opened on 30 September 1985.

== Passenger statistics ==
In fiscal 2019, the station was used by an average of 15,556 passengers daily (boarding passengers only). The passenger figures for previous years are as shown below.

Fiscal year	Daily average
2000	13,282
2005	13,850
2010	13,791
2015	14,869

== Surrounding area ==
- Yono Station (on the Keihin-Tohoku Line)
- Saitama Chūō-ku Ward Office
- Yono Post Office
- Saitama Regional Immigration Office
- Saitama Yono High School
- National Route 17
- Yono Park
- Sai-no-Kuni Saitama Arts Theater

== See also ==
- List of railway stations in Japan
