= Sotetsu 12000 series =

Japanese train type

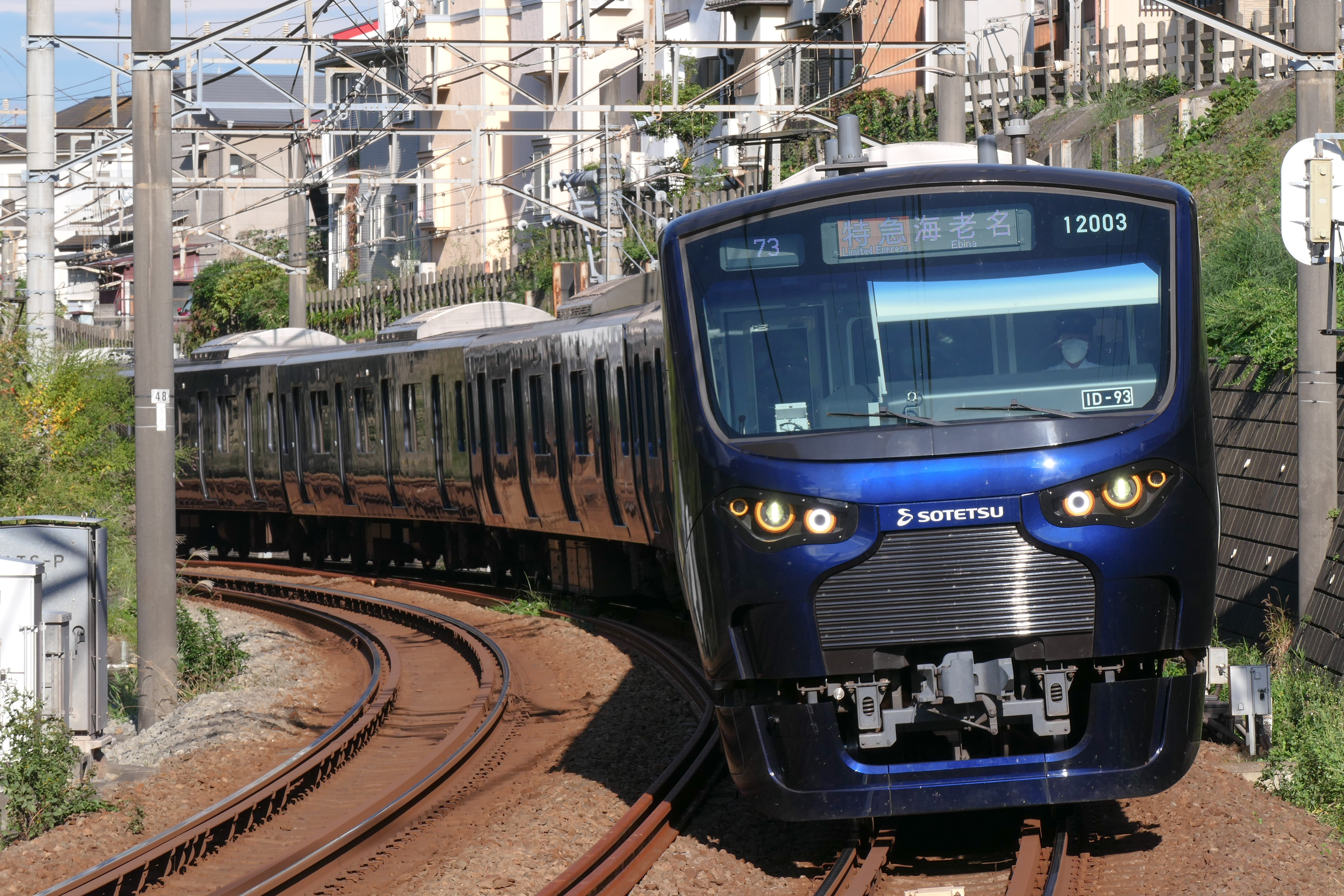
- Sotetsu 12000 series on the Sotetsu Main Line in October 2020
- In service: 20 April 2019 – present
- Manufacturer: J-TREC
- Family name: Sustina S24 Series
- Constructed: 2018–2020
- Number built: 60 cars (6 sets)
- Number in service: 60 cars (6 sets)
- Formation: 10 cars per trainset
- Capacity: 1,552 total
- Operator: Sotetsu
- Depot: Kashiwadai
- Lines served: Sōtetsu Main Line; Sōtetsu Izumino Line; Sōtetsu Shin-Yokohama Line; Sōtetsu-JR Link Line

Specifications
- Car body construction: Stainless steel
- Doors: 4 pairs per side
- Maximum speed: 120 km/h (75 mph)
- Traction system: IGBT-VVVF
- Power output: 140 kW (190 hp) per motor
- Electric system: 1,500 V DC overhead lines
- Current collection: Pantograph
- Safety systems: TASC, ATACS
- Track gauge: 1,067 mm (3 ft 6 in)

The Sotetsu 12000 series (相鉄12000系) is an electric multiple unit (EMU) train type operated by the private railway operator Sagami Railway (Sotetsu) in Japan. A total of six ten-car sets were built by Japan Transport Engineering Company (J-TREC) for use on Sōtetsu Shin-Yokohama Line services.

== Formation ==
The trains are formed as ten-car sets. The sets are formed as shown below.

	← Yokohama Ebina →									
Car No.	1	2	3	4	5	6	7	8	9	10
Designation	KuHa 12100 (Tc2)	DeHa 12200 (M6)	DeHa 12300 (M5)	DeHa 12400 (M4)	DeHa 12500 (M3)	SaHa 12600 (T2)	SaHa 12700 (T1)	DeHa 12800 (M2)	DeHa 12900 (M1)	KuHa 12000 (Tc1)
Weight (t)	31.6	31.1	33.1	34.0	34.0	29.7	30.3	34.0	33.4	31.3
Capacity (total/seated)	140/39	159/51	159/51	159/51	159/51	159/51	159/51	159/51	159/51	140/39

Cars 3 and 9 each have one single-arm pantograph, and car 5 has two.

== Interior ==
The interior is based on that of the 20000 series and has LED lighting which adjusts automatically according to the time of day. Spaces for wheelchairs and strollers are also provided; they also feature surveillance cameras.

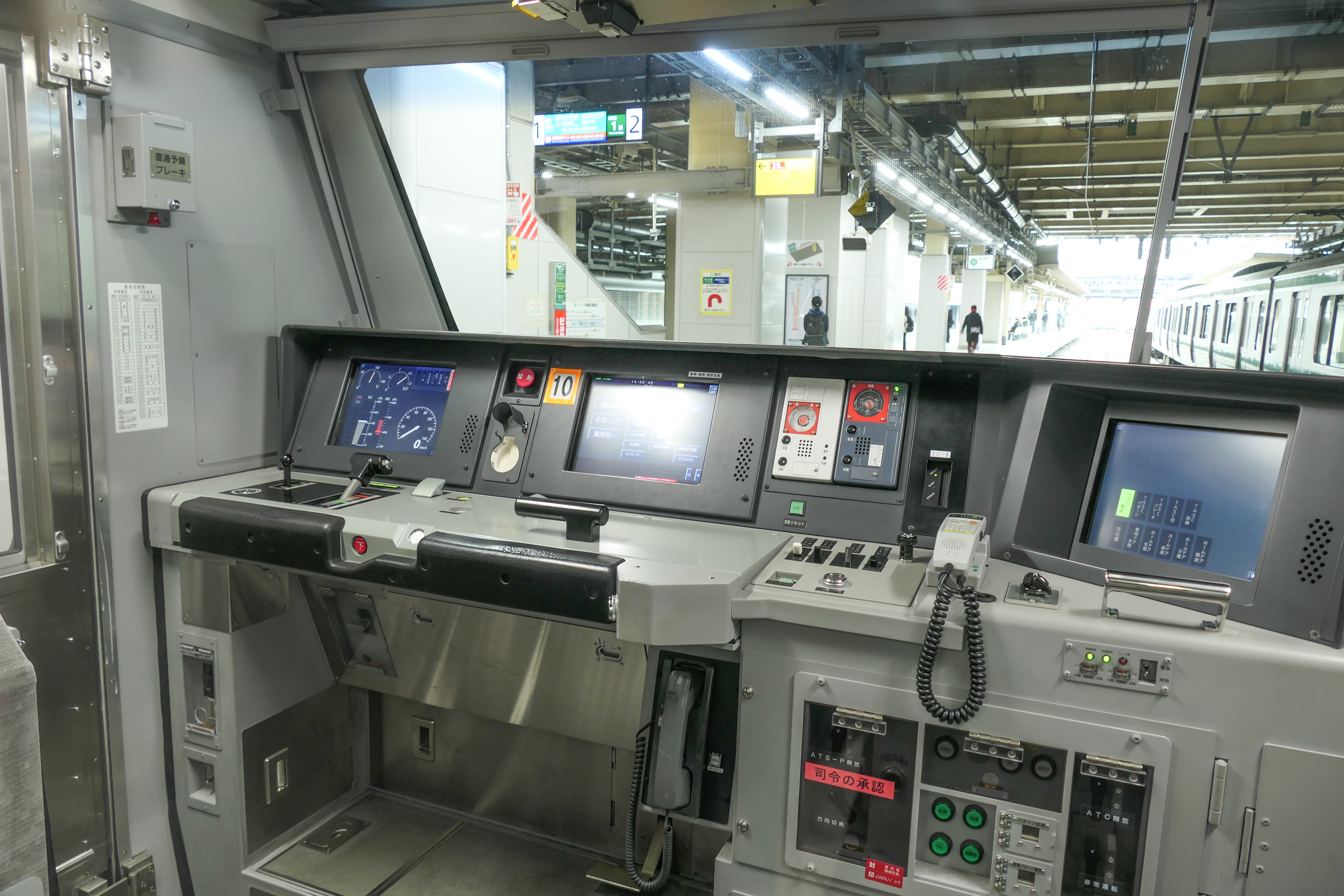
Driver's cab

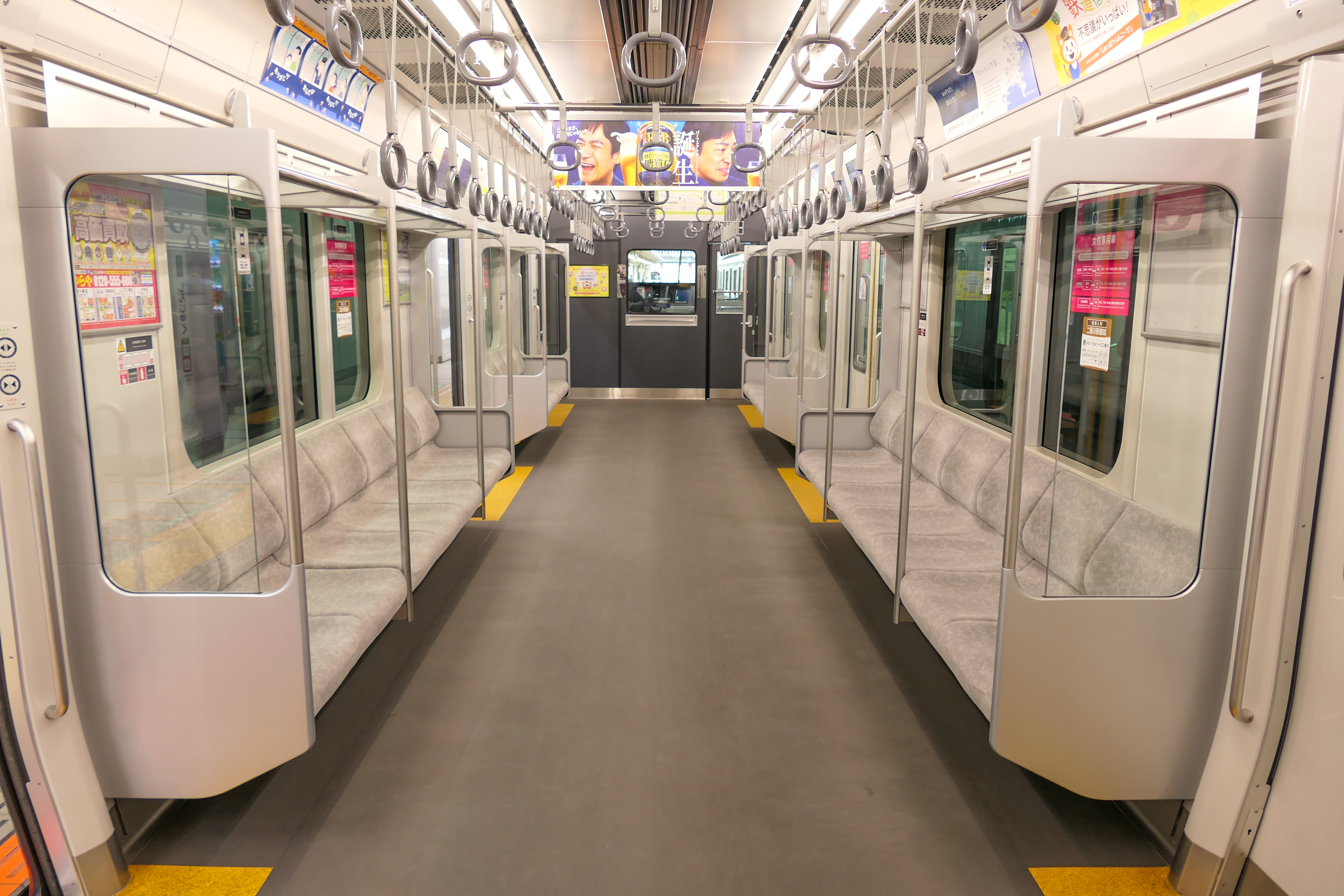
Interior view

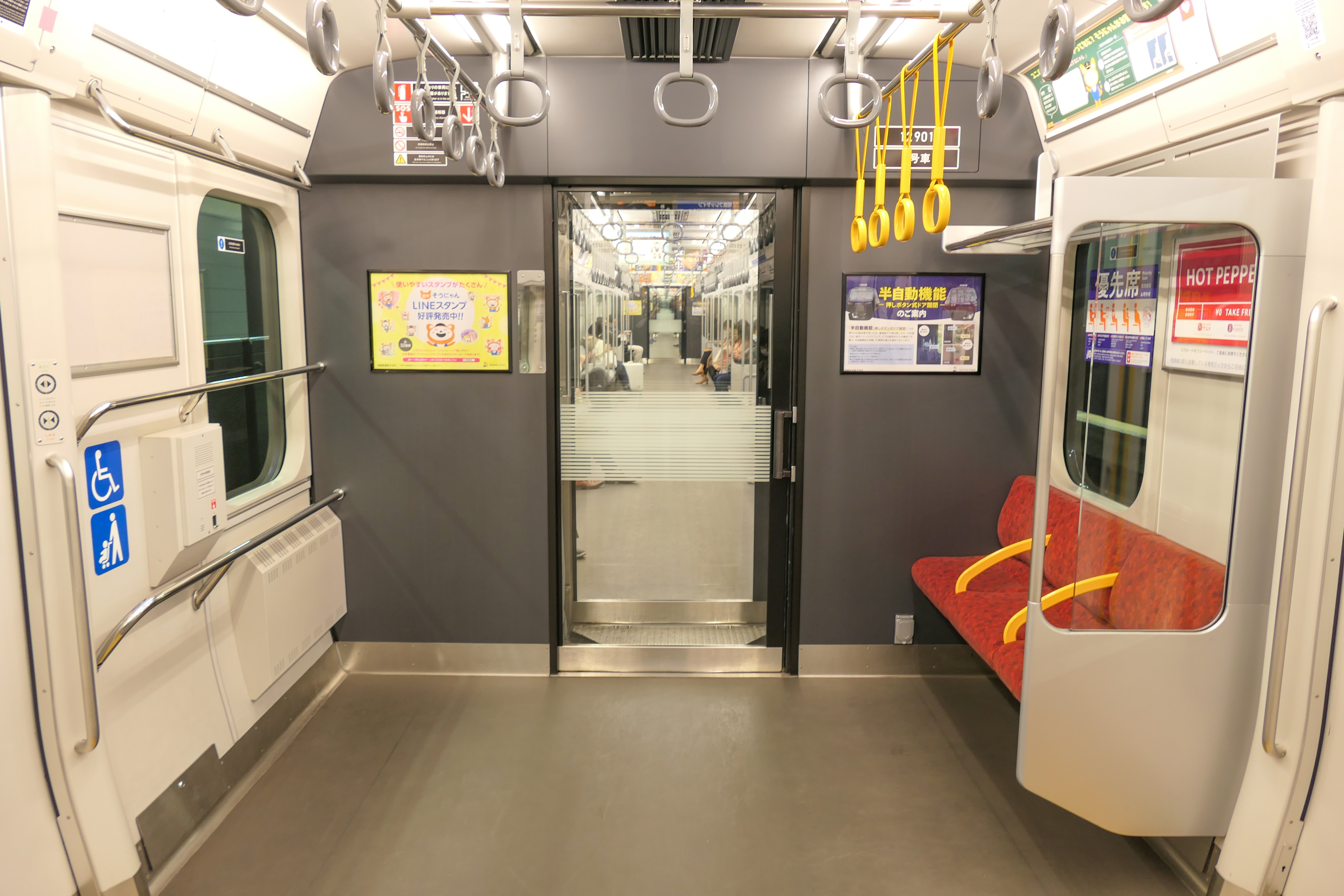
Priority seating with wheelchair/stroller space

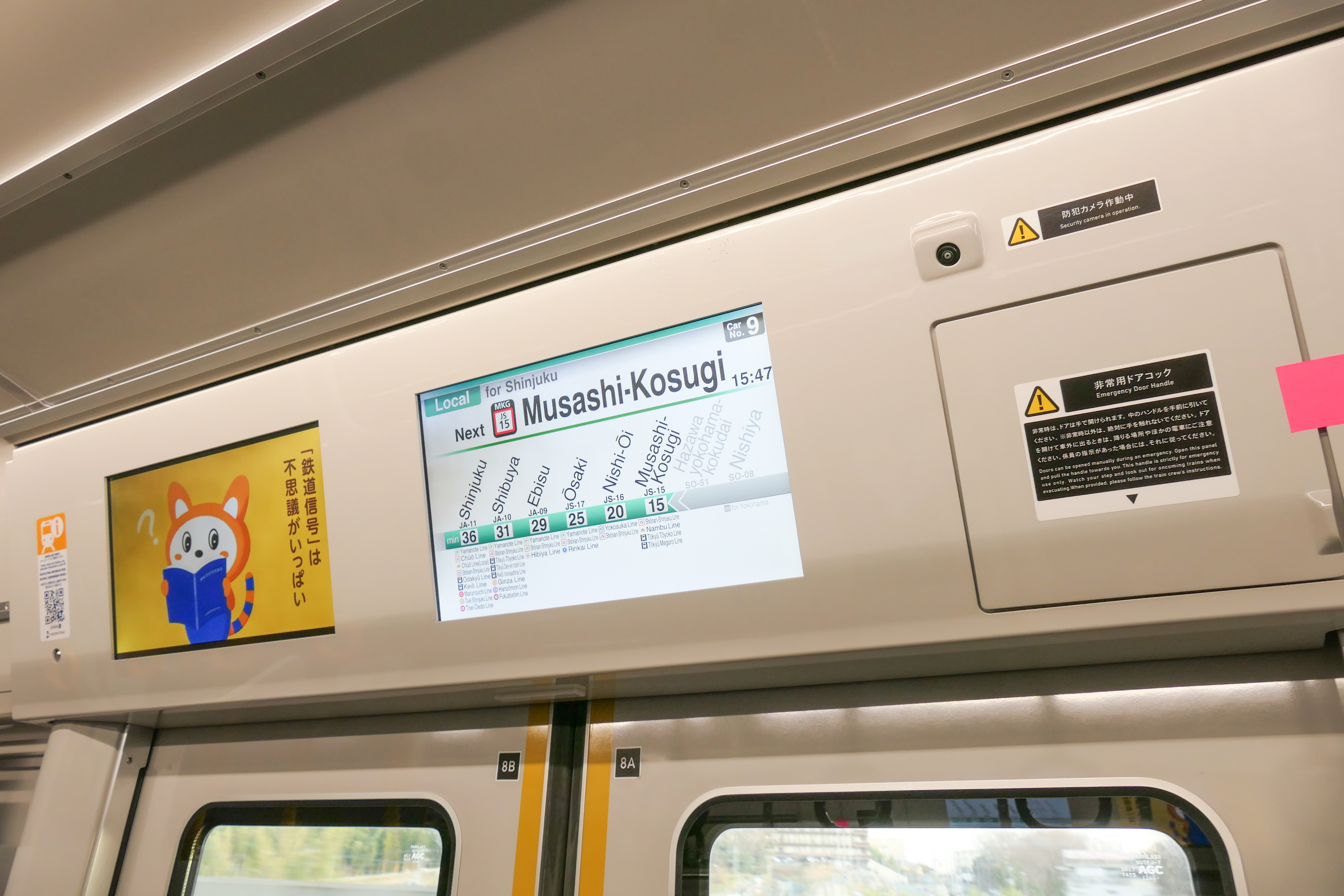
LCD passenger information displays (left) and security camera (right)

== Technical specifications ==
The 12000 series trains are built by J-TREC as part of their "Sustina S24 Series" design, and use VVVF-IGBT technology. They have stainless steel car bodies, which are painted in the "Yokohama Navy Blue" corporate livery. They also feature internal and external door buttons.

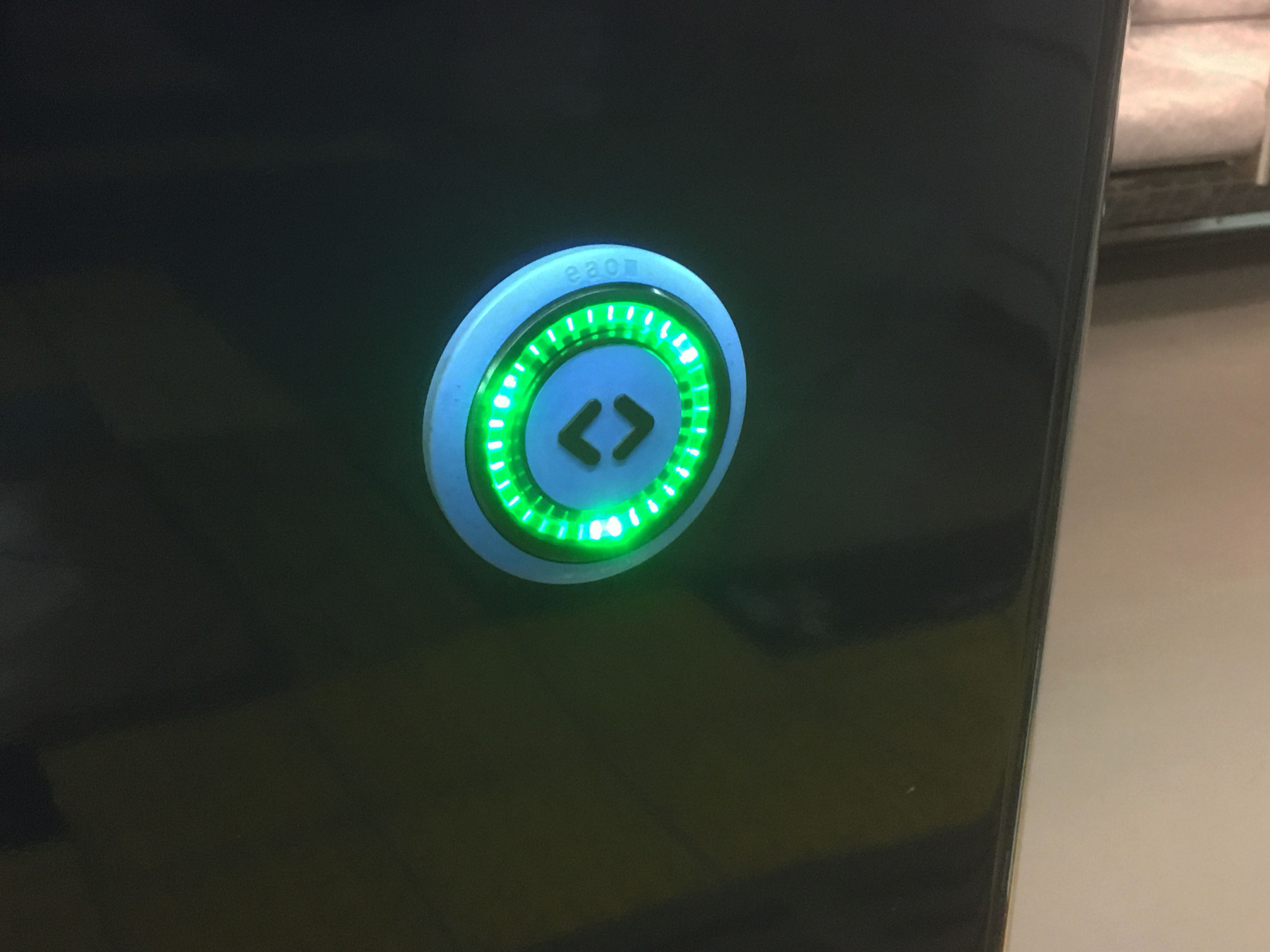
Door button (exterior)

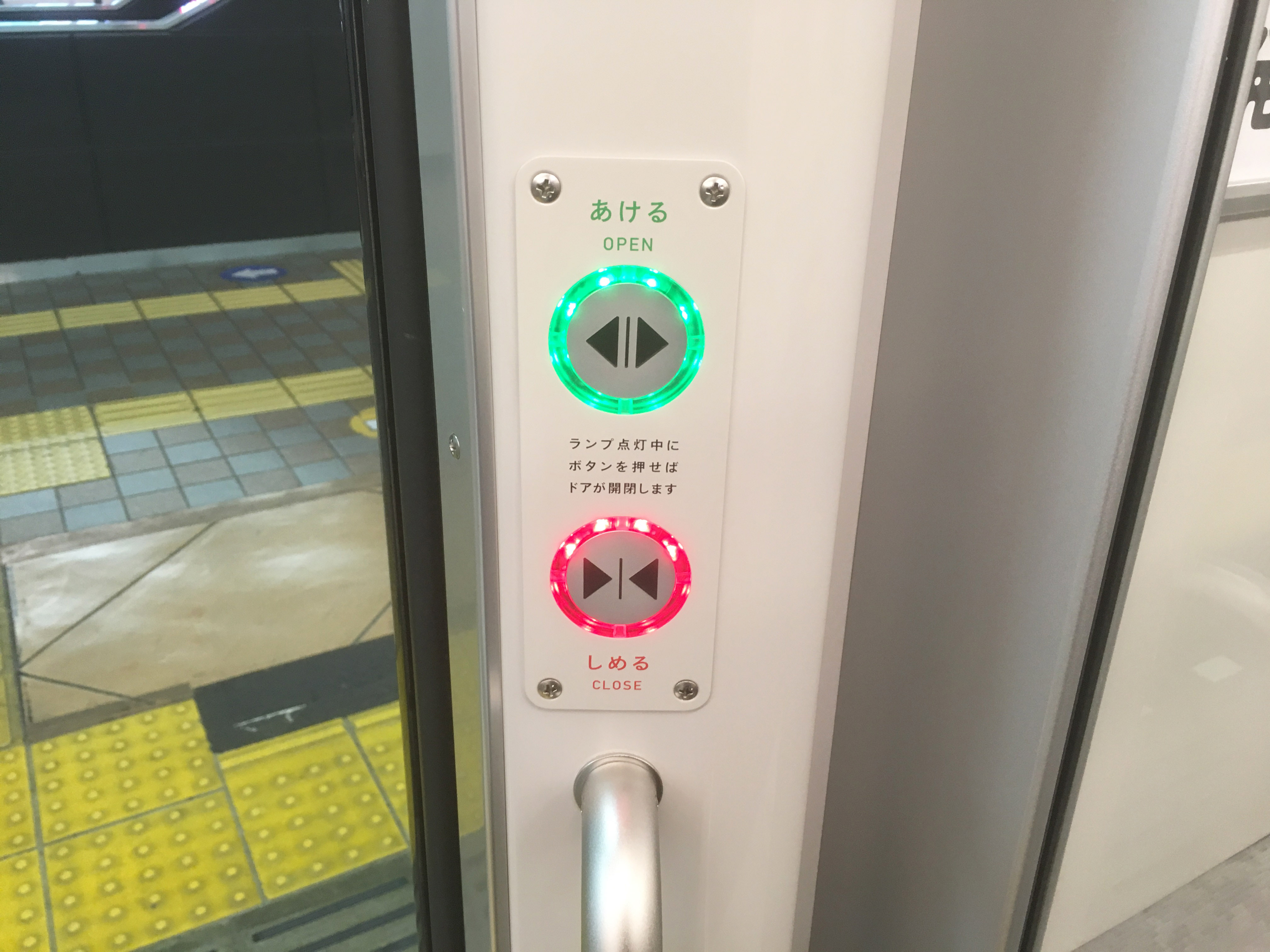
Door button panel (interior)

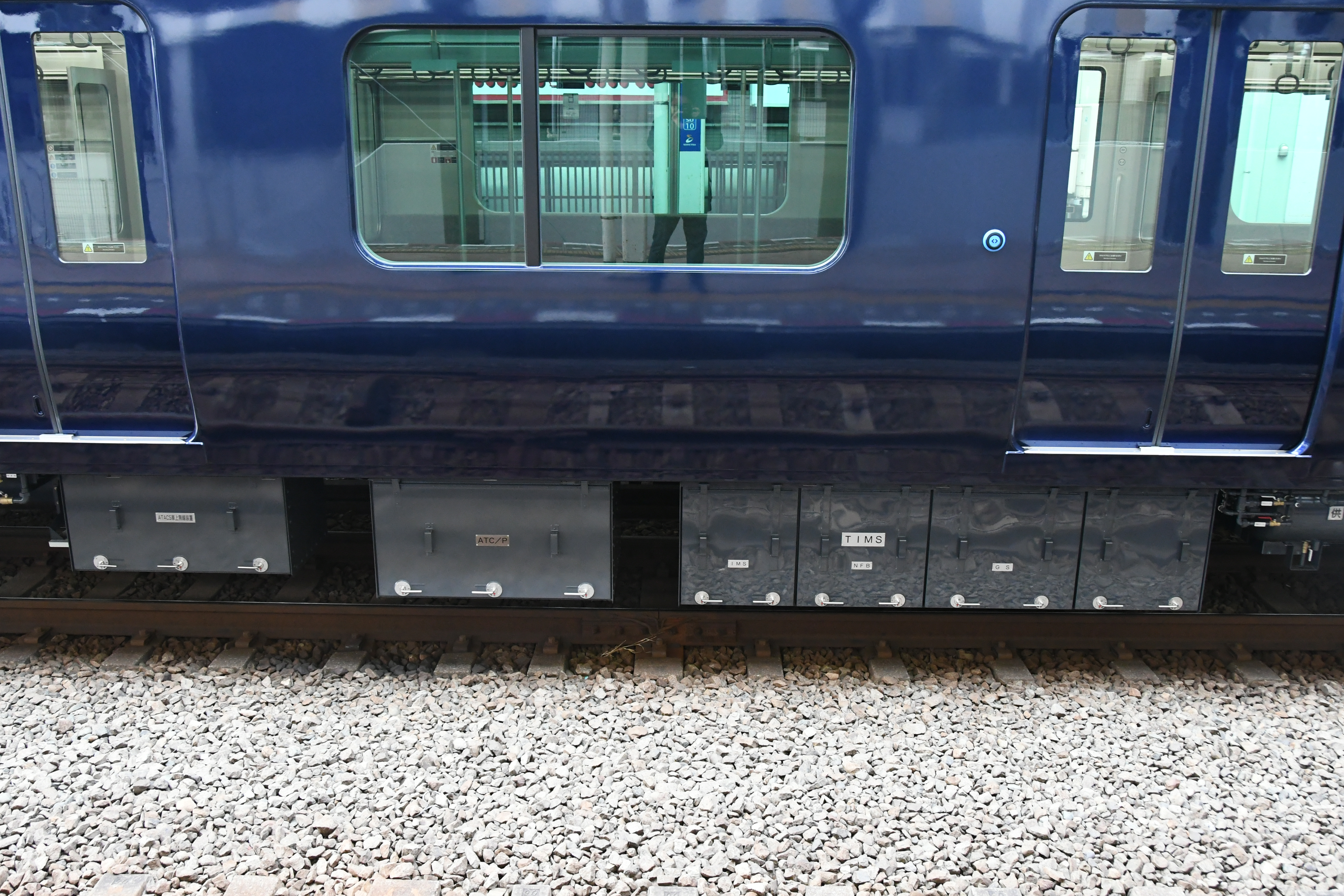
Underside equipment

== History ==
In April 2018, Sotetsu announced the introduction of a new train type for Sōtetsu JR Link Line services. The first set was delivered from J-TREC in December 2018. The trains entered revenue service on 20 April 2019. All six sets are scheduled to be introduced by the end of 2019.

== See also ==
- Sotetsu 20000 series
