= Toda-Kōen Station =

Railway station in Toda, Saitama Prefecture, Japan

JA18 Toda-kōen Station 戸田公園駅
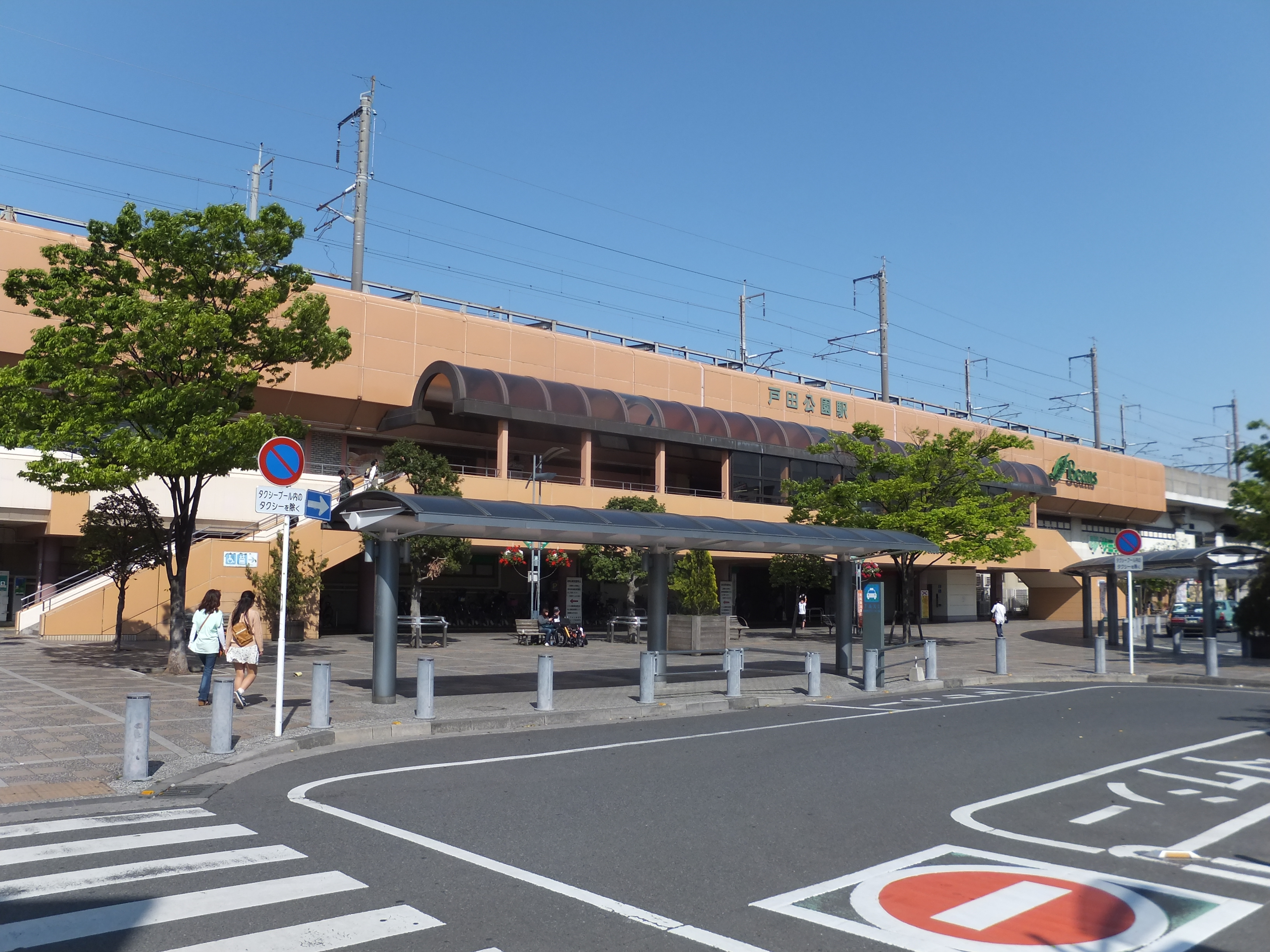
- Toda-kōen Station west exit, April 2014

General information
- Location: 4 Honchō, Toda-shi, Saitama-ken 335-0023; Japan
- Coordinates: 35°48′28.7352″N 139°40′40.9836″E
- Operator: JR East
- Line: Saikyō Line
- Distance: 24.4 km from Ōsaki
- Platforms: 1 island platform
- Connections: Bus stop

Other information
- Status: Staffed ("Midori no Madoguchi")
- Website: Official website

History
- Opened: 30 September 1985

Passengers
- FY2019: 34,478

Services
Preceding station	JR East	Following station
Akabane towards Ōsaki	Saikyō Line Rapid	Musashi-Urawa JA21 towards Ōmiya
Ukima-Funado JA17 towards Ōsaki	Saikyō Line Local	Toda JA19 towards Ōmiya
Location
- Location within Saitama Prefecture Location within Japan

Toda-kōen Station (戸田公園駅, Toda-kōen-eki) is a passenger railway station located in the city of Toda, Saitama, Japan, operated by the East Japan Railway Company (JR East).

== Lines ==
Toda-Kōen Station is served by the Saikyō Line which runs between Ōsaki in Tokyo and Ōmiya in Saitama Prefecture. Some trains continue northward to Kawagoe via the Kawagoe Line and southward to Shin-Kiba via the TWR Rinkai Line. The station is located 11.0 km north of Ikebukuro Station. The station identification colour is sky blue.

== Station layout ==
The station consists of one elevated island platform serving two tracks, with the station building underneath. Additional passing tracks lie on either side of the station for non-stop rapid services. The tracks of the Tōhoku Shinkansen also run adjacent to this station, on the west side.

=== Platforms ===
1
2
Saikyō Line
Saikyō Line
for Akabane, Shinjuku, Ōsaki,
Rinkai Line for Shin-Kiba

for Musashi-Kosugi, Hazawa yokohama-kokudai
Sotetsu Line for Nishiya and Ebina

for Musashi-Urawa, Ōmiya, and Kawagoe

An arrangement of the Toda City song has been used as the departure melody for trains departing from the up platform (platform 1) since 1 August 2007.

== History ==
Toda-kōen Station opened on 30 September 1985.

== Passenger statistics ==
In fiscal 2019, the station was used by an average of 34,478 passengers daily (boarding passengers only). The passenger figures for previous years are as shown below.

Fiscal year	Daily average
2000	23,769
2005	27,767
2010	29,336
2015	34,944

== Surrounding area ==
- Arakawa River
- Toda Park, after which the station is named
- Boat Race Toda boat racing circuit
- Toda Rowing Course
- Toda Chuo General Hospital
- National Route 17

== See also ==
- List of railway stations in Japan
