= Chūō-ku, Saitama =

Chūō-ku, Saitama 中央区
- Ward
- Chūō Ward
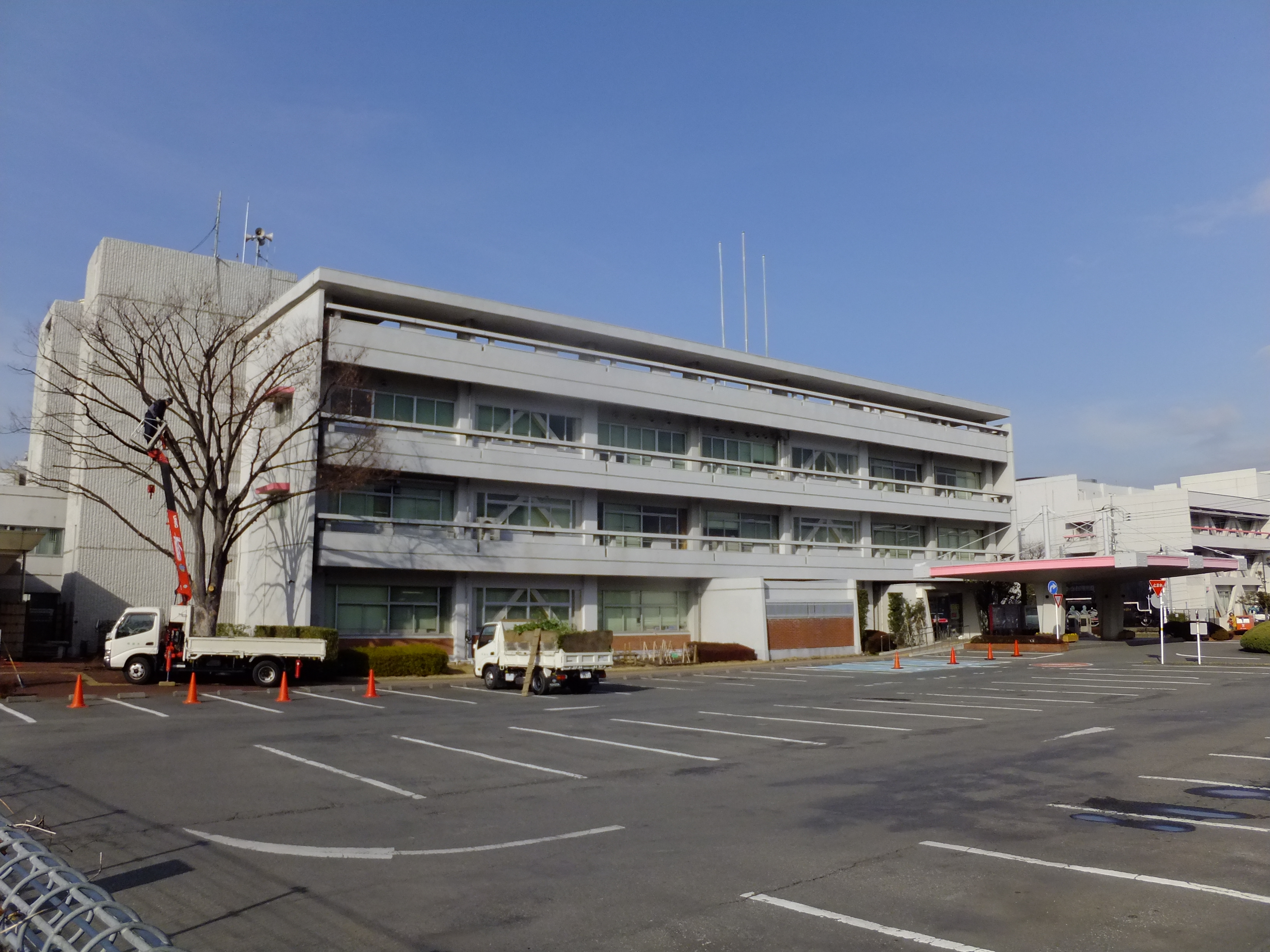
- Chūō Ward Office, Saitama City

- Seal

- Location of Chūō-ku in Saitama

- Coordinates: 35°53′2.1″N 139°37′34.4″E
- Country: Japan
- Region: Kantō
- Prefecture: Saitama
- City: Saitama

Area
  - Total: 8.39 km^{2} (3.24 sq mi)

Population (March 2021)
  - Total: 102,364
  - Density: 12,200/km^{2} (31,600/sq mi)
- Time zone: UTC+9 (Japan Standard Time)
- -Flower: Rose
- Phone number: 048-856-1111
- Address: 5-7-10 Shimoochiai, Chūō-ku, Saitama-shi, Saitama-ken 338-0002
- Website: www.city.saitama.jp/chuo/index.html

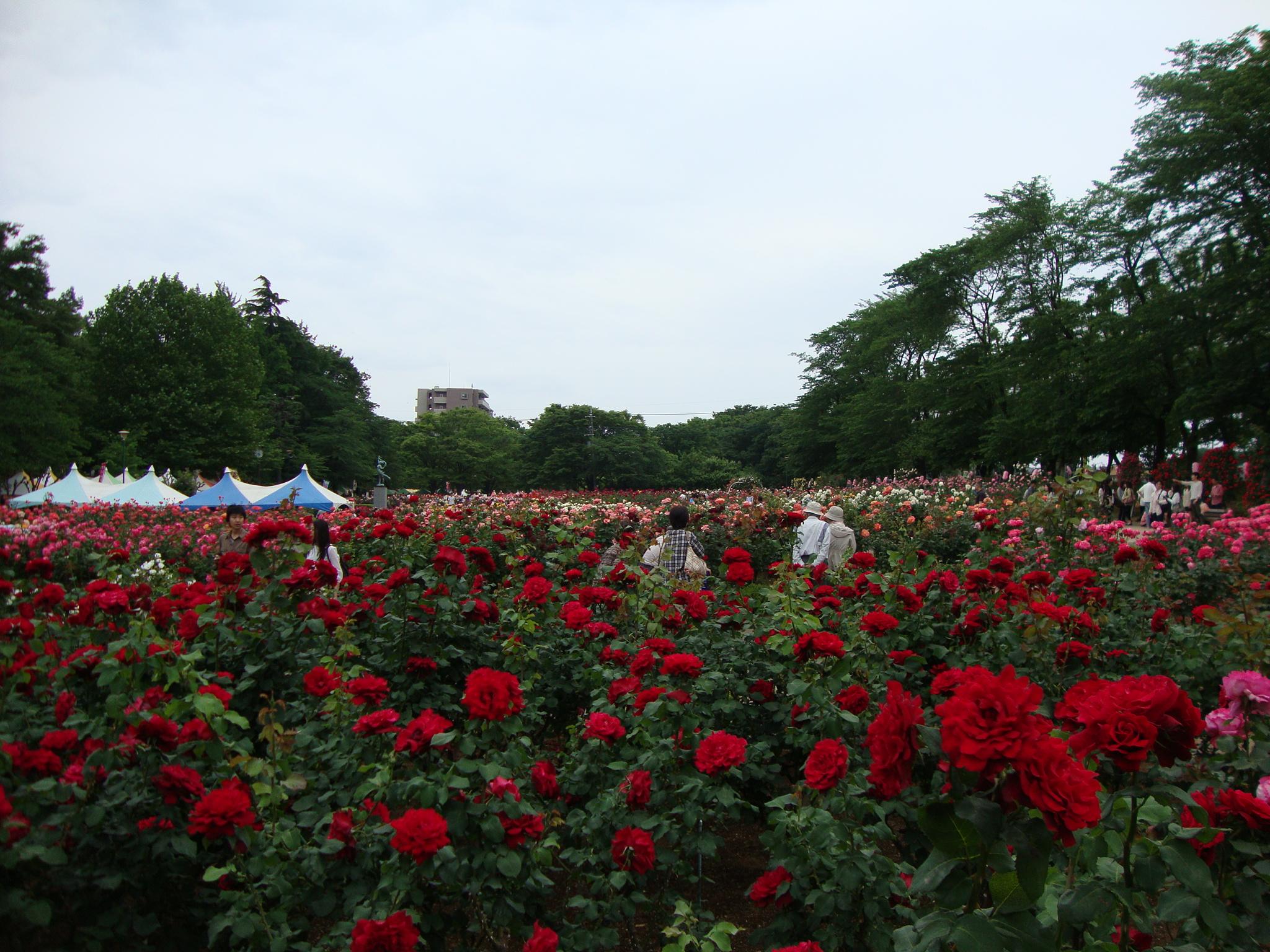
Yono Park

Chūō-ku (中央区, lit. "Central ward") is one of ten wards of the city of Saitama, in Saitama Prefecture, Japan, and is located in the northern part of the city. As of 1 March 2021, the ward had an estimated population of 102,364 and a population density of 12,000 persons per km^{2}. Its total area is 8.39 square kilometres (3.24 sq mi). Despite its name, it is not the administrative or the commercial centre of the city, roles which are designated to Urawa-ku and Ōmiya-ku respectively.

== Geography ==
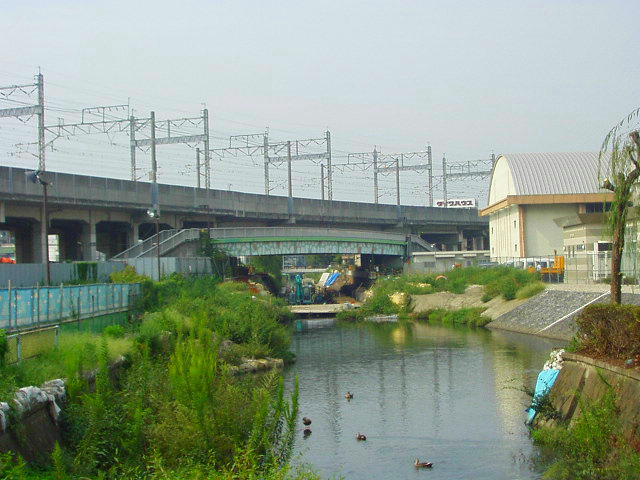
The Kōnuma River flowing through Chūō-ku

=== Shape and Location ===
Chūō-ku is located to the west of the center of Saitama City, the capital of Saitama Prefecture. Chūō-ku is wedge-shaped with a southern tip. Measuring approximately 5.5 km in the north–south direction and approximately 3.5 km in the east–west direction, it has an area of 8.39 km^{2}. Located on the Kantō Plain, Chūō-ku has a low elevation. Its lowest point, located at Ōto-nichōme, has an elevation of 4.7 m above sea level and its highest point, located at Suzuya-yonchōme, has an elevation of 16.6 m above sea level. The majority of rivers run north–south down the ward, consequently travelling east–west across the ward requires travelling across alternating regions of plateaus and depressions. The easternmost of these plateaus is the Ōmiya-daichi, to the west of which lies the Kōnuma River which is at the centre of a 500-meter long depression. The Ōmiya-daichi continues to the west of this depression until it meets another depression due to the Arakawa River at the westernmost point of the ward.

=== Land Use ===
482.9 hectares of the ward's 839 hectares is used as a residential area and consequently the entire ward was designated a "densely inhabited district" (DID) in 2005. Despite the apparent lack of farming areas, some can be seen on either side of the Kōnuma River where, on the eastern bank, the ward office, fire station and library are also located. The northern tip of the ward is part of the Saitama New Urban Center where the broad-based local government of the Kantō district and the Saitama Super Arena are located.

=== Neighboring Municipalities ===
Saitama Prefecture

- Sakura-ku
- Minami-ku
- Urawa-ku
- Ōmiya-ku

=== Climate ===
The average temperature between 2007 and 2011 was 15.4 °C with an average of 53 days of sun. In terms of precipitation, Chūō-ku saw an average of 1359 mm per year of precipitation between 2007 and 2011 with an average of 108 days of rain and 10 days of snow.

Climate data for Chūō-ku, Saitama
Month	Jan	Feb	Mar	Apr	May	Jun	Jul	Aug	Sep	Oct	Nov	Dec	Year
Daily mean °C (°F)	3.1 (37.6)	5.5 (41.9)	6.9 (44.4)	13.4 (56.1)	17.9 (64.2)	22.7 (72.9)	27.2 (81.0)	26.8 (80.2)	24.4 (75.9)	18.0 (64.4)	12.6 (54.7)	5.3 (41.5)	15.4 (59.7)
Average precipitation mm (inches)	—	82.5 (3.25)	67.5 (2.66)	44.5 (1.75)	287.5 (11.32)	113.0 (4.45)	93.0 (3.66)	229.5 (9.04)	244.5 (9.63)	110.5 (4.35)	52.5 (2.07)	56.5 (2.22)	1,359 (53.5)
Source: http://www.city.saitama.jp/www/contents/1365151655919/index.html, 土地及び気象

== History ==
The town of Yono was created within Kitaadachi District, Saitama with the establishment of the municipalities system on April 1, 1889. Plans to dissolve the town and merge with Urawa and Ōmiya were rejected by a referendum in 1955, and Yono was raised to city status on July 15, 1958. On May 1, 2001, Yono merged with Urawa and Ōmiya to form the new city of Saitama. When Saitama was proclaimed a designated city in 2003, the area of corresponding to former Yono city, with some minor border adjustments from former Ōmiya and Urawa cities became Chūō Ward.

== Education ==
- Chūō-ku has eight elementary schools, four public and one private junior high schools, and three public high schools.

Municipal junior high schools:

- Hachioji (八王子中学校)
- Yono Higashi (与野東中学校)
- Yono Minami (与野南中学校)
- Yono Nishi (与野西中学校)

Municipal elementary schools:

- Kami Ochiai (上落合小学校)
- Oto (大戸小学校)
- Shimo Ochiai (下落合小学校)
- Suzuya (鈴谷小学校)
- Yono Hachiman (与野八幡小学校)
- Yono Honmachi (与野本町小学校)
- Yono Minami (与野南小学校)
- Yono Seihoku (与野西北小学校)

== Transportation ==
=== Railway ===
– Saikyō Line

- Minami-Yono - Yonohommachi - Kita-Yono

Yono Station and Saitama-Shintoshin Station on the Keihin-Tōhoku Line (the latter also on the Takasaki and Tōhoku Main Lines) straddle the border between Chūō-ku and other Saitama wards, but are officially located in Urawa-ku and Ōmiya-ku respectively.

=== Buses ===
- Kokusaikōgyō Bus operates in large sections of the ward.
- Seibu Bus operates mainly to the south of the ward.

=== Highway ===
- Shuto Expressway Ōmiya Route
- National Route 17
- National Route 463

== Local attractions ==
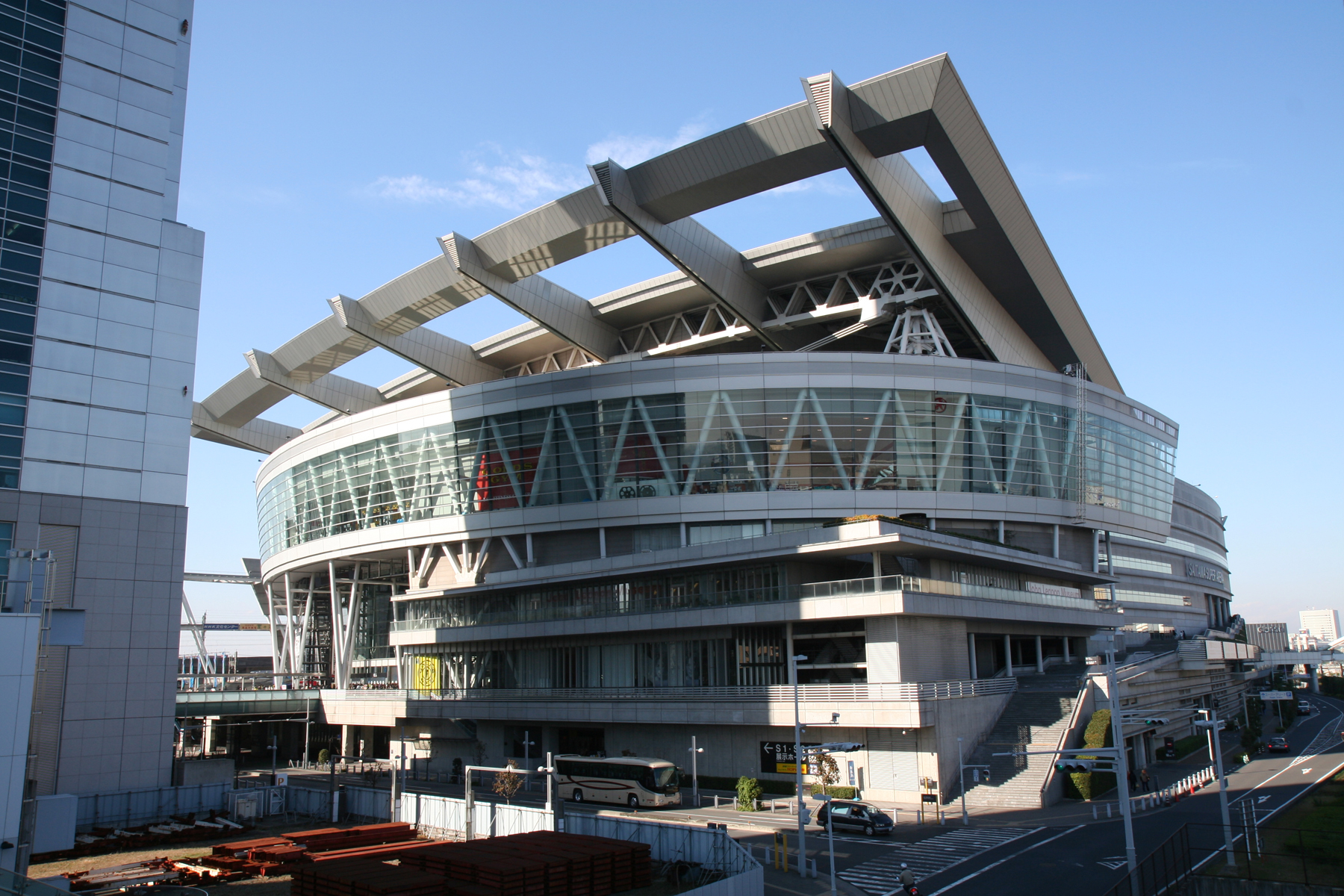
Saitama Super Arena

- Yono Park
- Saitama New Urban Center
- Saitama Super Arena
