= Saitama New Urban Center =

Business district in Saitama, Japan

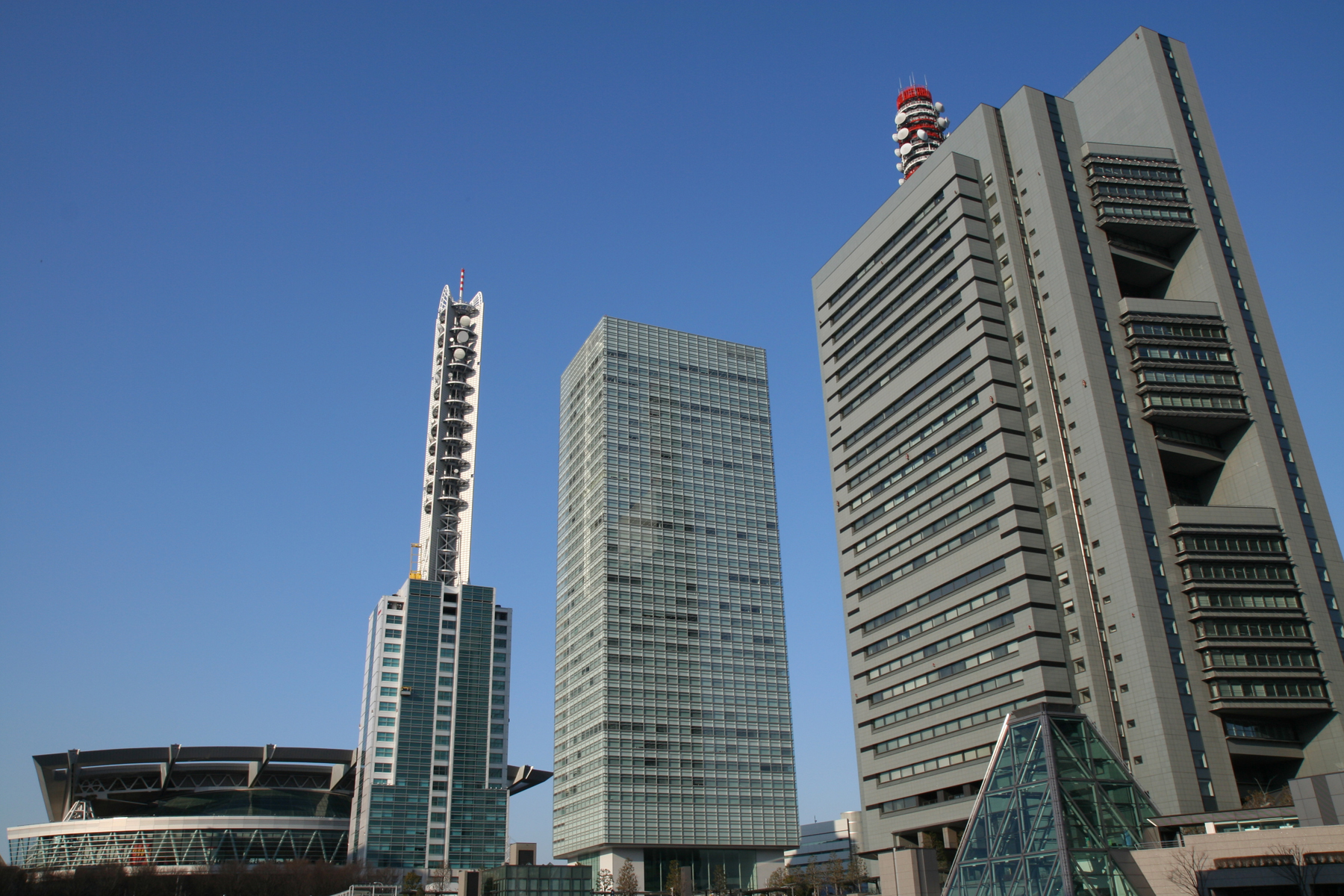

Saitama New Urban Center (さいたま新都心, Saitama Shin-Toshin) is a business district in Chūō-ku, Saitama, Japan. Among the buildings located in the district is the Saitama Super Arena.

The area is served by Saitama-Shintoshin Station.
