= Musashi-Urawa Station =

Railway station in Saitama, Japan

Coordinates: 35.846°N 139.648°E

JA21 JM26 Musashi-Urawa Station 武蔵浦和駅
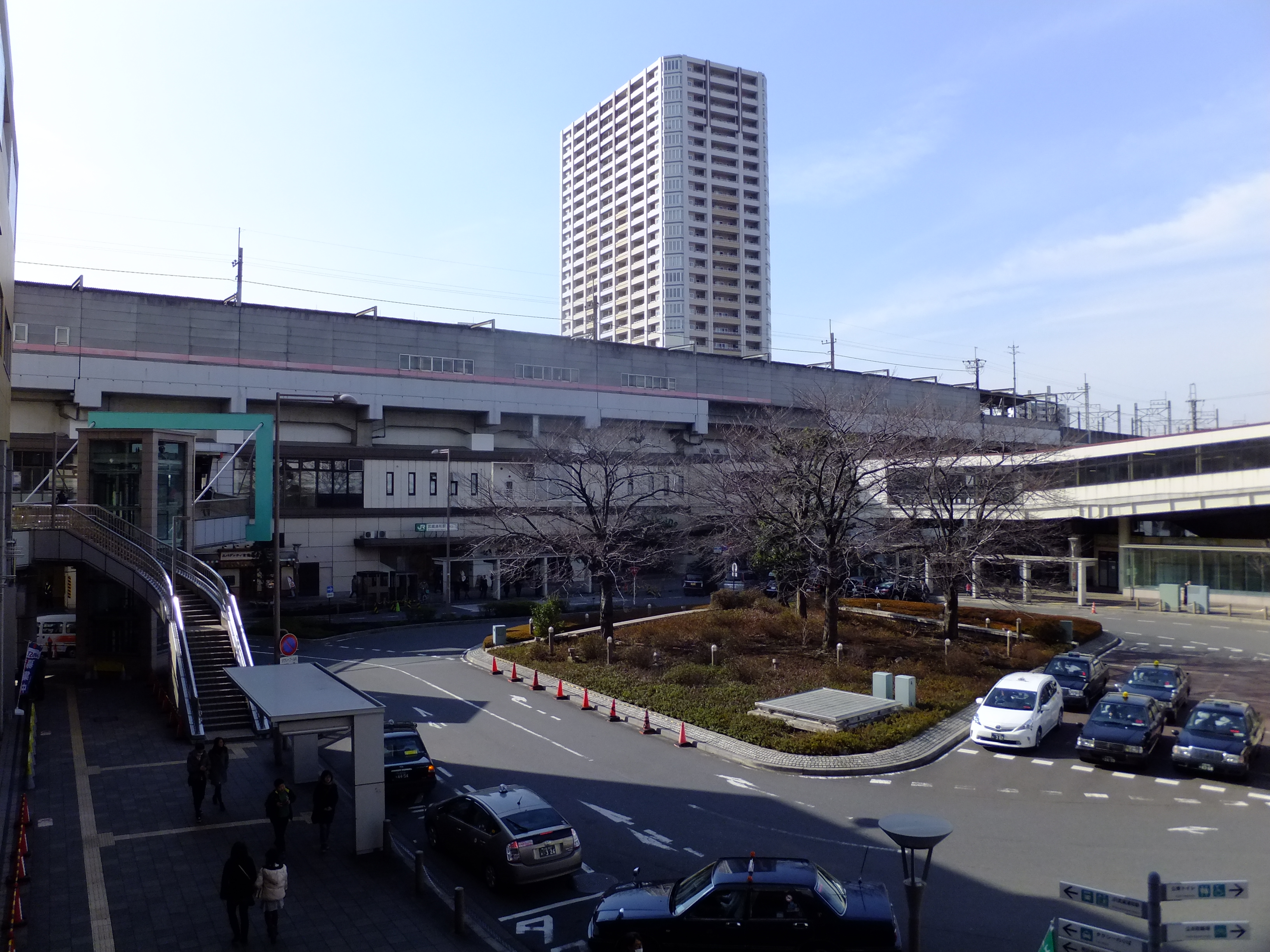
- The east exit of Musashi-Urawa Station

General information
- Location: 7 Bessho, Minami-ku, Saitama-shi, Saitama-ken 336-0021
- Operator: JR East
- Lines: Saikyō Line; Musashino Line
- Distance: 29.5 km to Ōsaki
- Platforms: 2 side + 2 island platforms

Other information
- Status: Staffed ("Midori no Madoguchi" )
- Website: Official website

History
- Opened: 30 September 1985

Passengers
- FY2019: 53,992 daily

Services
Preceding station	JR East	Following station
Akabane towards Ōsaki	Saikyō Line Commuter Rapid	Ōmiya Terminus
Toda-Kōen JA18 towards Ōsaki	Saikyō Line Rapid	Naka-Urawa JA22 towards Ōmiya
Kita-Toda JA20 towards Ōsaki	Saikyō Line Local	Naka-Urawa JA22 towards Ōmiya
Ōmiya Terminus	Shimōsa	Minami-Urawa JM25 towards Kaihimmakuhari
Nishi-Urawa JM27 towards Fuchūhommachi	Musashino Line	Minami-Urawa JM25 towards Kaihimmakuhari or Tokyo
Location
- Location within Saitama Prefecture Location within Japan

Musashi-Urawa Station (武蔵浦和駅, Musashi-Urawa-eki) is a junction passenger railway station located in Minami-ku, Saitama, Saitama Prefecture, Japan, operated by East Japan Railway Company (JR East).

== Lines ==
Musashi-Urawa Station is served by the orbital Musashino Line and the Saikyō Line which runs between Ōsaki in Tokyo and Ōmiya in Saitama Prefecture. Some trains continue northward to Kawagoe via the Kawagoe Line and southward to Shin-Kiba via the TWR Rinkai Line. The station is located 16.1 km from Ikebukuro Station on the Saikyo Line and 29.8 kilometers from Fuchūhommachi Station on the Musashino Line. The station identification colour for the Saikyō Line platforms is "cherry blossom".

== Station layout ==
The station has two elevated opposed side platforms serving two tracks for the Musashino Line, and two elevated island platforms serving four tracks for the Saikyō Line. The station building is located underneath the platforms.

The station has a "Midori no Madoguchi" staffed ticket office.

=== Platforms ===
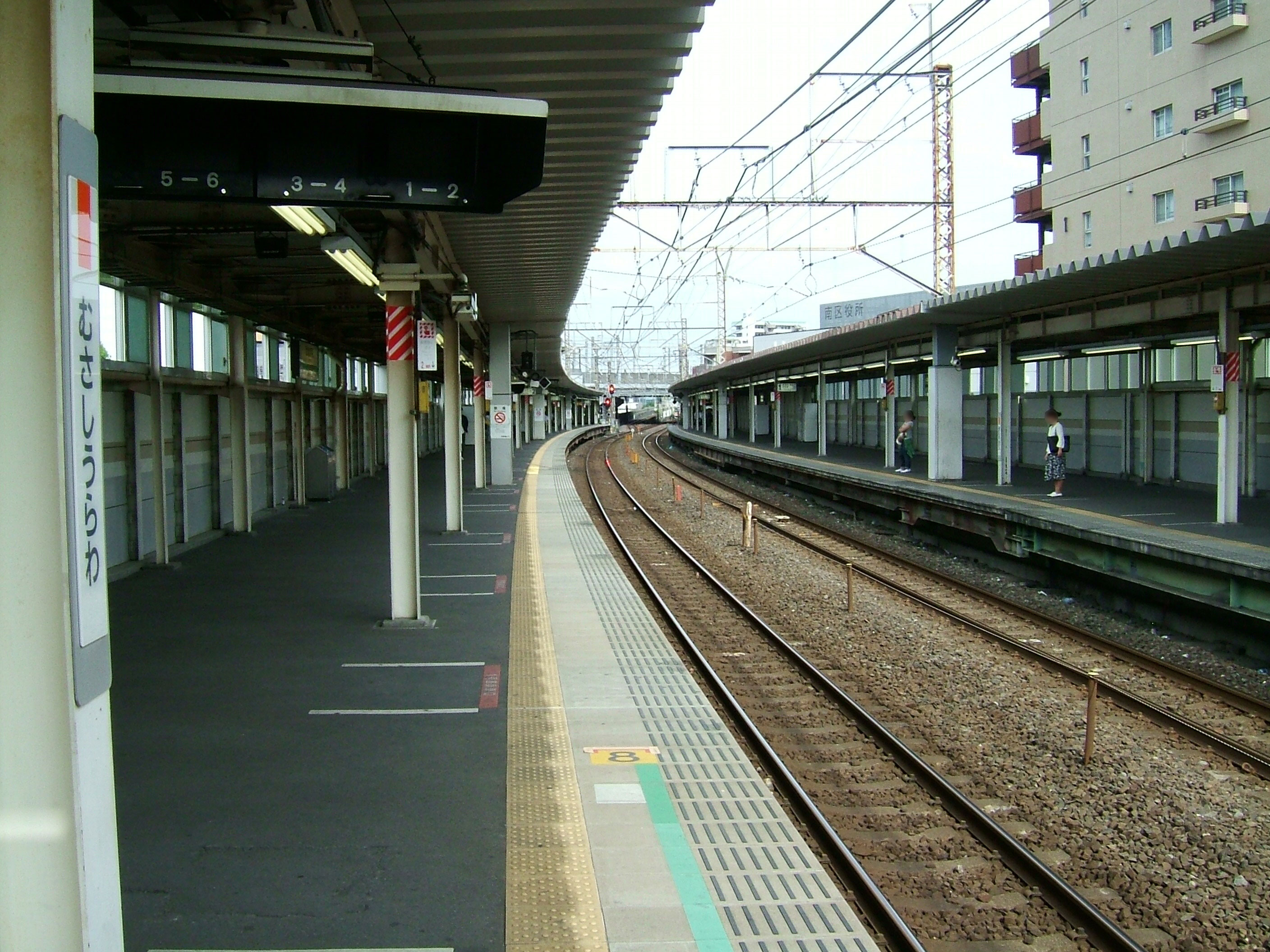
The Musashino Line platforms in June 2008

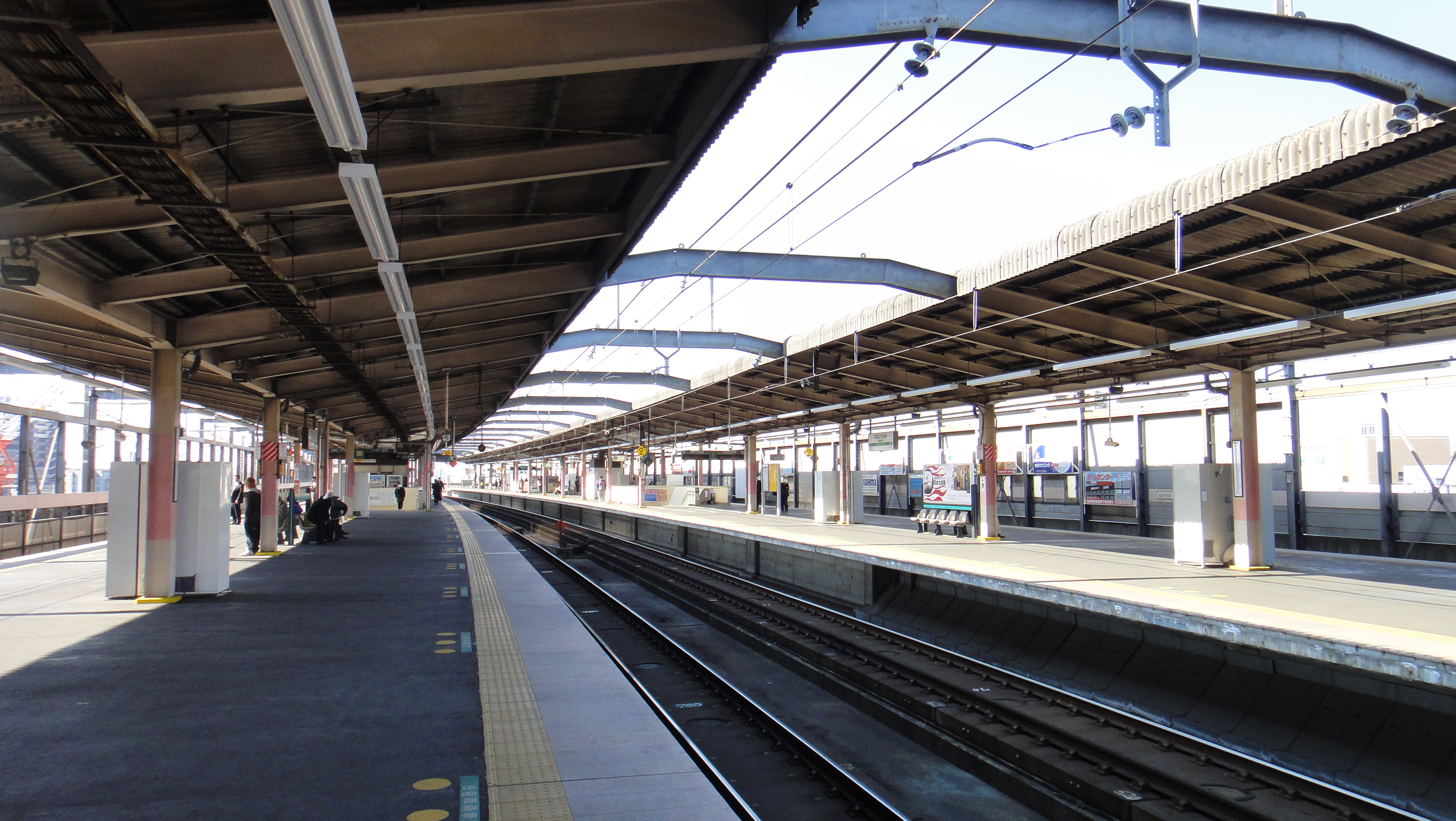
The Saikyō Line platforms in April 2011

1	Musashino Line	for Shim-Matsudo, Nishi-Funabashi, Tokyo, and Kaihimmakuhari
2	Musashino Line	for Kita-Asaka, Higashi-Tokorozawa, Nishi-Kokubunji, and Fuchūhommachi
3/4	Saikyō Line	for Akabane, Ikebukuro, Shinjuku, Shibuya, Ōsaki; Rinkai Line through service for Shin-Kiba
5/6	Saikyō Line	for Ōmiya and Kawagoe

== History ==
The station opened on 30 September 1985.

== Passenger statistics ==
In fiscal 2019, the station was used by an average of 53,992 passengers daily (boarding passengers only). The passenger figures for previous years are as shown below.

Fiscal year	Daily average
2000	32,280
2005	39,847
2010	45,978
2015	50,407

== Surrounding area ==
- Saitama Minami-ku Ward Office
- Lotte Urawa Factory
- Lotte Urawa Baseball Ground
- Tokyo Yakult Swallows Toda Baseball Ground

== See also ==
- List of railway stations in Japan
