= Seya =

Seya may refer to:

== Places ==
- Seya-ku, Yokohama, a ward of the city of Yokohama, Kanagawa Prefecture, Japan
- Seya Station, a railway station in Yokohama, Kanagawa Prefecture, Japan

== Film ==
- Seya (film), a 2018 film

== Music ==
- Seya (album), a 2009 album by Oumou Sangaré
- Seya, a 2023 single by GIMS
