= Asahi-ku =

Asahi-ku (旭区) may refer to one of the following city wards in Japan:

- Asahi-ku, Osaka
- Asahi-ku, Yokohama
