= Kibōgaoka Station =

Railway station in Yokohama, Japan

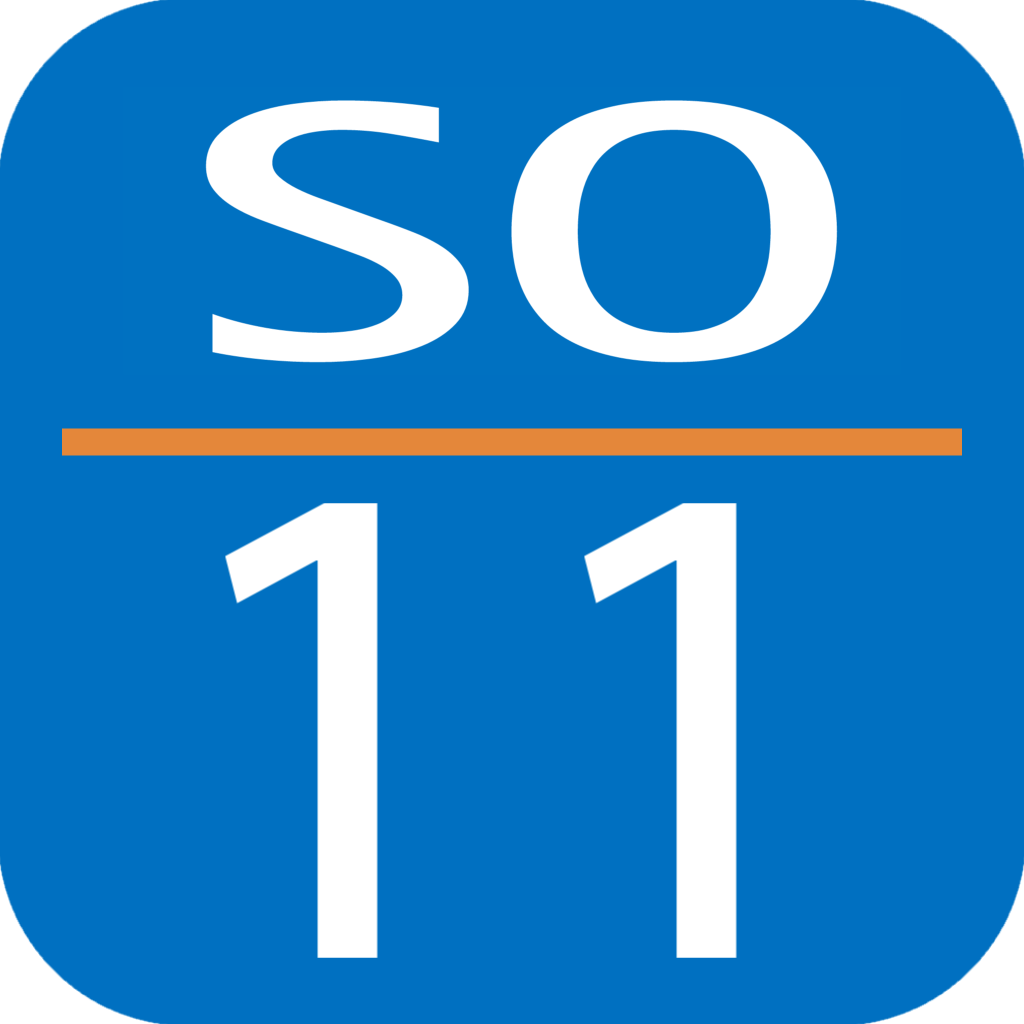
Kibōgaoka Station 希望ヶ丘駅

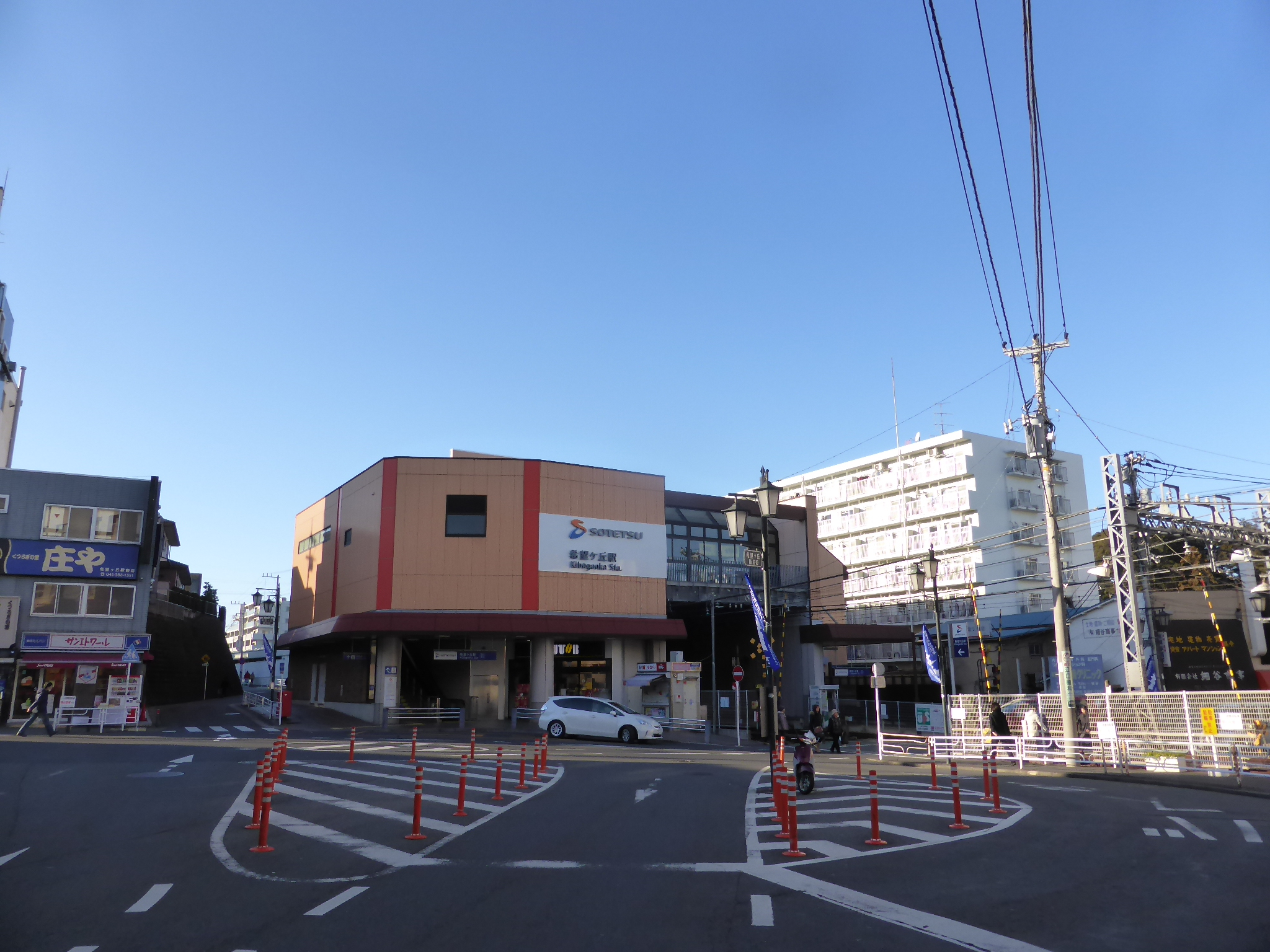
- The south entrance, January 2015

General information
- Location: Kibōgaoka, Asahi-ku, Yokohama-shi, Kanagawa-ken 241-0825; Japan
- Coordinates: 35.4604078°N 139.514308°E
- Operator: Sagami Railway
- Line: Sotetsu Main Line
- Distance: 12.2 km from Yokohama
- Platforms: 2 side platforms
- Tracks: 2

Construction
- Structure type: At-grade
- Accessible: Yes

Other information
- Station code: SO11
- Website: Official website

History
- Opened: 26 March 1948

Passengers
- 2019: 34,404 daily

Services
Preceding station	Sagami Railway	Following station
Mitsukyō towards Ebina	Sōtetsu Main Line Commuter Express Rapid Local	Futamata-gawa towards Yokohama
Mitsukyō towards Ebina	Sōtetsu–JR Link Line Local	Futamata-gawa towards Shinjuku
Location
- Location within Kanagawa Prefecture Location within Japan

Kibōgaoka Station (希望ヶ丘駅, Kibōgaoka-eki) is a passenger railway station located in Asahi-ku, Yokohama, Japan, operated by the private railway operator Sagami Railway (Sotetsu).

== Lines ==
Kibōgaoka Station is served by the Sagami Railway Main Line, and lies 12.2 kilometers from the starting point of the line at Yokohama Station.

== Station layout ==
The station consists of two opposed side platforms serving two tracks. The station building is elevated and located above the platforms and tracks.

=== Platforms ===
1	■ Sōtetsu Main Line	for Yamato and Ebina
2	■ Sōtetsu Main Line	for Futamata-gawa, Nishiya, and Yokohama; Sōtetsu Shin-Yokohama Line for Hazawa yokohama-kokudai and Shin-Yokohama; Sōtetsu-JR Link Line for Shinjuku and Kawagoe; Tōkyū Shin-Yokohama Line for Hiyoshi; Tōkyū Tōyoko Line for Shibuya; Tokyo Metro Fukutoshin Line for Wakōshi; Tōbu Tōjō Line for Kawagoeshi and Ogawamachi; Tōkyū Meguro Line for Meguro; Toei Mita Line for Nishi-takashimadaira; Tokyo Metro Namboku Line for Akabane-iwabuchi; Saitama Rapid Railway Line for Urawa-misono

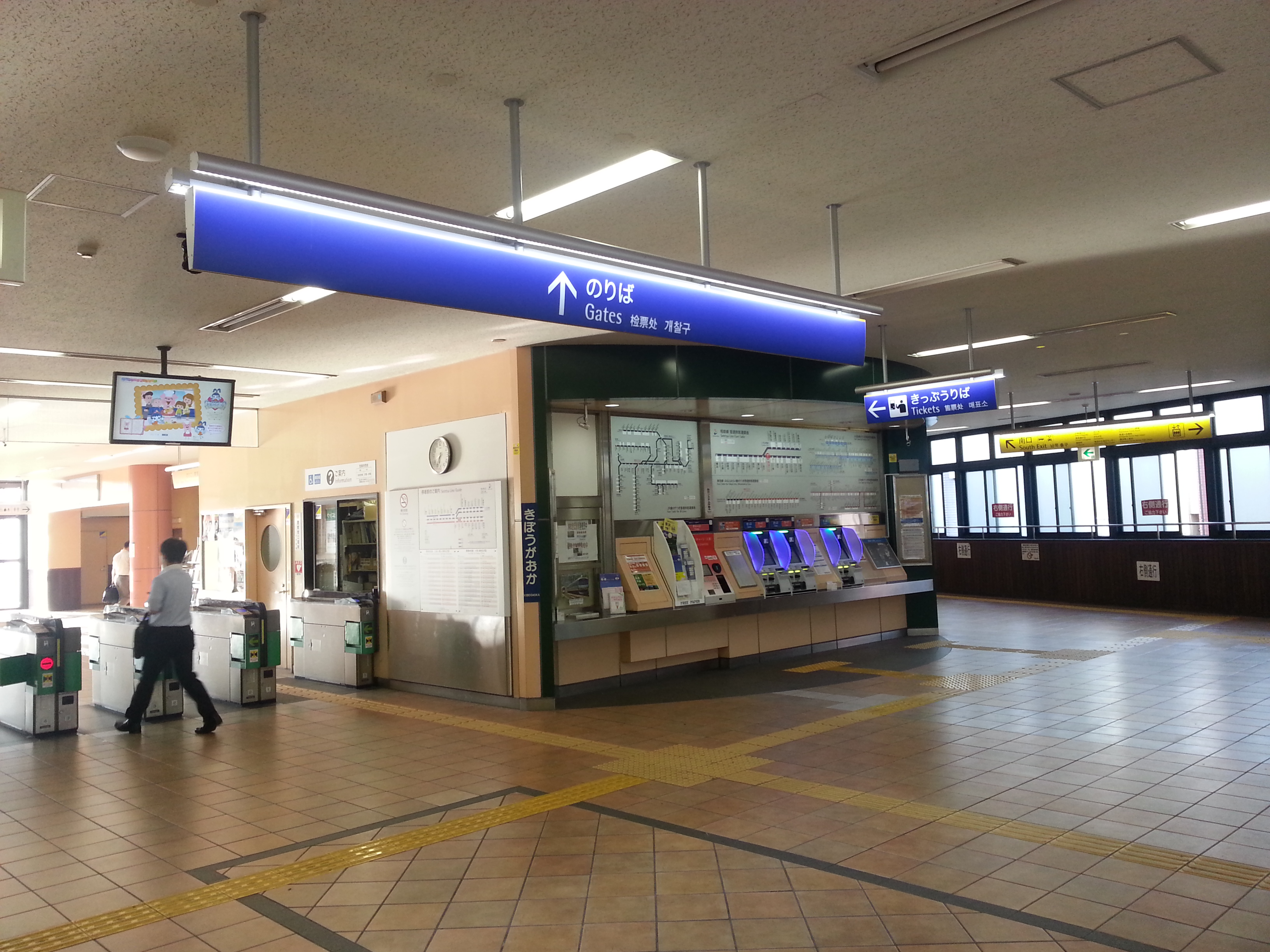
The station concourse, September 2013

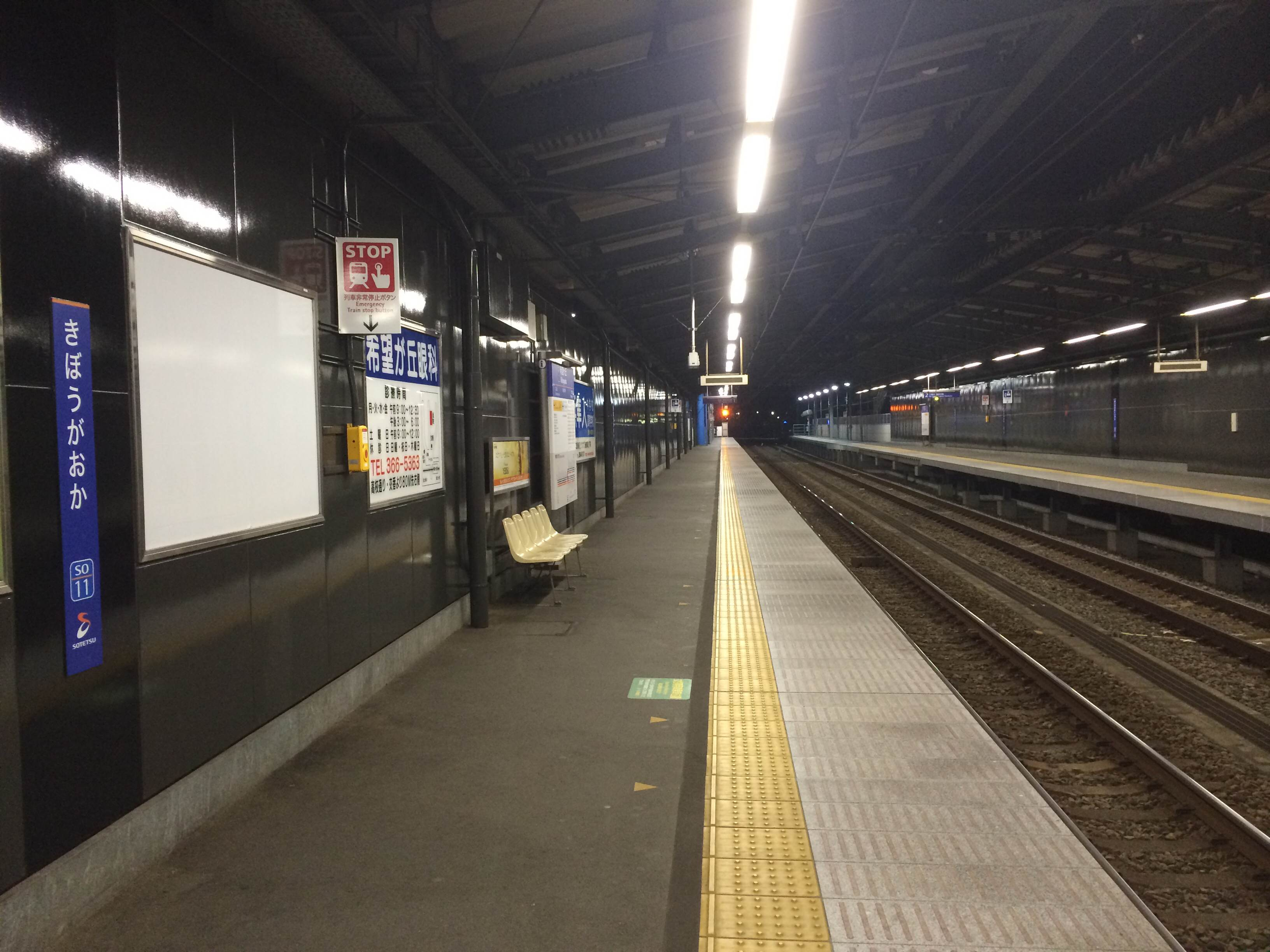
Platform 1, December 2014

== History ==
Kibōgaoka Station opened on 26 March 1948.

Through service with the Sōtetsu Shin-Yokohama Line to Hazawa yokohama-kokudai and the Sōtetsu-JR Link Line commenced on 30 November 2019. Through service via the Sōtetsu Shin-Yokohama Line to Shin-Yokohama and the Tokyu Shin-Yokohama Line commenced on 18 March 2023.

== Passenger statistics ==
In fiscal 2019, the station was used by an average of 34,404 passengers daily.

The passenger figures for previous years are as shown below.

Fiscal year	daily average
2005	33,302
2010	34,735
2015	34,916

== Surrounding area ==
- Futamagawa River

== See also ==
- List of railway stations in Japan
