= Tennōchō Station =

Railway station in Yokohama, Japan

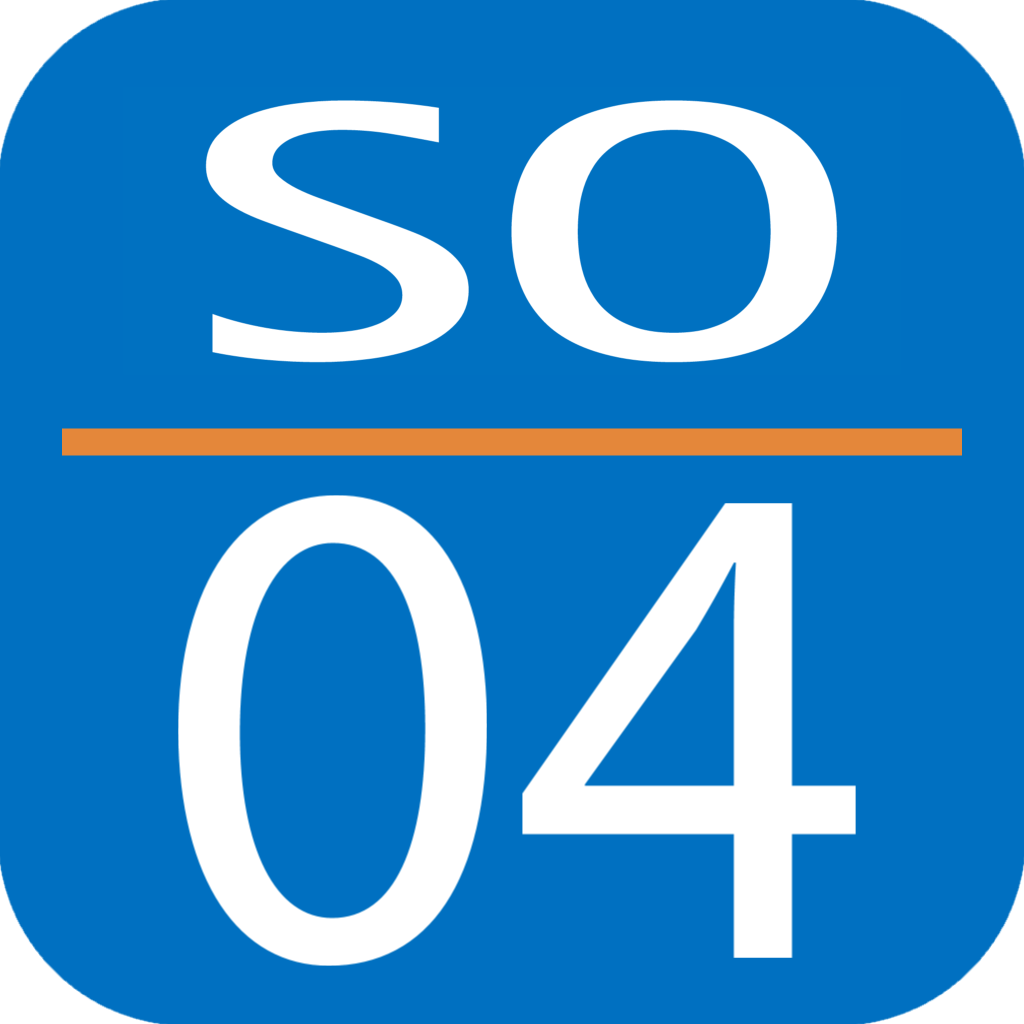
Tennōchō Station 天王町駅

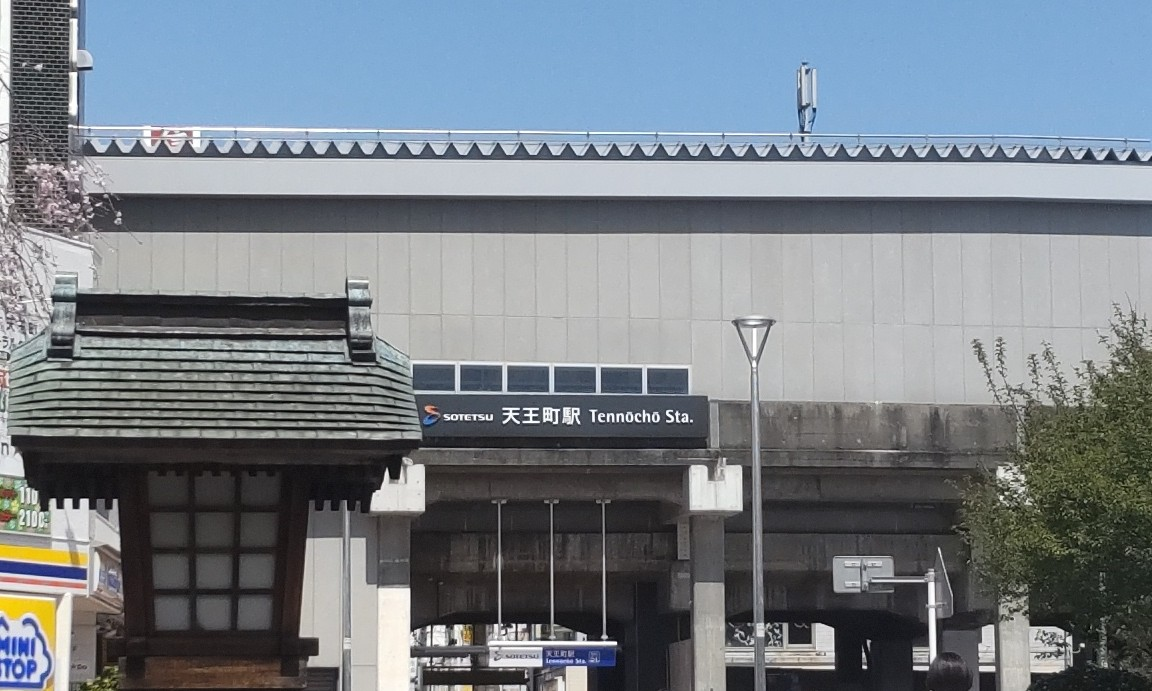
- South Exit in 2022

General information
- Location: 2-chome, Tennōchō 45-5, Hodogaya-ku, Yokohama-shi, Kanagawa-ken 240-0003; Japan
- Coordinates: 35.453936°N 139.602596°E
- Operator: Sagami Railway
- Line: Sotetsu Main Line
- Distance: 2.4 km from Yokohama
- Platforms: 2 side platforms

Other information
- Station code: SO04
- Website: Official website

History
- Opened: September 10, 1930

Passengers
- 2019: 27,312 daily

Services
Preceding station	Sagami Railway	Following station
Hoshikawa towards Ebina	Sōtetsu Main Line Local	Nishi-Yokohama towards Yokohama
Location
- Location within Kanagawa Prefecture Location within Japan

Tennōchō Station (天王町駅, Tennōchō-eki) is a passenger railway station located in Hodogaya-ku, Yokohama, Japan, operated by the private railway operator Sagami Railway (Sotetsu).

== Lines ==
Tennōchō Station is served by the Sagami Railway Main Line, and lies 2.4 kilometers from the starting point of the line at Yokohama Station.

== Station layout ==
The station consists of two elevated side platforms with the station building underneath.

=== Platforms ===
1	■ Sagami Line	for Futamata-gawa • Yamato • Ebina • Izumino Line to Shonandai
2	■ Sagami Line	for Yokohama

== History ==
Tennōchō Station was opened on September 10, 1930. The current elevated station building was completed on March 27, 1968.

== Passenger statistics ==
In fiscal 2019, the station was used by an average of 27,312 passengers daily.

The passenger figures for previous years are as shown below.

Fiscal year	daily average
2005	29,773
2010	27,606
2015	27,413

== Surrounding area ==
- Yokohama Business Park
- Kofukuji Matsubara Shopping Street

== See also ==
- List of railway stations in Japan
