= Sōtetsu Main Line =

Railway line in Kanagawa Prefecture, Japan

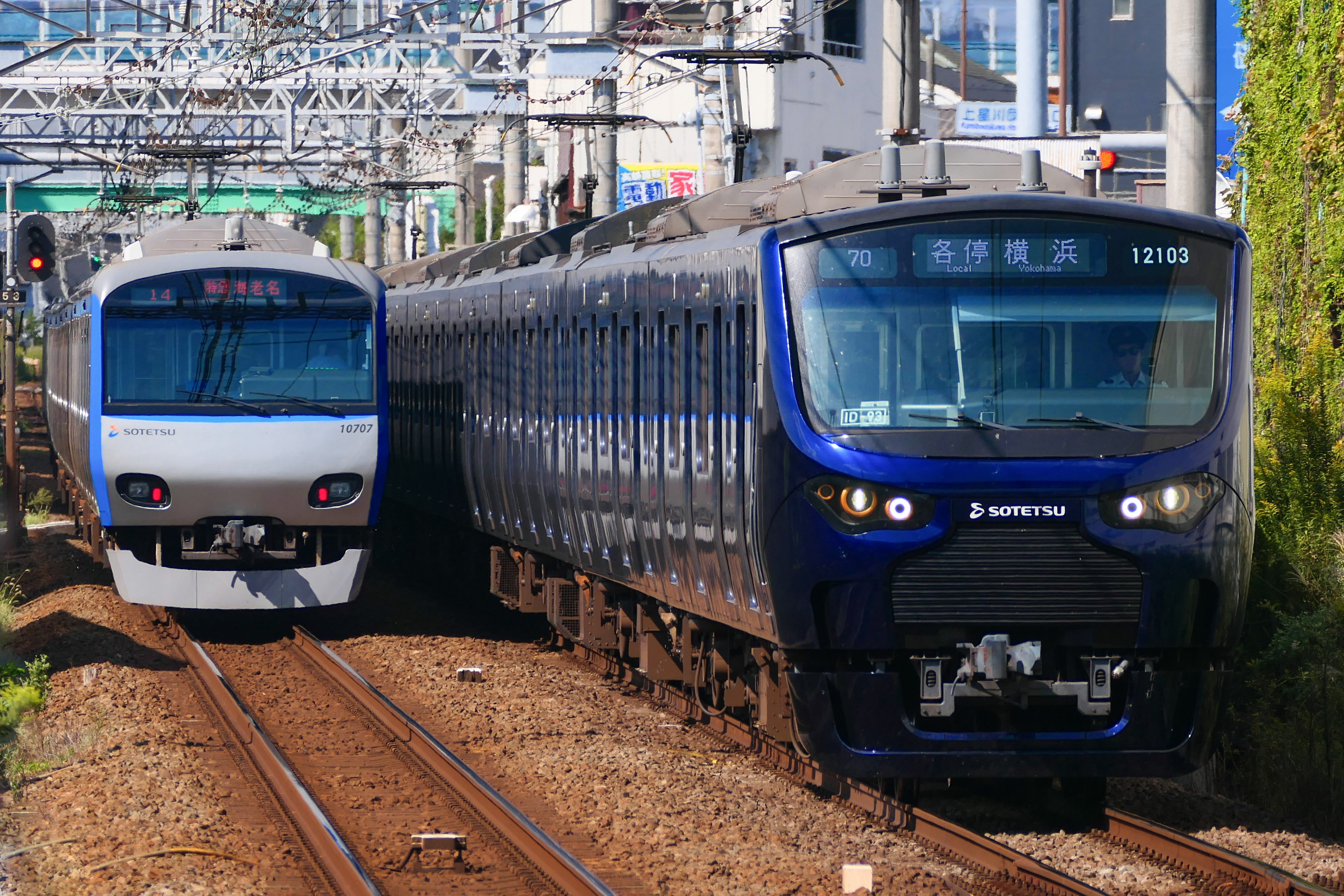
- A 10000 series EMU (left) and 12000 series EMU (right) in October 2024

Overview
- Native name: 相鉄本線
- Owner: Sagami Railway (Sotetsu)
- Locale: Kanagawa Prefecture
- Termini: Yokohama; Ebina
- Stations: 18

Service
- Type: Commuter rail
- Depot: Kashiwadai Station
- Daily ridership: 566,657 (FY2010)

History
- Opened: 12 May 1926; 100 years ago

Technical
- Line length: 24.6 km (15.3 mi)
- Track gauge: 1,067 mm (3 ft 6 in)
- Electrification: 1,500 V DC overhead catenary
- Operating speed: 100 km/h (60 mph)

The Sōtetsu Main Line (相鉄本線, Sōtetsu-honsen) is a railway line in Kanagawa Prefecture, Japan, operated by the private railway operator Sagami Railway (Sotetsu). It connects Yokohama and Ebina.

== Services ==
Services on the Main Line are divided into four categories. Some trains travel along the Izumino Line west of Futamata-gawa to Shōnandai.

- Local (各停) - services stop at all stations. They do not travel from end to end; services are split at Futamata-gawa, with trains running between Yokohama and Futamata-gawa and between Futamata-gawa and either Ebina or Shōnandai.
- Rapid (快速) - services stop between Yokohama and Futamata-gawa at Hoshikawa, Nishiya and Tsurugamine, and at all stations from Futamata-gawa to either Ebina or Shōnandai.
- Commuter Express (通勤急行 or 通急) - services stop between Yokohama and Futamata-gawa at Nishiya and Tsurugamine, and at all stations from Futamata-gawa to either Ebina or Shōnandai.
- Commuter Limited Express (通勤特急 or 通特) services between Shōnandai and Shin-yokohama and continue through running on either the Tokyu Toyoko Line or Meguro Line and their subsequent through services.
- Limited Express (特急) services stop between Yokohama and Ebina at Nishiya, Futamata-gawa and Yamato.

== Stations ==
- All stations are located in Kanagawa Prefecture.
- Local trains stop at all stations; For all other train types, trains stop at stations marked ●, and pass stations marked | and ↑.
- Commuter Limited Express services stop at stations marked ▲.

No.	Station	Japanese	Distance (km)		Rapid	Comm. Exp.	Ltd. Exp. Comm. Ltd. Exp.	Transfers	Location
No.	Station	Japanese	Between Stations	Total	Rapid	Comm. Exp.	Ltd. Exp. Comm. Ltd. Exp.	Transfers	Location
SO-01	Yokohama	横浜	0.0	0.0	●	●	●	Tōkaidō Line; Keihin–Tōhoku Line; Yokohama Line; Negishi Line; Yokosuka Line; Shōnan–Shinjuku Line; Tōyoko Line; Main Line; Blue Line; Minatomirai Line	Nishi-ku, Yokohama
SO-02	Hiranumabashi	平沼橋	0.9	0.9	|	↑	|		Nishi-ku, Yokohama
SO-03	Nishi-Yokohama	西横浜	0.9	1.8	|	↑	|		Nishi-ku, Yokohama
SO-04	Tennōchō	天王町	0.6	2.4	|	↑	|		Hodogaya-ku, Yokohama
SO-05	Hoshikawa	星川	0.9	3.3	●	↑	|		Hodogaya-ku, Yokohama
SO-06	Wadamachi	和田町	1.0	4.3	|	↑	|		Hodogaya-ku, Yokohama
SO-07	Kamihoshikawa	上星川	0.7	5.0	|	↑	|		Hodogaya-ku, Yokohama
Upbound through services					Sōtetsu Shin-Yokohama Line Sōtetsu–JR Direct Line from Hazawa yokohama-kokudai to Kawagoe Tōkyū Shin-yokohama Line from Shin-yokohama to Hiyoshi Meguro Line for Meguro Mita Line for Nishi-takashimadaira Namboku Line for Akabane-iwabuchi Saitama Railway Line for Urawa-misono Tōyoko Line for Shibuya Fukutoshin Line for Wakōshi Tojo Line for Ogawamachi				
SO-08	Nishiya	西谷	1.9	6.9	●	●	●	Sōtetsu Shin-Yokohama Line	Hodogaya-ku
SO-09	Tsurugamine	鶴ヶ峰	1.6	8.5	●	●	▲		Asahi-ku, Yokohama
SO-10	Futamatagawa	二俣川	2.0	10.5	●	●	●	Sōtetsu Izumino Line	Asahi-ku, Yokohama
Downbound through service					Sōtetsu Izumino Line for Shōnandai				
SO-11	Kibōgaoka	希望ヶ丘	1.7	12.2	●	●	|		Asahi-ku
SO-12	Mitsukyō	三ツ境	1.4	13.6	●	●	|		Seya-ku, Yokohama
SO-13	Seya	瀬谷	1.9	15.5	●	●	|		Seya-ku, Yokohama
SO-14	Yamato	大和	1.9	17.4	●	●	●	Enoshima Line	Yamato
SO-15	Sagami-Ōtsuka	相模大塚	1.9	19.3	●	●	|		Yamato
SO-16	Sagamino	さがみ野	1.2	20.5	●	●	|		Ebina
SO-17	Kashiwadai	かしわ台	1.3	21.8	●	●	|		Ebina
SO-18	Ebina	海老名	2.8	24.6	●	●	●	Odawara Line; Sagami Line	Ebina

== Rolling stock ==
=== Current ===
Sotetsu

- 8000 series (10 car sets, since December 1990)
- 9000 series (10 car sets, since January 1993)
- 10000 series (8/10 car sets, since February 2002)
- 11000 series (10 car sets, since June 2009)
- 12000 series (10 car sets, since 20 April 2019)
- 13000 series (8 car sets, since 30 March 2026)
- 20000/21000 series (10/8 car sets, respectively, since 11 February 2018)

JR East

- E233-7000 series (10 car sets, since 30 November 2019)

Tokyu

- Tokyu 3000 series (8 car sets, since 18 March 2023)
- Tokyu 5050-4000 series (10 car sets, since 18 March 2023)
- Tokyu 5080 series (8 car sets, since 18 March 2023)
- Tokyu 3020 series (8 car sets, since 26 September 2023)
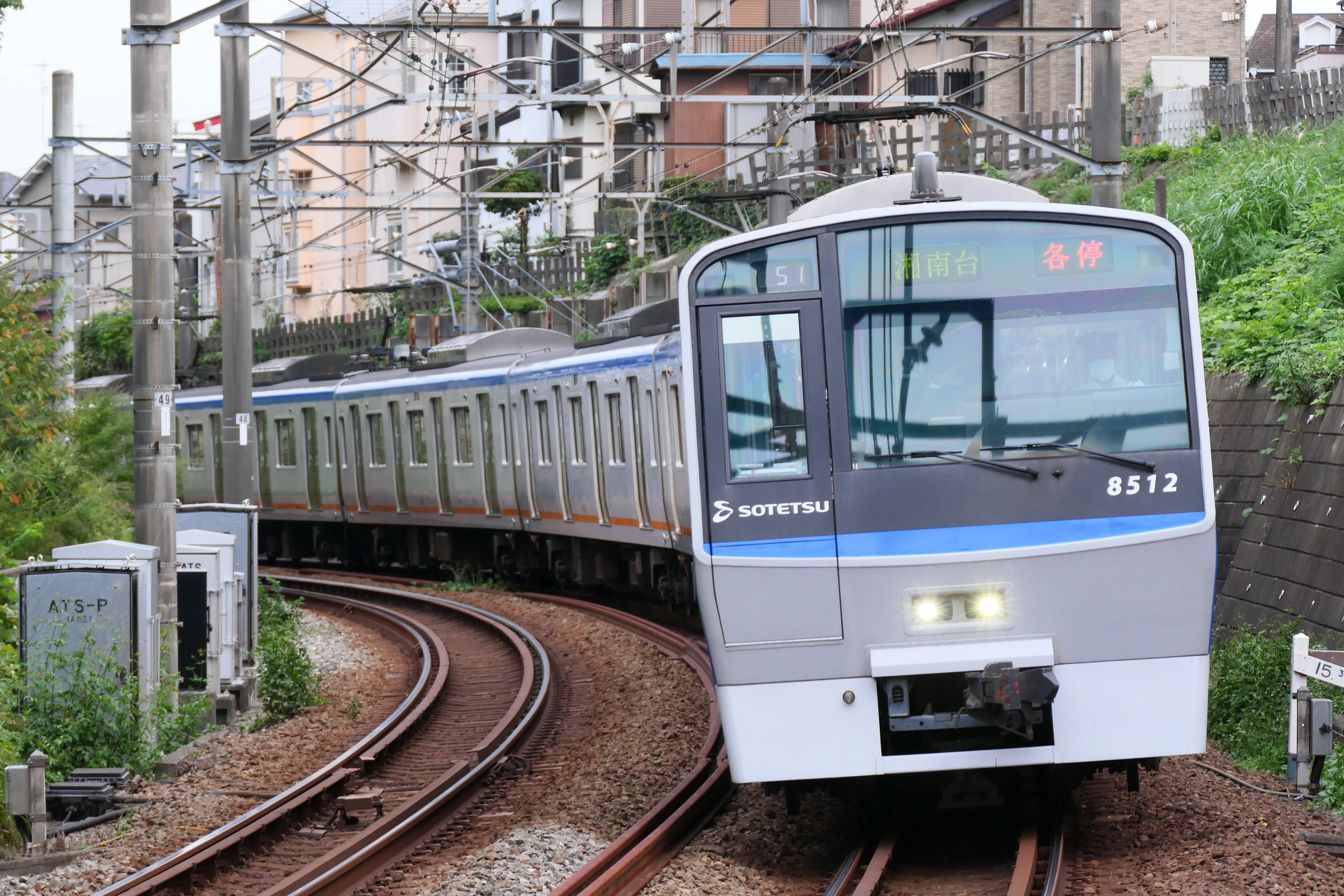
8000 series, revised livery

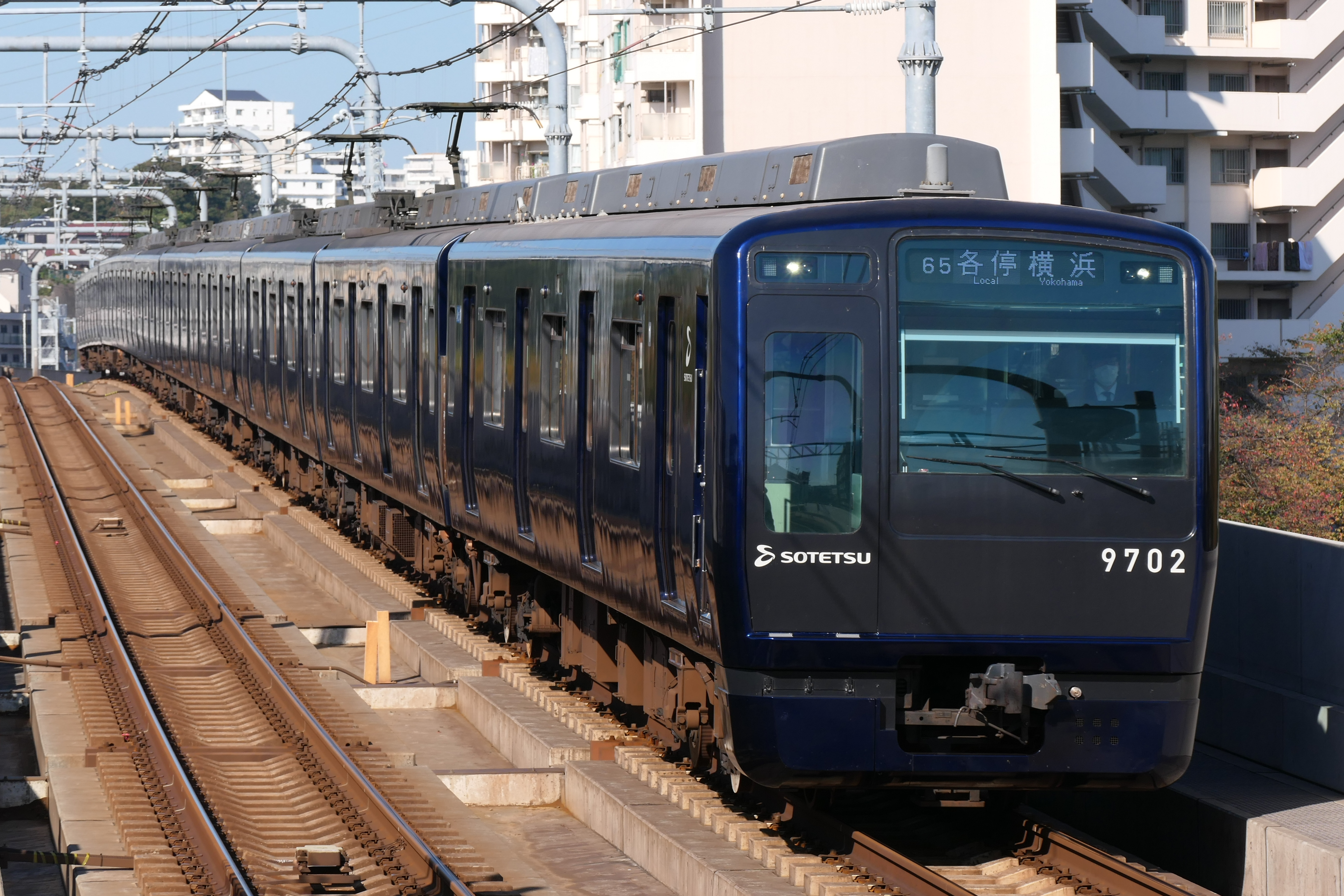
9000 series, Yokohama Navy Blue livery

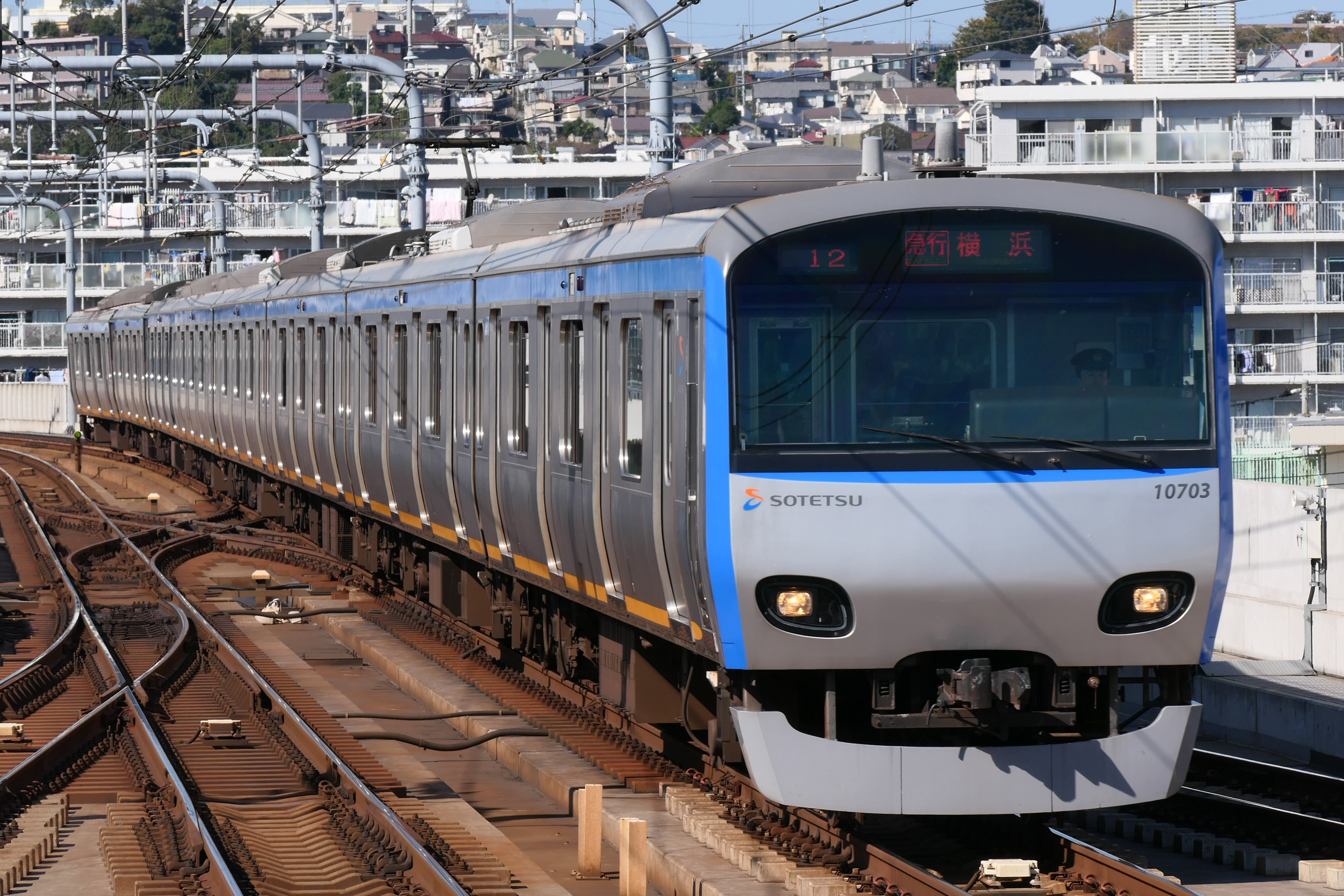
10000 series

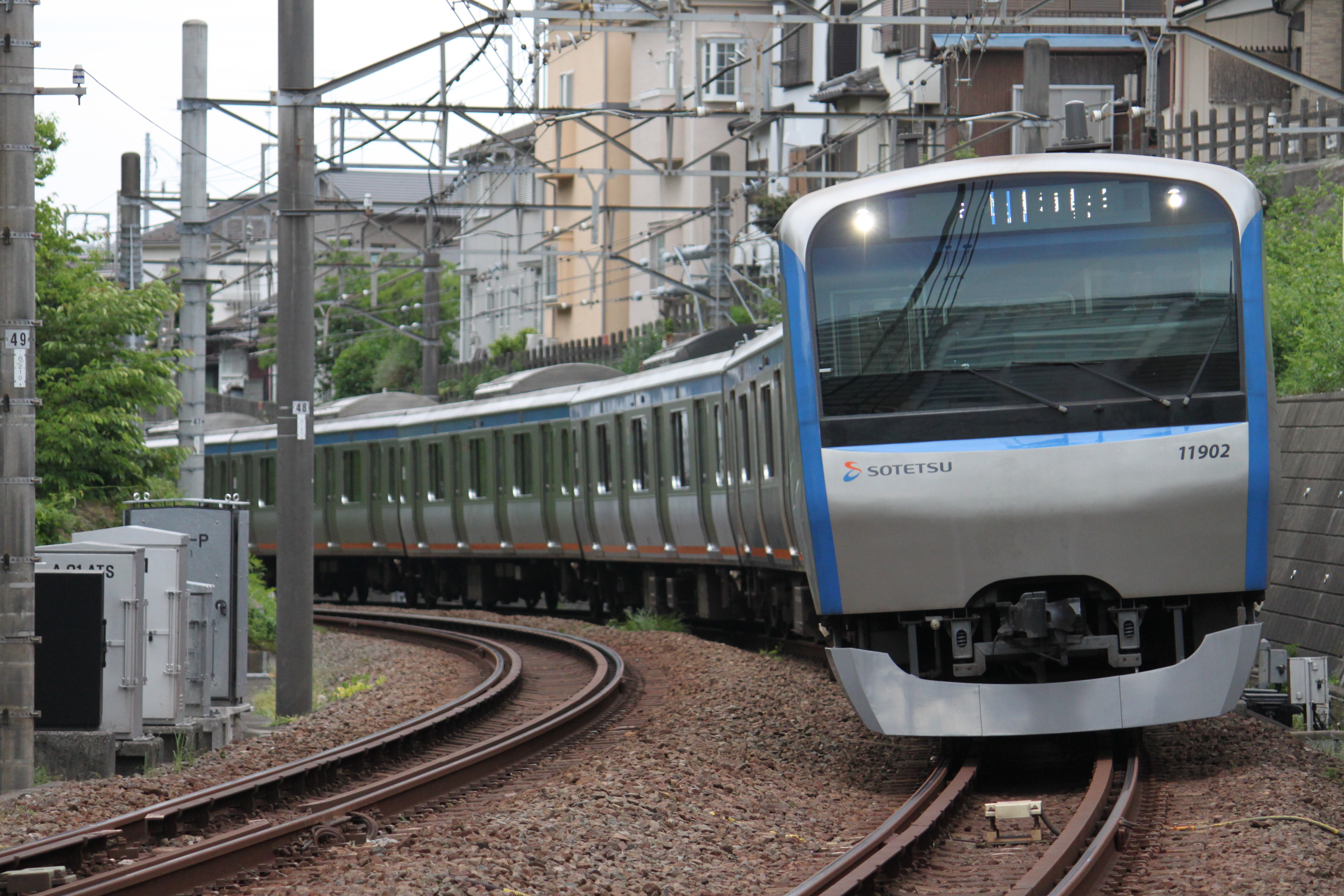
11000 series

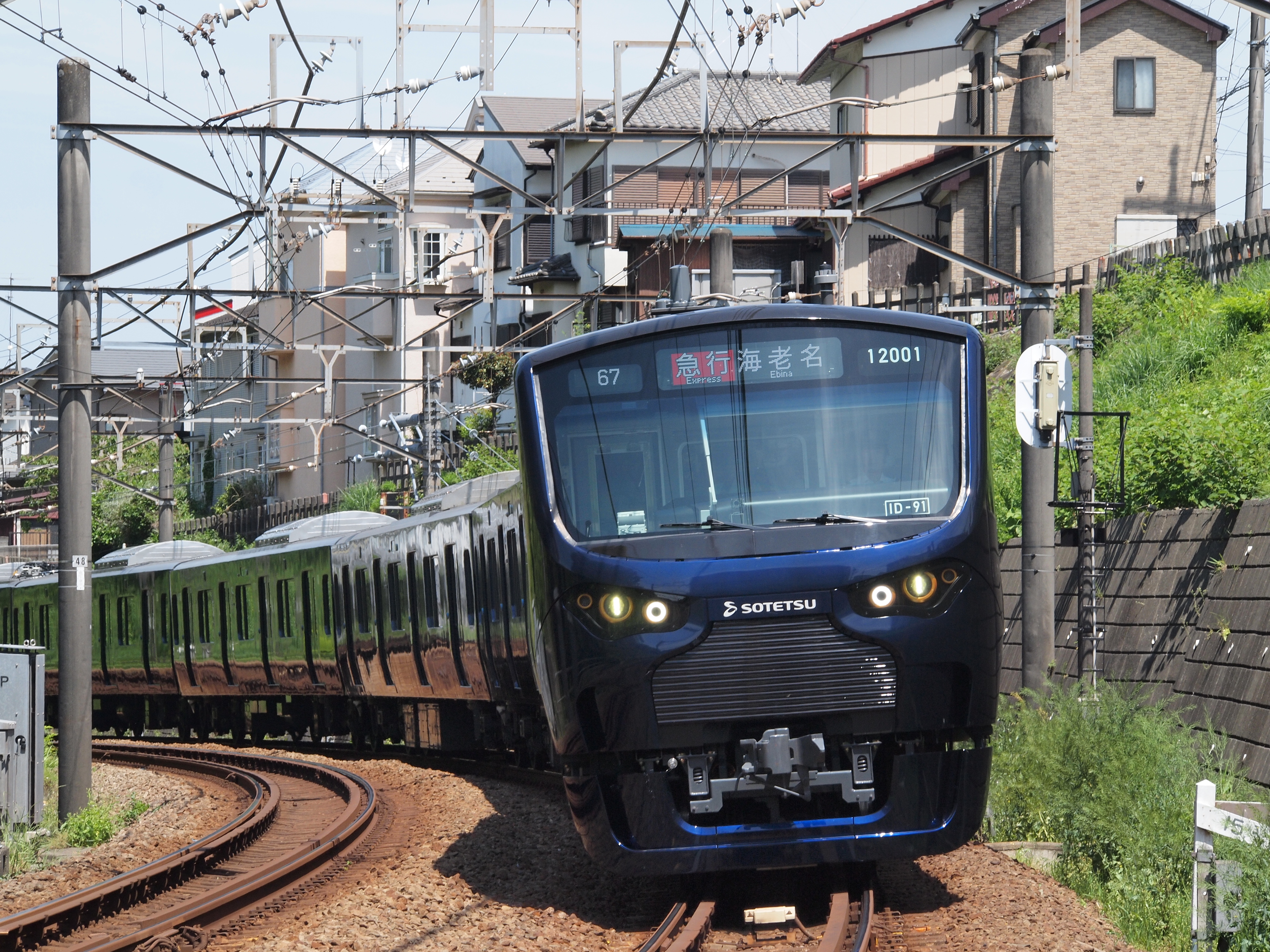
12000 series

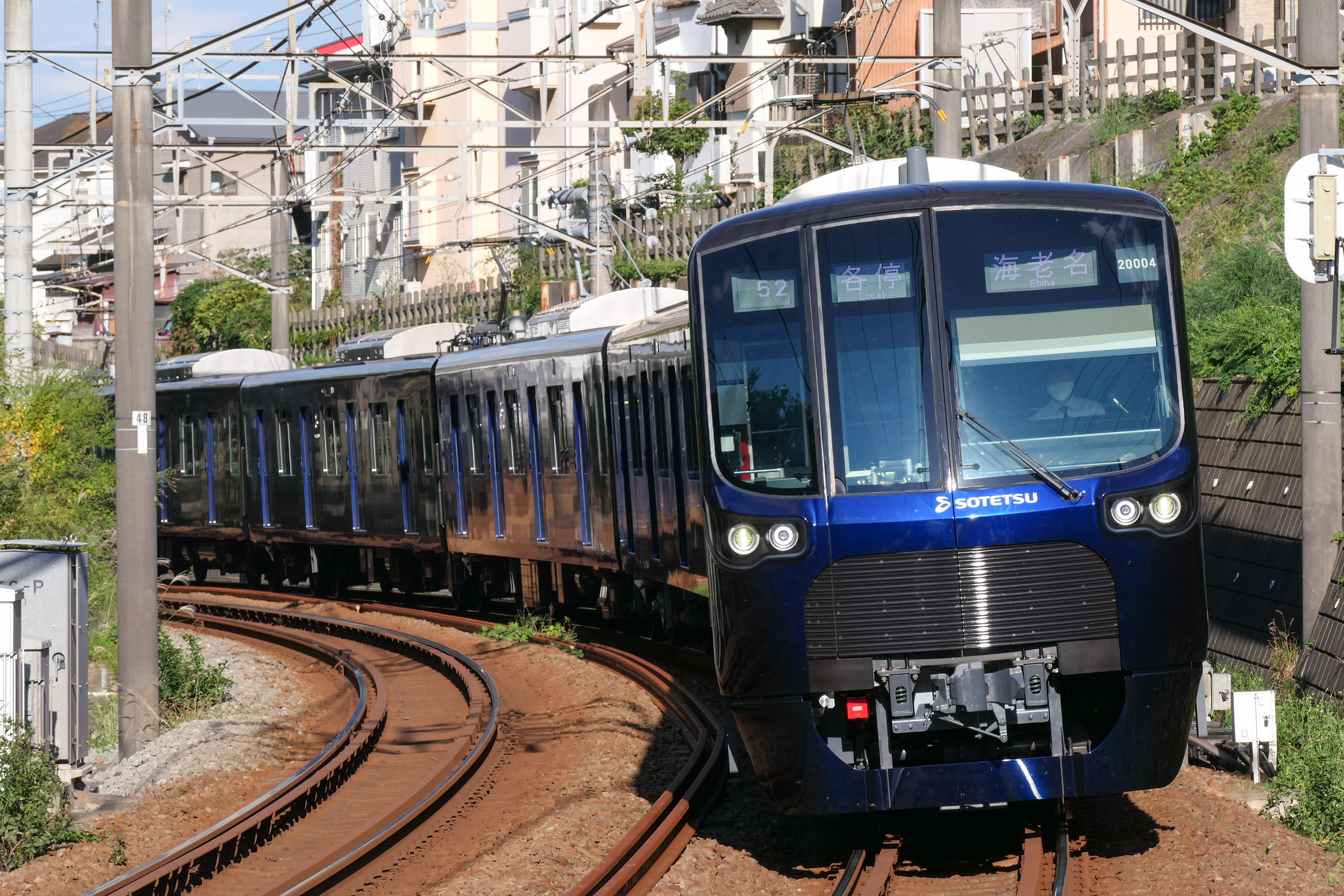
20000 series

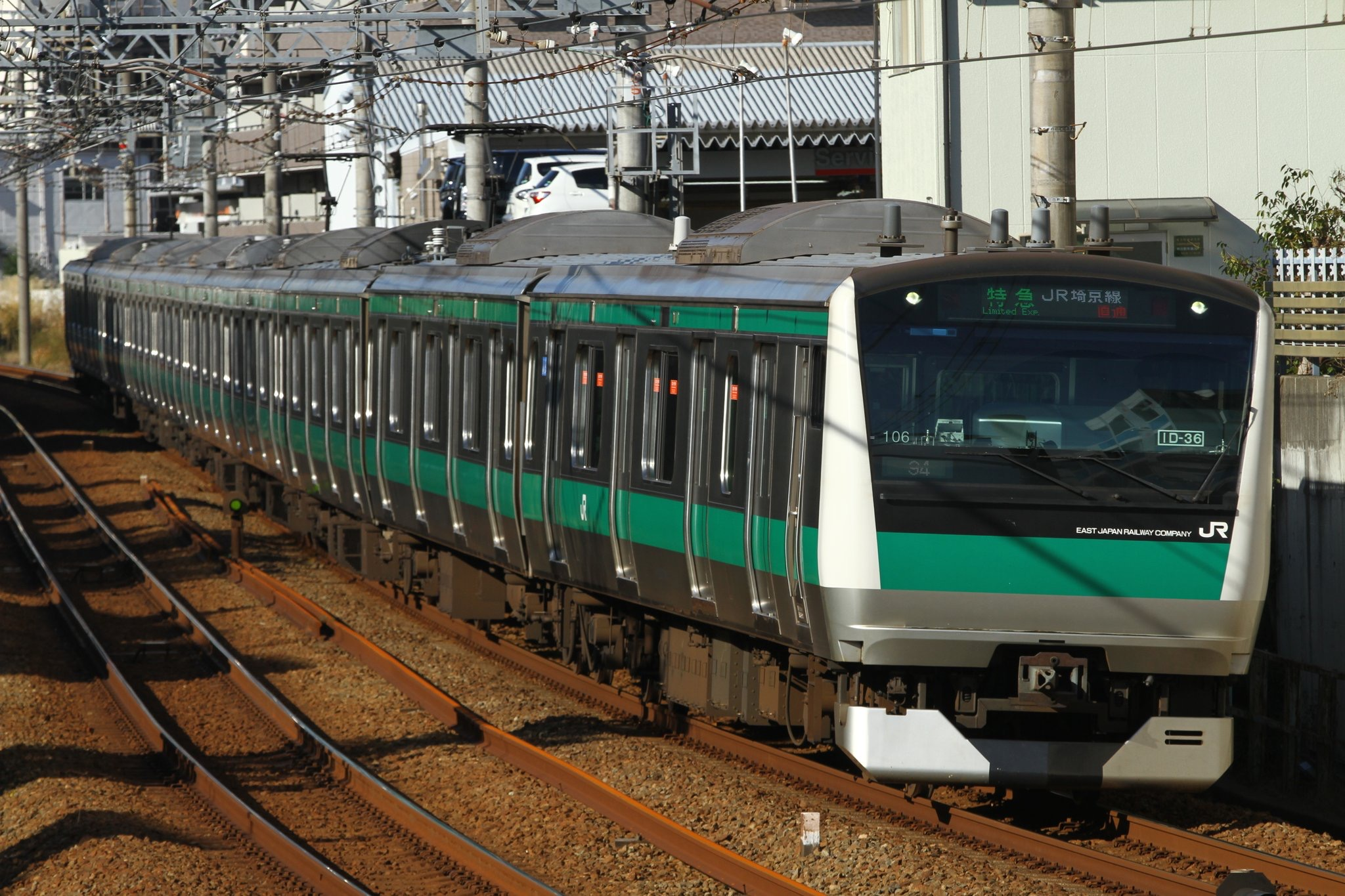
JR East E233-7000 series

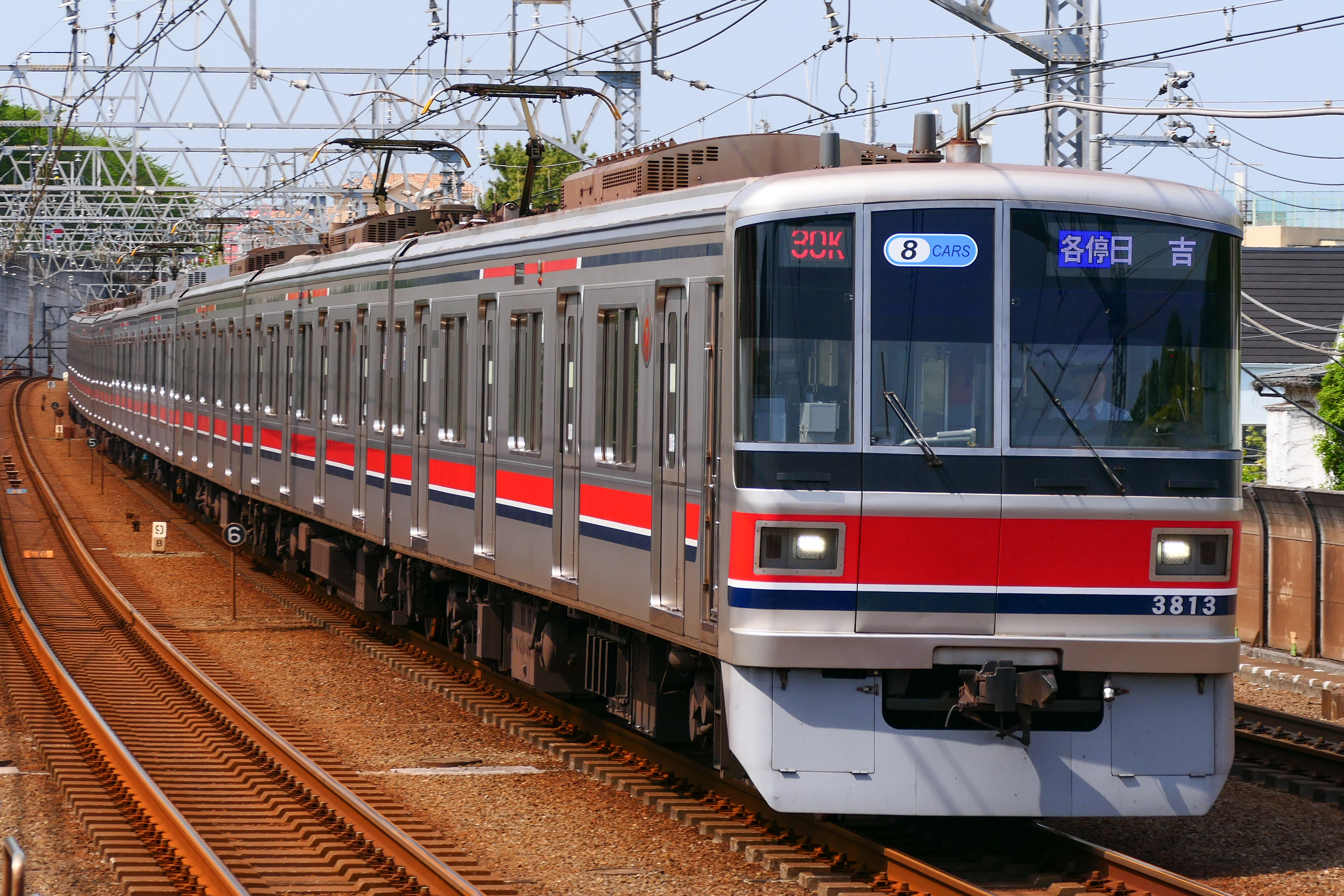
Tokyu 3000 series

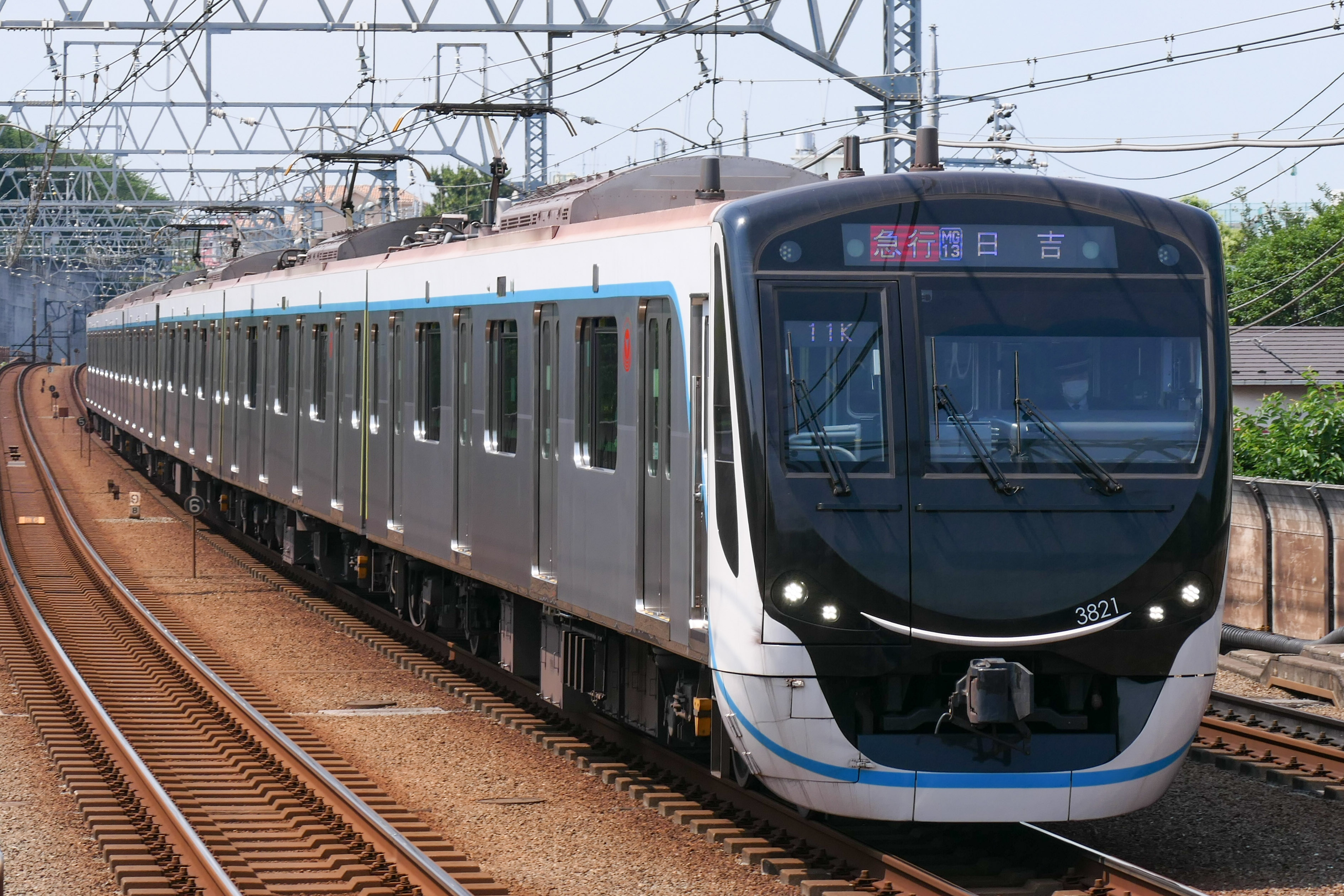
Tokyu 3020 series

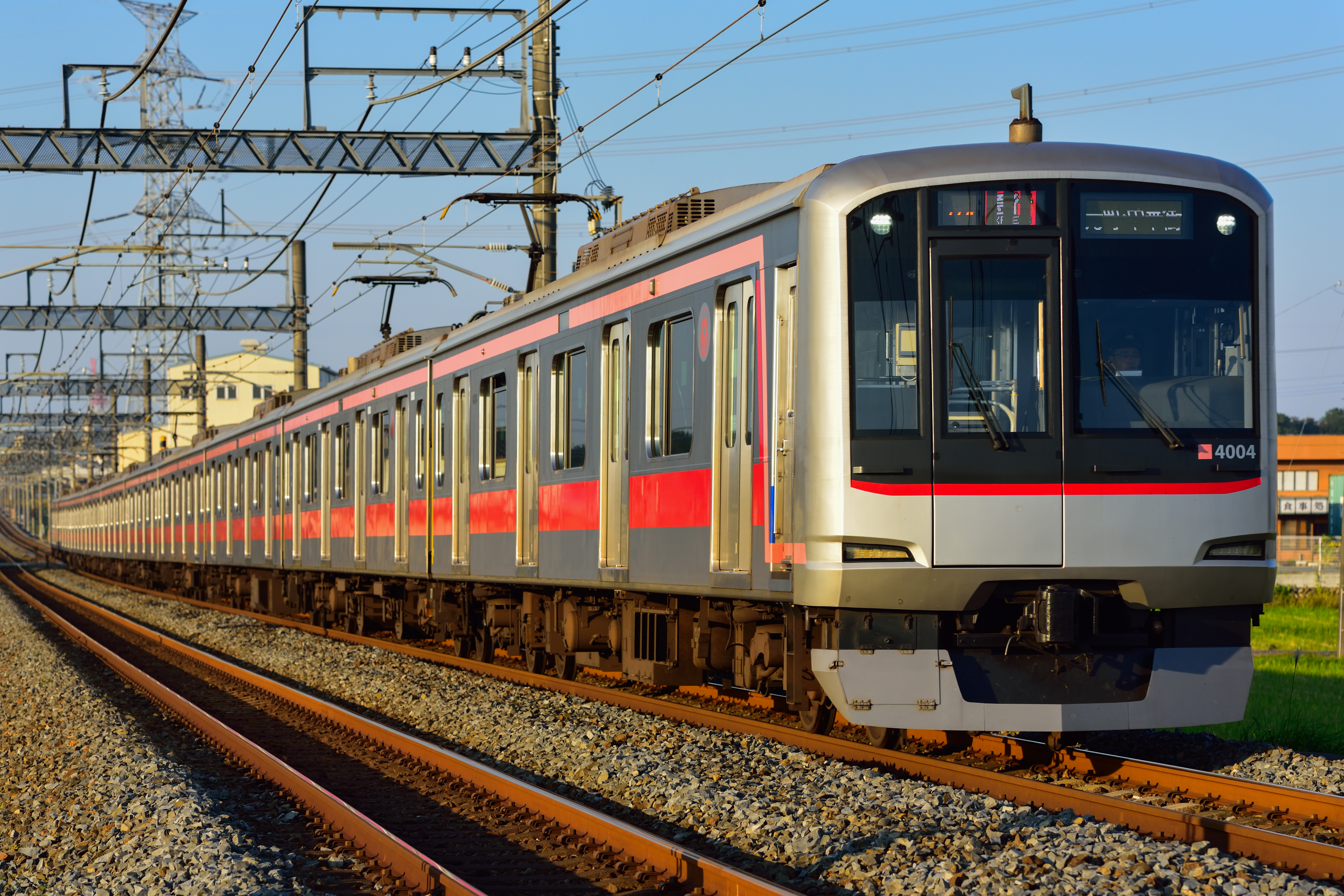
Tokyu 5050-4000 series

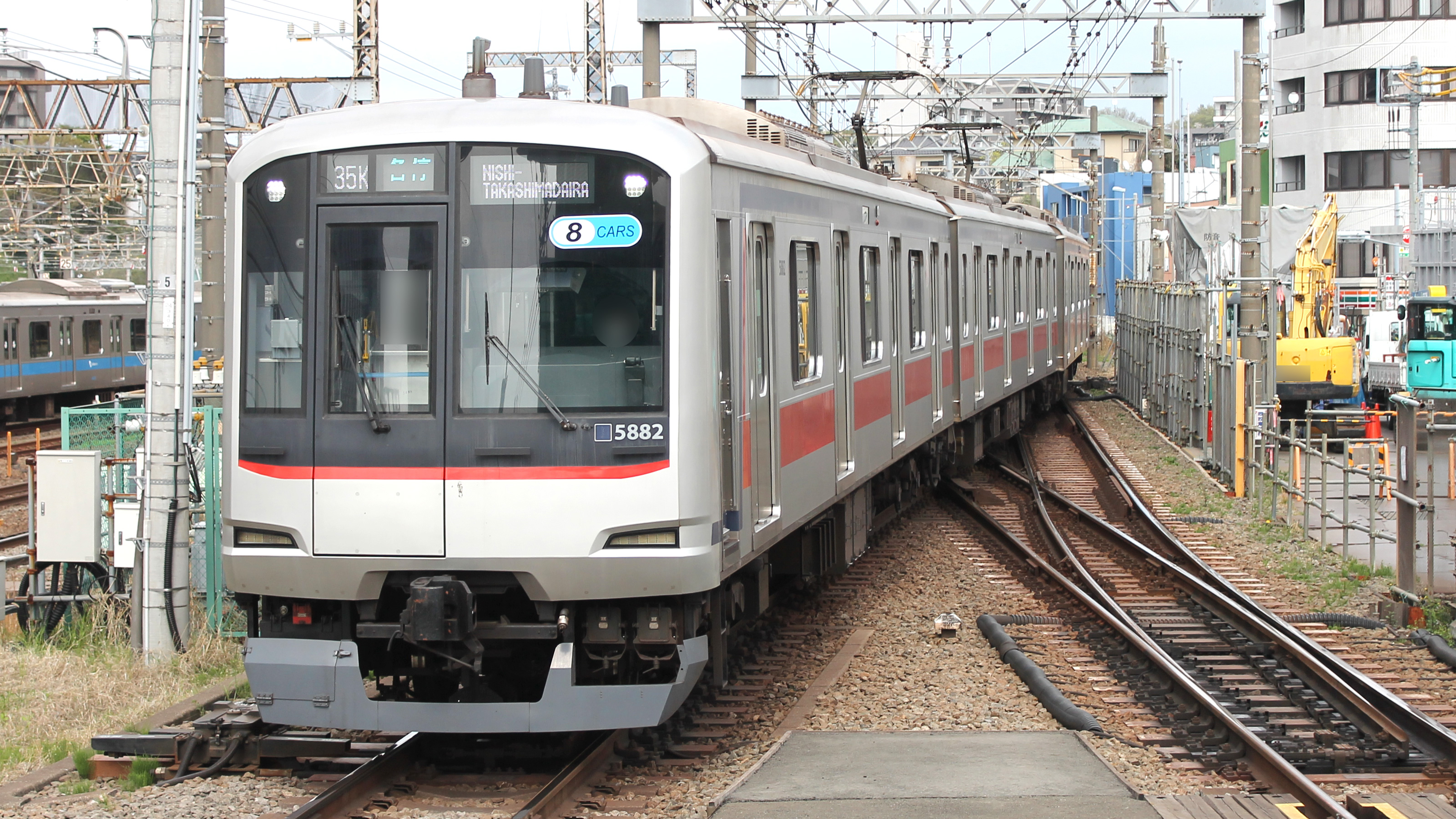
Tokyu 5080 series

=== Former ===
- 5000 series (from 1955 until 2009)
- 6000 series (from 1961 until 2005)
- 7000 series (from 1975 until 2020)
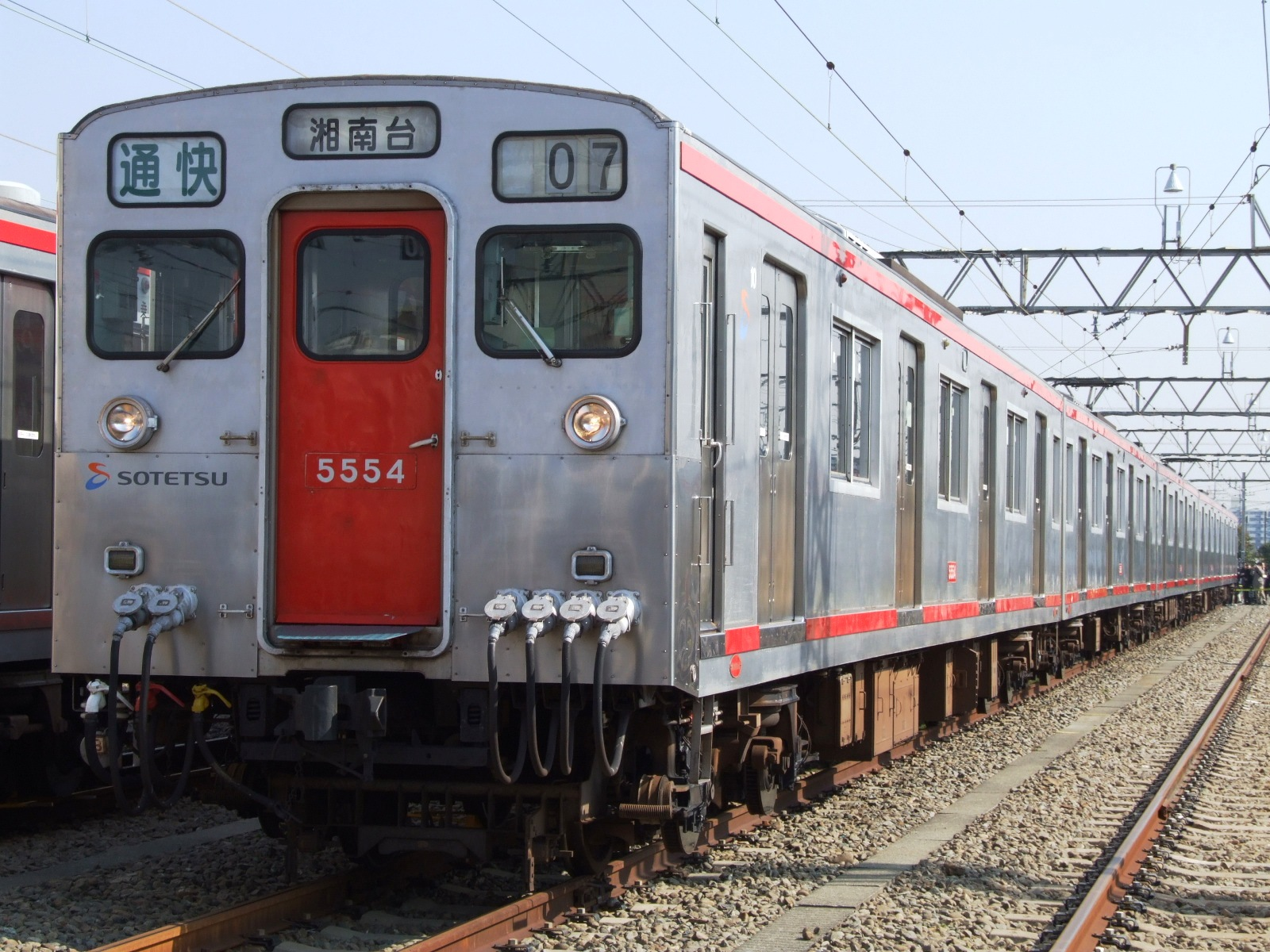
5000 series

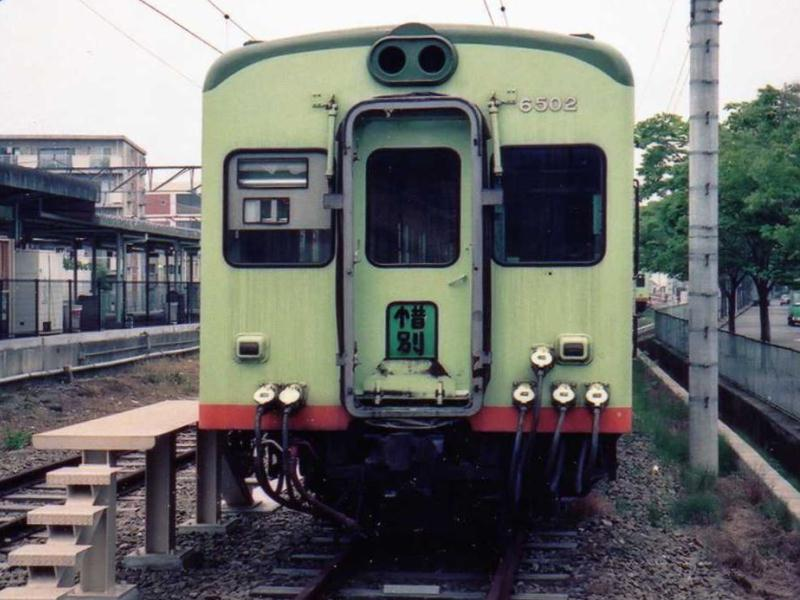
6000 series

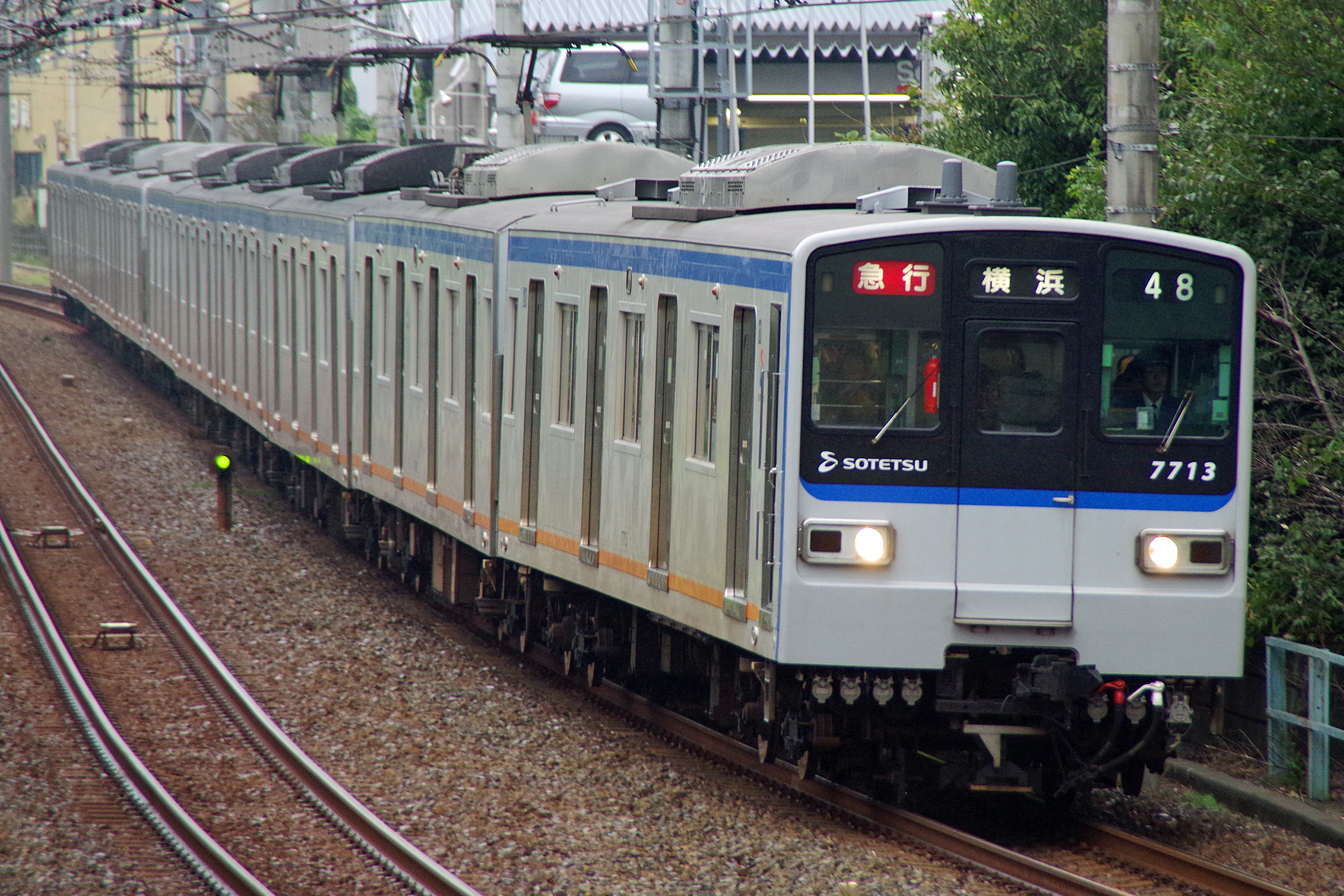
New 7000 series

=== Non-revenue-earning stock ===
- 2000 series
- ED10 electric locomotives

== History ==
The line opened on 12 May 1926 as the steam-operated Jinchu Railway (神中鉄道, Jinchū Tetsudō) between Futamata-gawa and Atsugi (on the present-day Sagami Line). The line was extended from Futamata-gawa to Yokohama in December 1933, and from the former station at Sagami-Kokubu (相模国分) (now closed) in November 1941.

The line became the Sagami Railway Jinchu Line (相模鉄道神中線) from 1 April 1943. However, when the line was commissioned to Tōkyū due to the financial difficulties of the Sagami Railway, it was renamed as the "Tōkyū Atsugi Line" (東急厚木線) until the end of the commission in 1947.

Work to electrify the line commenced in June 1942, with the entire line between Yokohama and Ebina electrified by 20 September 1944.

Work to double-track the line commenced in January 1957 between Yokohama and Nishi-Yokohama. The entire line was double-tracked by March 1974.

The first air-conditioned trains (4-car 6000 series EMUs) were introduced on the line on 3 July 1971.

10-car trains started operating on the line from 6 April 1981.

Station ticket barriers were modified to allow use of the Passnet magnetic farecard from 1 October 2000.

There was a short spur line which branched from Sagamino Station to the Naval Air Facility Atsugi air base. While the track remains in place up to the fence of the base, the line is no longer in use.

In order to improve safety and efficiency, a 2.8 km (1.7 mi) section around Tsurugamine Station is being transitioned to an underground structure. The underground track section and new station building is expected to be completed in 2034.

On a side note, what is known today as the Sagami Line had been constructed and owned by Sōtetsu, until 1944 when it was acquired by the government during World War II. After the war, the government and Sōtetsu never reached any agreement to return the line to Sōtetsu, and today it is run by JR East.

=== March 2023 timetable revision ===
The Sōtetsu Shin-yokohama Line connects Nishiya to Hazawa Yokohama-Kokudai, Shin-Yokohama and further to the Tōkyū Shin-yokohama Line. Through service to the Saikyō Line began on 30 November 2019 while services to the Tōkyū Shin-Yokohama Line began on 18 March 2023.

With the opening of this new line, Limited Express and Rapid services make a stop at Nishiya, which facilitates transfer between services to central Yokohama and the Tokyo Metropolis.

In addition, two new service types will be implemented. They are the Commuter Limited Express (通勤特急) and Commuter Express (通勤急行) services, which both operate through services from / to the Izumino Line. The former service will replace the current Express on the Izumino Line, and will make additional stops at Nishiya and Tsurugamine. The latter service is a brand new service, making stops at all stations west of Nishiya.
