= Mitsukyō Station =

Railway station in Yokohama, Japan

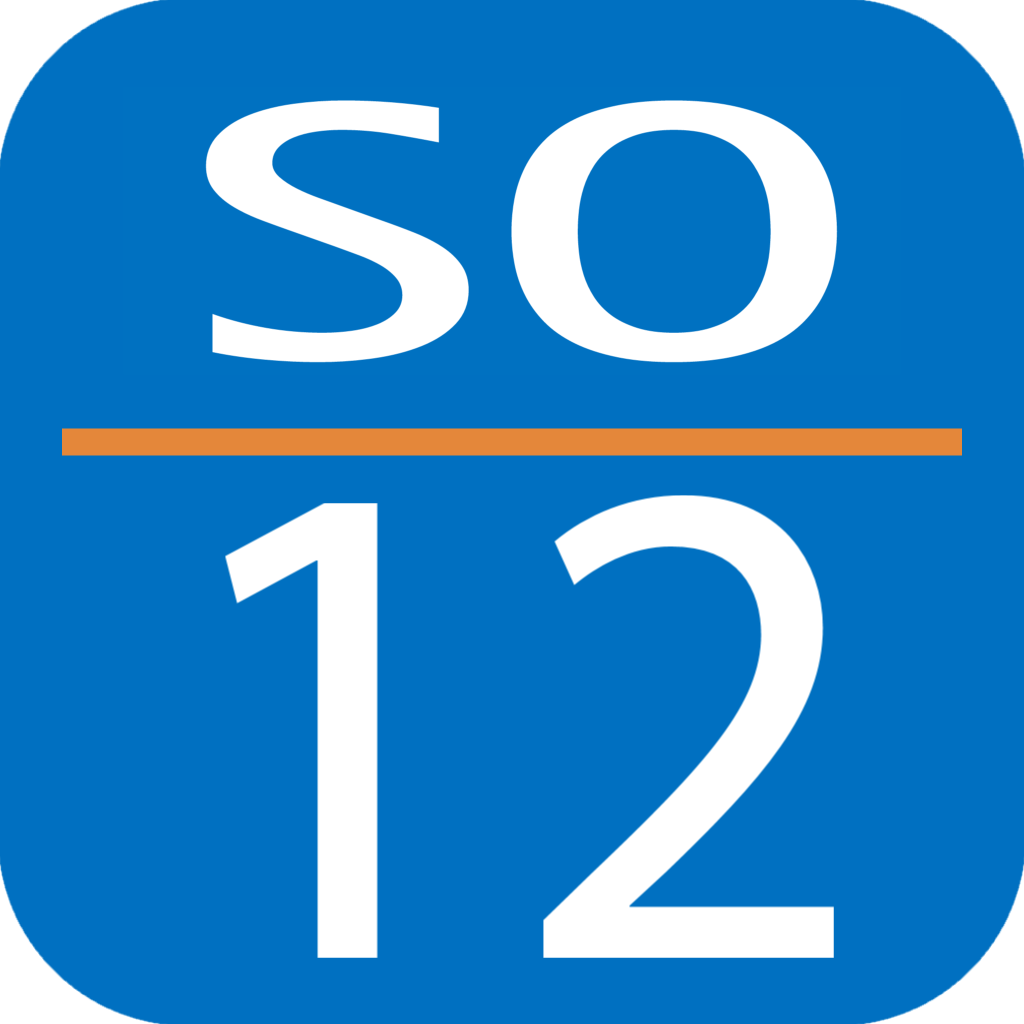
Mitsukyō Station 三ツ境駅

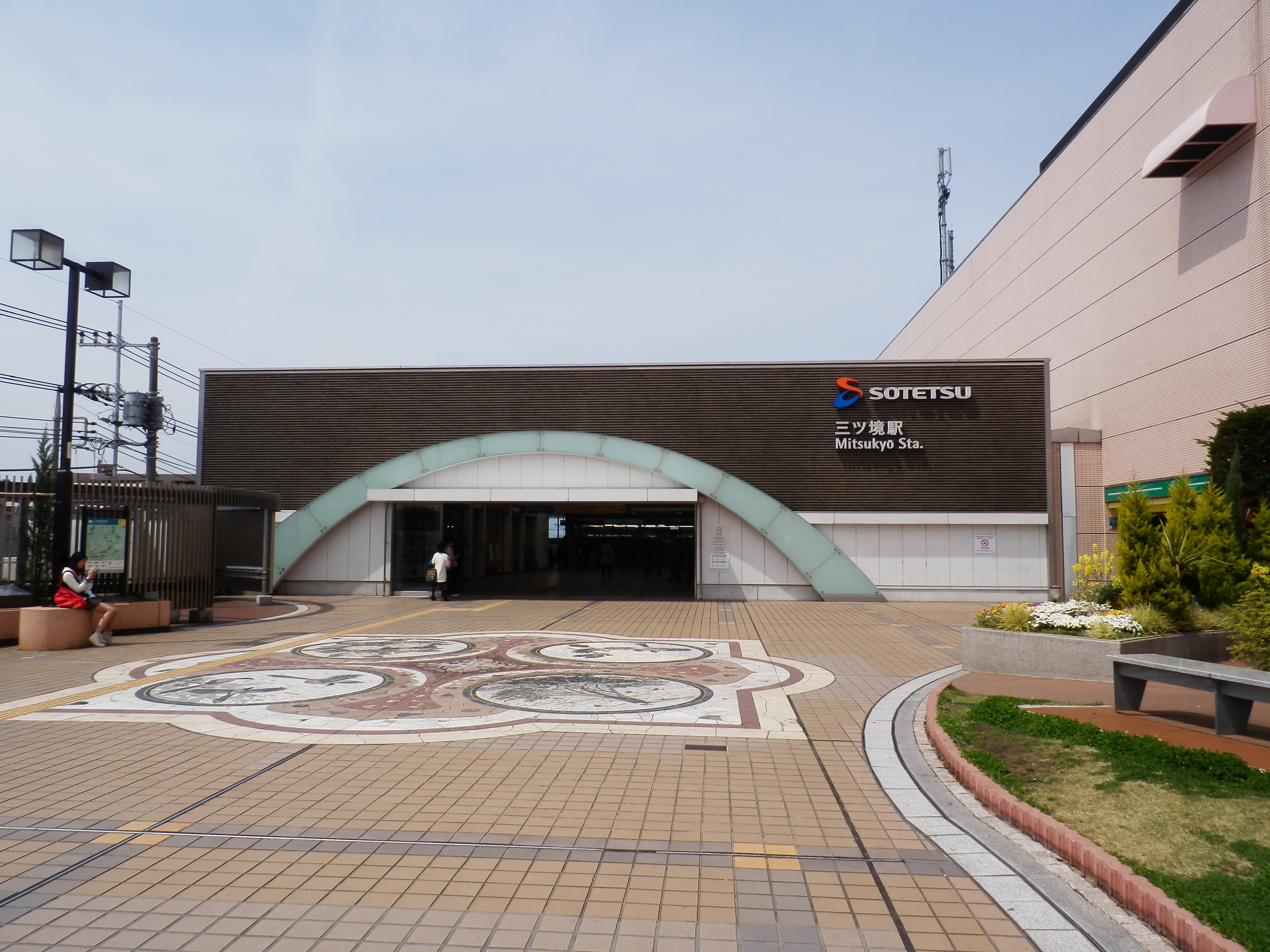
- Mitsukyō Station

General information
- Location: Mitsukyō 4, Seya-ku, Yokohama-shi, Kanagawa-ken 246-0022; Japan
- Coordinates: 35.4677481°N 139.5028281°E
- Operator: Sagami Railway
- Line: Sotetsu Main Line
- Distance: 13.6 km from Yokohama
- Platforms: 2 side platforms

Other information
- Station code: SO12
- Website: Official website

History
- Opened: May 12, 1926
- Rebuilt: October 1986

Passengers
- 2019: 57,806 daily

Services
Preceding station	Sagami Railway	Following station
Seya towards Ebina	Sōtetsu Main Line Commuter Express Rapid Local	Kibōgaoka towards Yokohama
Seya towards Ebina	Sōtetsu–JR Link Line Local	Kibōgaoka towards Shinjuku
Location
- Location within Kanagawa Prefecture Location within Japan

Mitsukyō Station (三ツ境駅, Mitsukyō-eki) is a passenger railway station located in Seya-ku, Yokohama, Japan, operated by the private railway operator Sagami Railway (Sotetsu).

== Lines ==
Mitsukyō Station is served by the Sagami Railway Main Line and lies 13.6 kilometers from the starting point of the line at Yokohama Station.

== Station layout ==
The station consists of two opposed side platforms serving two tracks. The station building is elevated, and located above the platforms and tracks.

=== Platforms ===
1	■ Sagami Line	for Yamato and Ebina
2	■ Sagami Line	for Futamata-gawa, Yokohama and Shin-Yokohama

== History ==
Mitsukyō Station was opened on May 12, 1926 as a station of the Jinchū Railway, the predecessor to the current Sagami Railway Main Line. The current station building was completed in October 1986.

== Passenger statistics ==
In fiscal 2019, the station was used by an average of 57,806 passengers daily.

The passenger figures for previous years are as shown below.

Fiscal year	daily average
2005	60,515
2010	59,664
2015	58,533

== Surrounding area ==
- St. Marianna University Hospital
- Kanagawa Prefectural Seya High School
- Kanagawa Prefectural Mitsusakai School for the Disabled
- Seya Ward General Government Building
- Seya Ward Office

== See also ==
- List of railway stations in Japan
