= Nishi-Yokohama Station =

Railway station in Yokohama, Japan

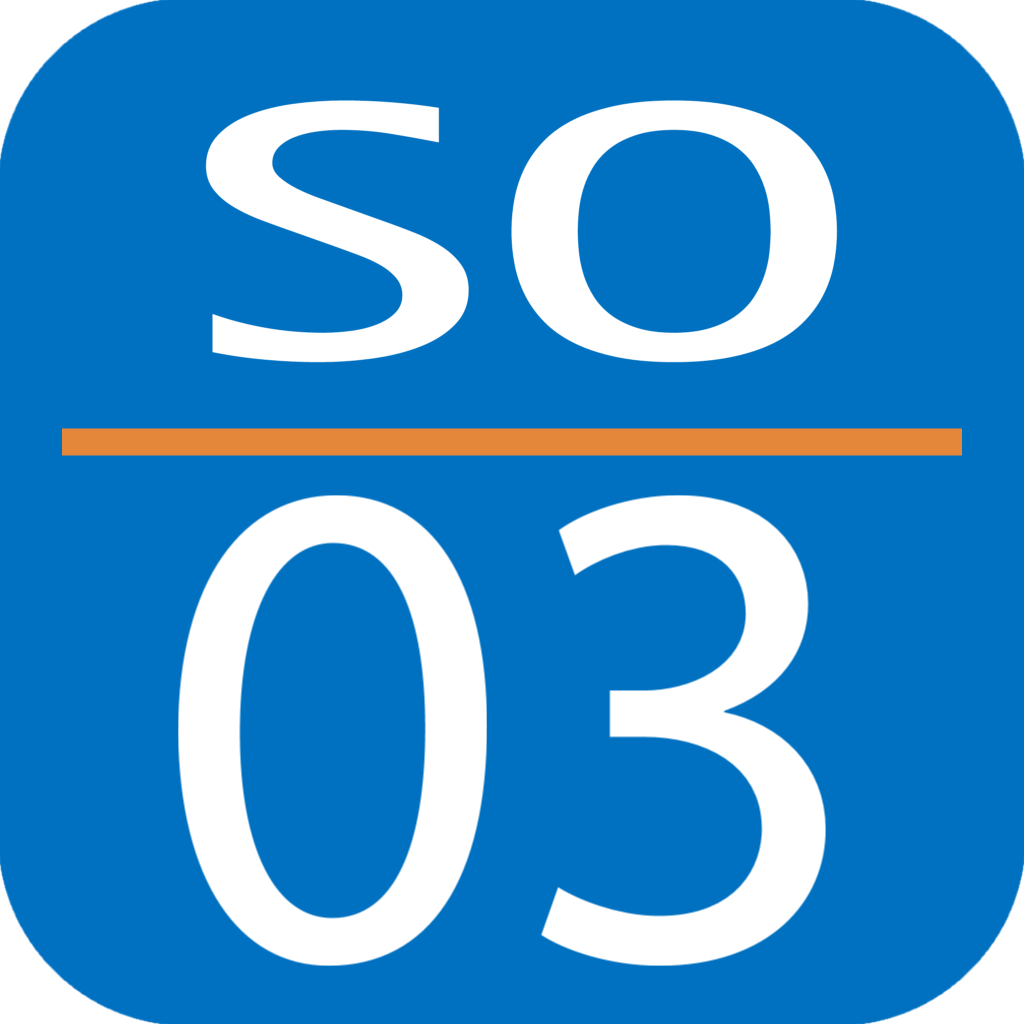
Nishi-Yokohama Station 西横浜駅

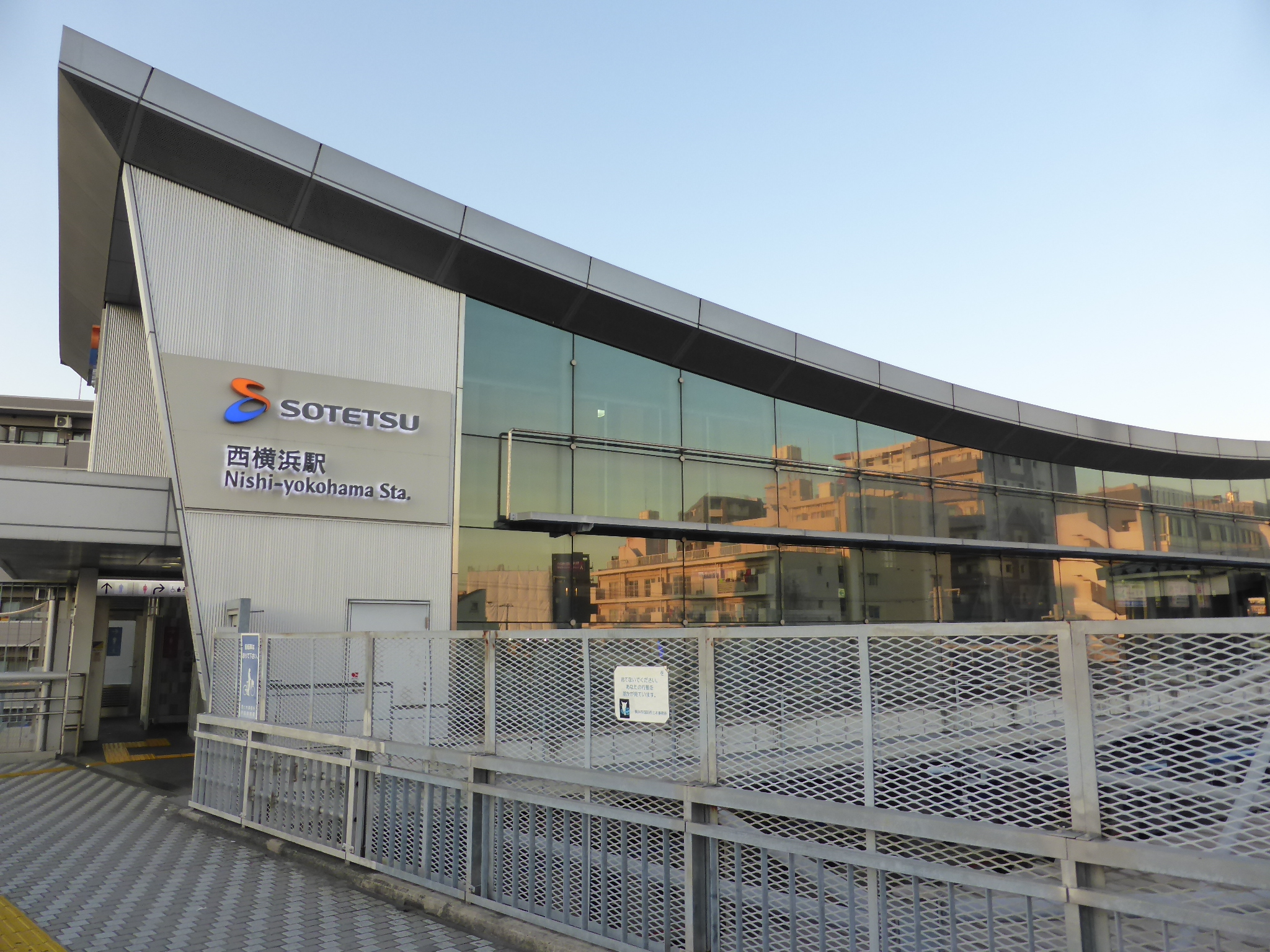
- Nishi-Yokohama Station, January 2015

General information
- Location: Nishi-Hiranuma chō 8-1, Nishi-ku, Yokohama-shi, Kanagawa-ken 220-0024; Japan
- Coordinates: 35.4537°N 139.6087°E
- Operator: Sagami Railway
- Line: Sotetsu Main Line
- Distance: 1.8 km from Yokohama
- Platforms: 1 island platform

Other information
- Station code: SO03
- Website: Official website

History
- Opened: February 14, 1929

Passengers
- 2019: 14,831 daily

Services
Preceding station	Sagami Railway	Following station
Tennōchō towards Ebina	Sōtetsu Main Line Local	Hiranumabashi towards Yokohama
Location
- Location within Kanagawa Prefecture Location within Japan

Nishi-Yokohama Station (西横浜駅, Nishi-Yokohama-eki) is a passenger railway station located in Nishi-ku, Yokohama, Japan, operated by the private railway operator Sagami Railway (Sotetsu).

== Lines ==
Nishi-Yokohama Station is served by the Sagami Railway Main Line, and lies 1.8 kilometers from the starting point of the line at Yokohama Station.

== Station layout ==
The station consists of a single island platform serving two tracks.

=== Platforms ===
1	■ Sagami Line	for Futamata-gawa • Yamato • Ebina • Izumino Line to Shonandai
2	■ Sagami Line	for Yokohama

== History ==
Nishi-Yokohama Station was opened on February 14, 1929 and was the terminal of the Jinchū Railway until the opening of Hiranumabashi Station in 1931. The station was primarily a freight terminal connecting the Sotetsu Line with the national railway's freight terminal at Hodogaya Station via a short branch line. The freight service on the branch was discontinued on September 30, 1979. On February 14, 1993 an unexploded bomb from World War II was discovered during construction work near the station. The current station building dates from June 26, 2005.

== Passenger statistics ==
In fiscal 2019, the station was used by an average of 14,831 passengers daily.

The passenger figures for previous years are as shown below.

Fiscal year	daily average
2005	12,347
2010	12,976
2015	13,878

== Surrounding area ==
- Fujidana Shopping Street
- Nico Nico Shopping Street
- Nishimae Shopping Street
- Japan National Route 1

== See also ==
- List of railway stations in Japan
