= Hiranumabashi Station =

Railway station in Yokohama, Kanagawa Prefecture, Japan

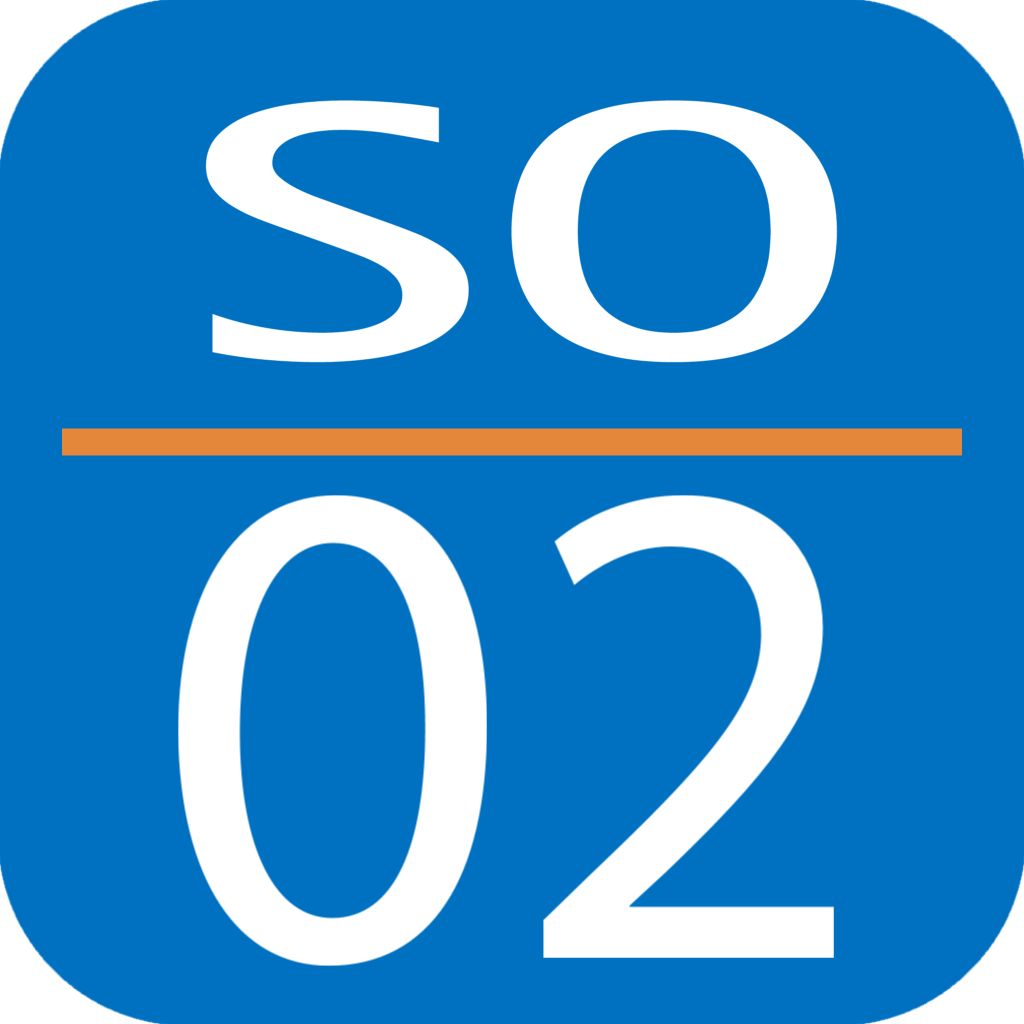
Hiranumabashi Station 平沼橋駅

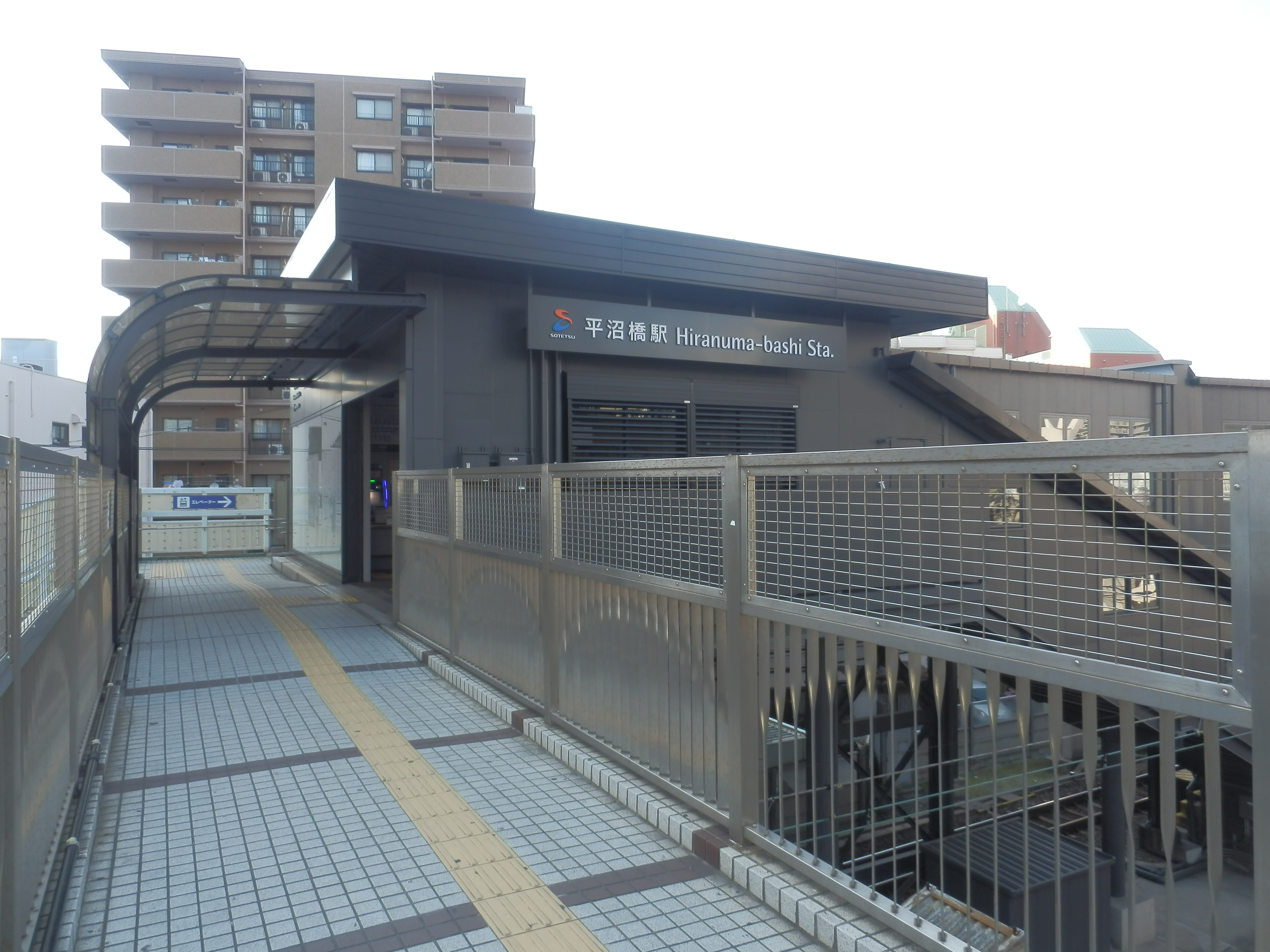
- Hiranumabashi Station building in April 2016

General information
- Location: 3–7 Nishi-Hiranumachō, Nishi-ku, Yokohama-shi, Kanagawa-ken 220-0024; Japan
- Coordinates: 35°27′34.13″N 139°36′58.34″E
- Operator: Sagami Railway
- Line: Sotetsu Main Line
- Distance: 0.9 km from Yokohama
- Platforms: 1 island platform

Other information
- Station code: SO02
- Website: Official website

History
- Opened: 25 October 1931

Passengers
- 2019: 8,926 daily

Services
Preceding station	Sagami Railway	Following station
Nishi-Yokohama towards Ebina	Sōtetsu Main Line Local	Yokohama Terminus
Location
- Location within Kanagawa Prefecture Location within Japan

Hiranumabashi Station (平沼橋駅, Hiranumabashi-eki) is a passenger railway station located in Nishi-ku, Yokohama, Japan, operated by the private railway operator Sagami Railway (Sotetsu).

== Lines ==
Hiranumabashi Station is served by the Sotetsu Main Line, and lies 0.9 kilometers from the starting point of the line at Yokohama Station.

== Station layout ==
The station consists of a single island platform serving two tracks. The tracks of the Yokosuka Line and Tōkaidō Main Line run immediately adjacent Hiranumabashi Station, however these lines do not serve the station.

=== Platforms ===
1	■ Sotetsu Main Line	for Futamata-gawa • Yamato • Ebina • Izumino Line to Shonandai
2	■ Sotetsu Main Line	for Yokohama

== History ==
The station was the terminal of the line for two years between 1931 and 1933. The Jinchū Railway originating at Atsugi Station reached Nishi-Yokohama Station and was connected with the Tōkaidō Main Line (via the freight branch to Hodogaya Station) in 1929. The railway then extended the line toward Yokohama Station in two phases: first to Hiranumabashi Station on 25 October 1931 and then to the permanent terminal in Yokohama on 27 December 1933.

The track between Nishi-Yokohama and Hiranumabashi was originally a siding of the Tōkaidō Main Line and was leased to the Jinchū Railway.

== Passenger statistics ==
In fiscal 2019, the station was used by an average of 8,926 passengers daily.

The passenger figures for previous years are as shown below.

Fiscal year	daily average
2005	6,379
2010	7,039
2015	8,014

== Surrounding area ==
- Yokohama City West Public Hall / West District Center
- Yokohama City Hiranuma Elementary School
- Yokohama City Okano Junior High School
- Kanagawa Prefectural Yokohama Hiranuma High School

== See also ==
- List of railway stations in Japan
