= Seya Station =

Railway station in Yokohama, Japan

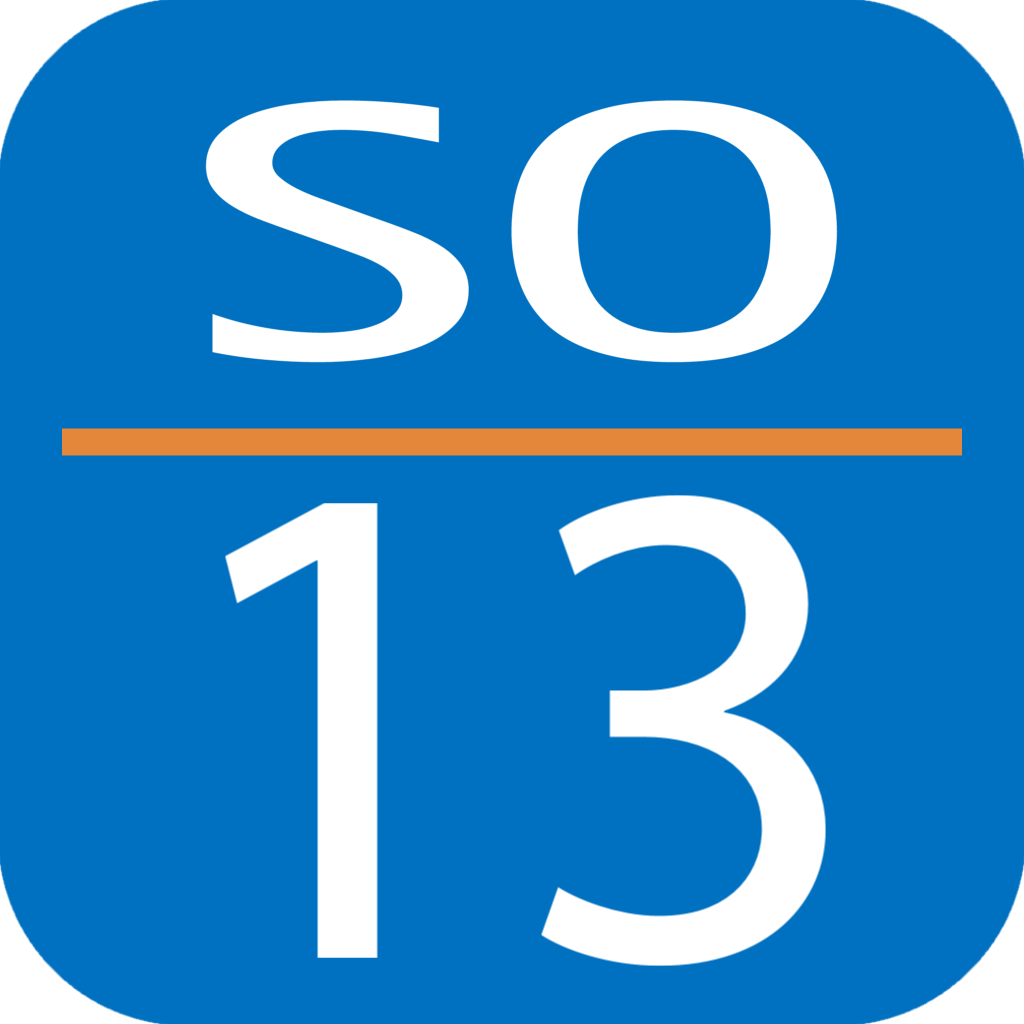
Seya Station 瀬谷駅

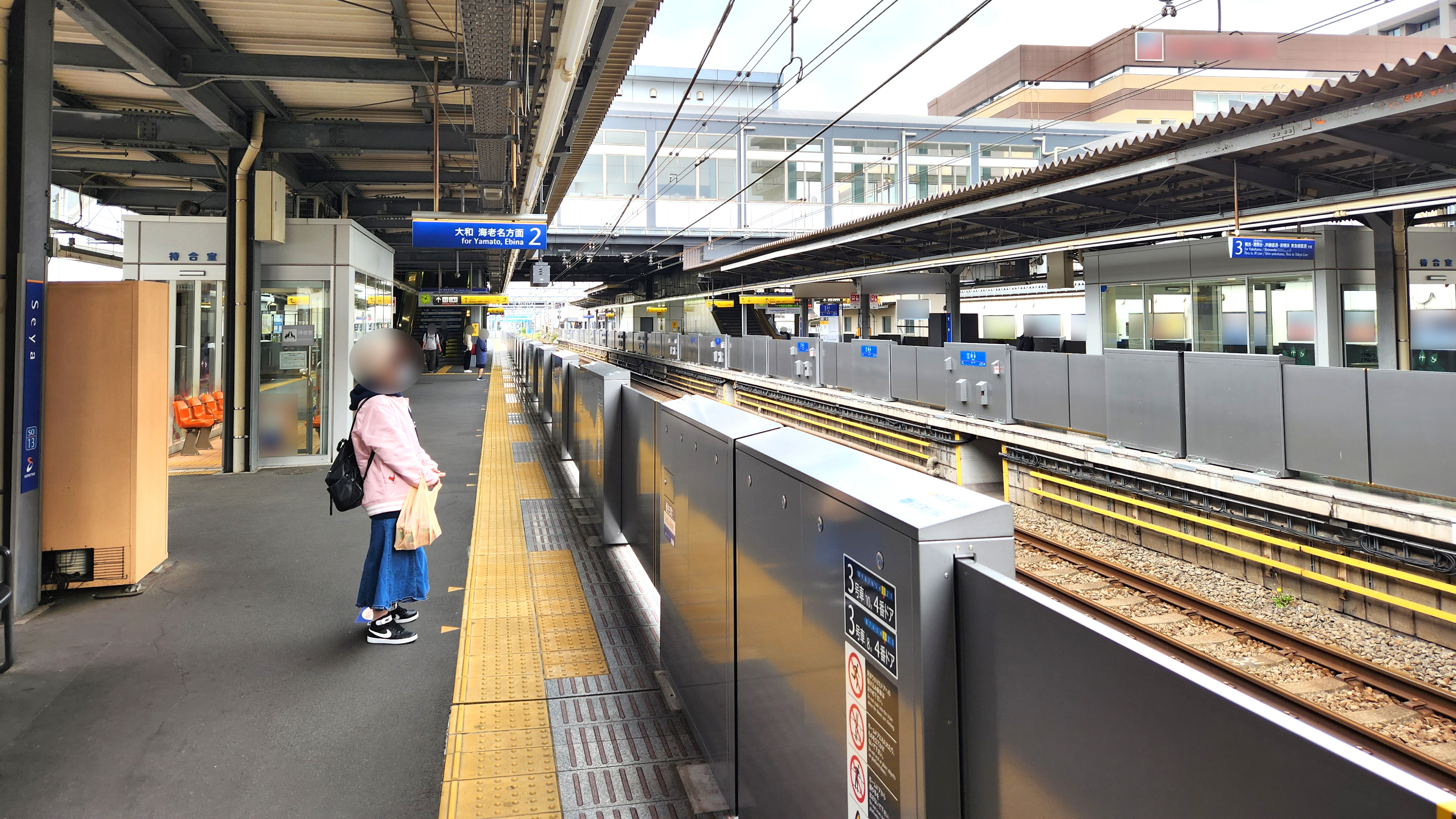
- Platforms

General information
- Location: Seya 4-1-1, Seya-ku, Yokohama-shi, Kanagawa-ken 246-0031; Japan
- Coordinates: 35.4702995°N 139.4825077°E
- Operator: Sagami Railway
- Line: Sotetsu Main Line
- Distance: 15.5 km from Yokohama
- Platforms: 2 island platforms

Other information
- Station code: SO13
- Website: Official website

History
- Opened: May 12, 1926

Passengers
- 2019: 44,085 daily

Services
Preceding station	Sagami Railway	Following station
Yamato towards Ebina	Sōtetsu Main Line Commuter Express Rapid Local	Mitsukyō towards Yokohama
Yamato towards Ebina	Sōtetsu–JR Link Line Local	Mitsukyō towards Shinjuku
Location
- Location within Kanagawa Prefecture Location within Japan

Seya Station (瀬谷駅, Seya-eki) is a passenger railway station located in Seya-ku, Yokohama, Japan, operated by the private railway operator Sagami Railway (Sotetsu).

== Lines ==
Seya Station is served by the Sagami Railway Main Line, and lies 15.5 kilometers from the starting point of the line at Yokohama Station.

== Station layout ==
The station consists of two island platforms. The station building is elevated, and located above the platforms and tracks.

=== Platforms ===
1, 2	■ Sagami Line	for Yamato and Ebina
3, 4	■ Sagami Line	for Futamata-gawa, Yokohama and Shin-Yokohama

== History ==
Seya Station was opened on May 12, 1926 as a station of the Jinchū Railway, the predecessor to the current Sagami Railway Main Line. The current station building was completed on March 28, 2004.

== Passenger statistics ==
In fiscal 2019, the station was used by an average of 44,085 passengers daily.

The passenger figures for previous years are as shown below.

Fiscal year	daily average
2005	41,517
2010	42,887
2015	44,474

== Surrounding area ==
- Yokohama City Seya Junior High School
- Yokohama City Seya Elementary School
- Seya Special Education School
- Yokohama City Seya Library
- Yokohama City Seya District Center
- Yokohama City Seya Sports Center

== See also ==
- List of railway stations in Japan
