= Seya-ku =

Seya 瀬谷区
- Ward
- Seya Ward
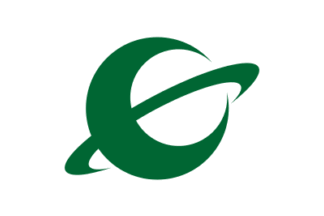
- Flag
- /0/queryThe property query is required; /0/idsThe property ids is required; /0Failed to match at least one schema; /0/titleThe property title is required; /0/serviceDoes not have a value in the enumeration ["page"]; /0Failed to match exactly one schema; /0/geometriesThe property geometries is required; /0/typeDoes not have a value in the enumeration ["GeometryCollection"]; /0/typeDoes not have a value in the enumeration ["MultiPolygon"]; /0/typeDoes not have a value in the enumeration ["Point"]; /0/typeDoes not have a value in the enumeration ["MultiPoint"]; /0/typeDoes not have a value in the enumeration ["LineString"]; /0/typeDoes not have a value in the enumeration ["MultiLineString"]; /0/typeDoes not have a value in the enumeration ["Polygon"]; /0/coordinatesThe property coordinates is required; /0/geometryThe property geometry is required; /0/typeDoes not have a value in the enumeration ["Feature"]; /0/featuresThe property features is required; /0/typeDoes not have a value in the enumeration ["FeatureCollection"]
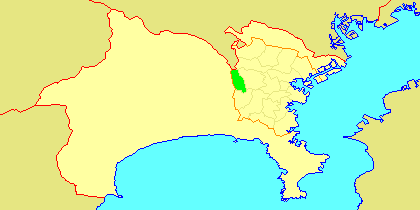
- Location of Seya in Kanagawa

- Seya (Japan)
- Coordinates: 35°27′59″N 139°29′57″E
- Country: Japan
- Region: Kantō
- Prefecture: Kanagawa
- City: Yokohama

Government
  - Mayor: City logo

Area
  - Total: 17.11 km^{2} (6.61 sq mi)

Population (February 2010)
  - Total: 126,839
  - Density: 7,390/km^{2} (19,100/sq mi)
- Time zone: UTC+9 (Japan Standard Time)
- City symbols
  - Tree: Zelkova serrata
  - Flower: Hydrangea
  - Bird: Azure-winged magpie
- Address: 190 Futatsubashi-chō, Seya-ku Yokohama-shi, Kanagawa-ken; 246-0021
- Website: Seya Ward Office

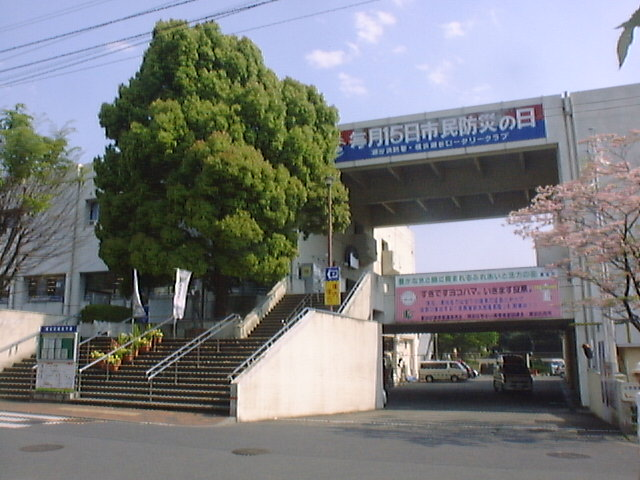
Seya Ward Office

Seya-ku (瀬谷区) is one of the 18 wards of the city of Yokohama in Kanagawa Prefecture, Japan. As of 2010, the ward had an estimated population of 126,839 and a density of 7,390 persons per km^{2}. The total area was 17.16 km^{2}.

== Geography ==
Seya Ward is located in eastern Kanagawa Prefecture, and on the northwestern borders of the city of Yokohama. The area is largely flatland, with scattered small hills.

=== Surrounding municipalities ===
- Asahi Ward
- Midori Ward
- Izumi Ward
- Yamato, Kanagawa
- Machida, Tokyo

== History ==
The area around present-day Seya Ward has been inhabited continuously for thousands of years. Archaeologists have found stone tools from the Japanese Paleolithic period and ceramic shards from the Jōmon period, house ruins from the Yayoi period and tombs from the Kofun period at numerous locations in the area. Under the Nara period Ritsuryō system, it became part of Kamakura District in Sagami Province. By the Kamakura period, parts of Seya were part of a shōen which supported the Shinto shrine of Tsurugaoka Hachimangū. The Kamakura-kaidō, a highway linking Kamakura with the provinces in northern Japan also passed through the area. During the Muromachi period, Seya was a contested territory between the competing Uesugi clan and Ashikaga clan until the area was seized by the Later Hōjō clan from Odawara in the late Sengoku period. After the defeat of the Hōjō at the Battle of Odawara, the territory came under the control of Tokugawa Ieyasu. It was administered as tenryō territory controlled directly by the Tokugawa shogunate, but administered through various hatamoto. The area prospered in the Edo period as a post station on the Kamakura-kaidō and Nakahara-kaidō highways connecting Edo with Kamakura and with the provinces of central Honshu. At times, Seya was administered by Totsuka-juku, Fujisawa-shuku, and towards the Bakumatsu period came under the control of the Nirayama daikansho . After the Meiji Restoration, Seya was transferred to the short-lived Nirayama Prefecture, before becoming part of the new Kanagawa Prefecture in 1868. In the cadastral reform of April 1, 1889, the area was divided into several villages under Kamakura District. During the Meiji period, the area was a center for sericulture. Seya suffered relatively little damage from the 1923 Great Kantō earthquake, with one fatality and 53 houses destroyed. The Sagami Railway Main Line connected the area with Yokohama in 1926.

On April 1, 1939, Seya was annexed by the neighboring city of Yokohama, becoming part of Totsuka Ward. During World War II, Seya hosted numerous military facilities, including munitions plants and training grounds. Seya Station was destroyed in an air strike in January 1945 and the populated areas were destroyed in a fire-bombing air raid by USAAF B-29 Superfortress bombers on April 3, 1945.

In the post-war period, a USAF B-57 Canberra bomber based at nearby Atsugi Naval Air Facility crashed on October 27, 1957, with the loss of one civilian on the ground, and on November 27, 1961, an F8U Crusader crashed in a residential area. In a major administrative reorganization of October 1, 1969, Totsuka-ku was divided, and Seya emerged as an independent ward within Yokohama.

== Economy ==
Seya Ward is largely a regional commercial center and bedroom community for central Yokohama and Tokyo. The industrial part has access to the Tōmei Highway, and there are a number of newspaper printing plants, chemical plants, and warehouse/transshipment centers. There is some residual agriculture in Seya, primarily livestock.

== Transportation ==
=== Railroads ===
- Sagami Railway Main Line
  - Mitsukyō - Seya
- The Tōkaidō Shinkansen and Tōkaidō Main Line pass through Seya Ward, but without any stations.

=== Highways ===
- Route 16
- Route 246

== Education ==
Kanagawa Prefectural Board of Education operates prefectural senior high schools:

- Seya High School
- Seya-Nishi High School

Private secondary school:

- Yokohama Hayato Junior & Senior High School

Yokohama Municipal Board of Education operates municipal elementary schools and junior high schools.

Junior high schools:

- Azumano (東野)
- Hara (原)
- Minami-seya (南瀬谷)
- Seya (瀬谷)
- Shimoseya (下瀬谷)

Elementary schools:

- Aizawa (相沢)
- Akuwa (阿久和)
- Daimon (大門)
- Futatsubashi (二つ橋)
- Hara (原)
- Kami-seya (上瀬谷)
- Minami-seya (南瀬谷)
- Mitsukyō (三ツ境)
- Seya (瀬谷)
- Seya-Daini (No. 2) (瀬谷第二)
- Seya-Sakura (瀬谷さくら)

Additionally, Shinbashi Elementary School (新橋小学校), outside of Seya-ku, has an attendance zone including parts of Seya-ku.

== Noted people from Seya ==
- Kazue Itoh, actress
- Masahiko Kondō, singer, actor
- Yuzo Kurihara, professional soccer player
- Atsushi Mio, professional soccer player
