= Asahi-ku, Yokohama =

Asahi 旭区
- Ward
- Asahi Ward
- Flag
- Interactive map of Asahi
- Asahi (Japan)
- Coordinates: 35°28′29″N 139°32′41″E
- Country: Japan
- Region: Kantō
- Prefecture: Kanagawa
- City: Yokohama

Area
  - Total: 32.77 km^{2} (12.65 sq mi)

Population (February 2010)
  - Total: 249,045
  - Density: 7,600/km^{2} (20,000/sq mi)
- Time zone: UTC+9 (Japan Standard Time)
- Tree: Enkianthus
- Flower: Japanese Morning Glory
- Phone number: 045-954-6161
- Address: 1-4-12 Tsurugamine, Asahi-ku Yokohama-shi, Kanagawa-ken 241-0022
- Website: web.archive.org/web/20060617160639/http://www.city.yokohama.jp:80/me/asahi/english/index-e.html

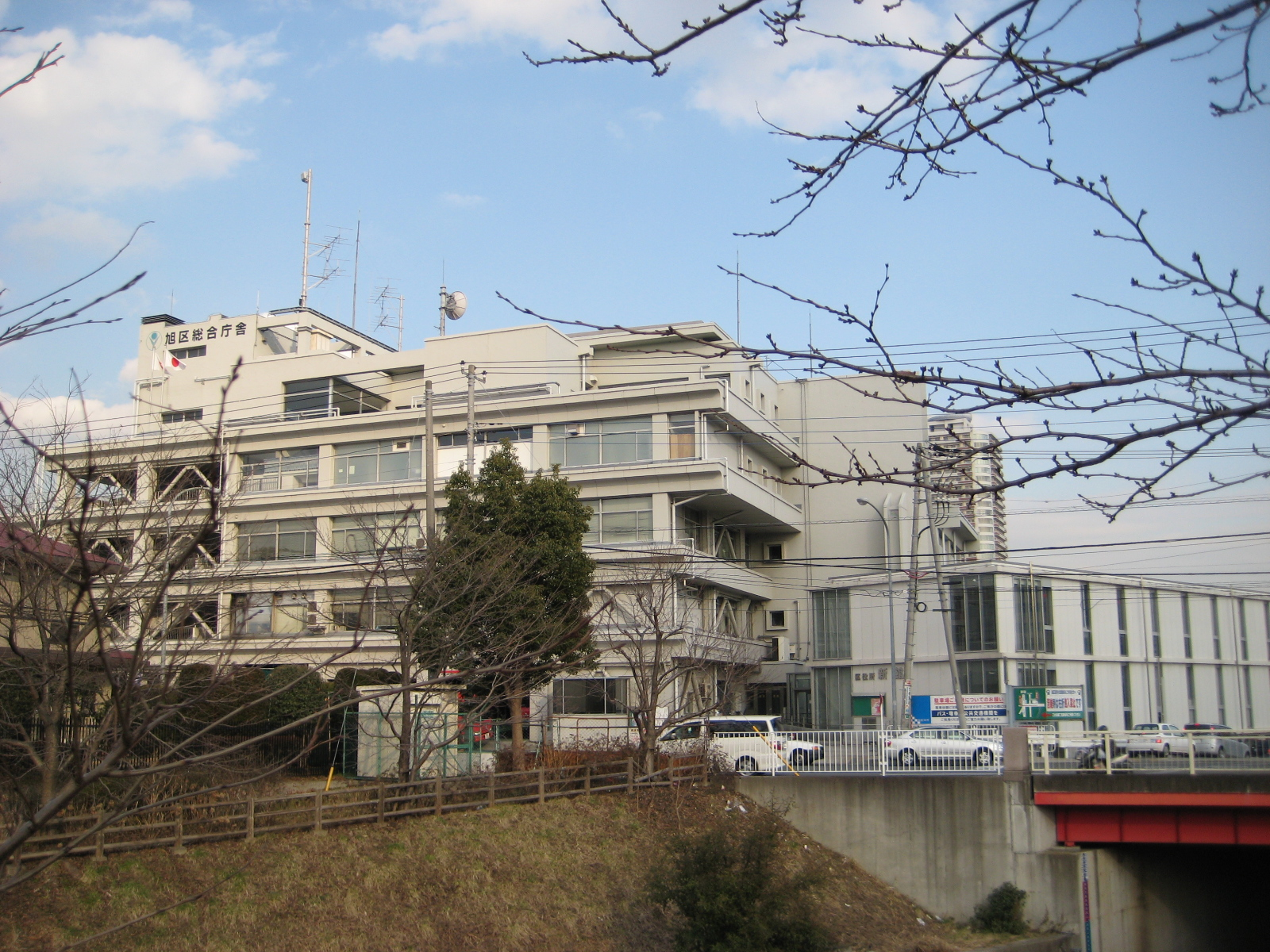
Asahi Ward Office

Asahi-ku (旭) is one of the 18 wards of the city of Yokohama in Kanagawa Prefecture, Japan. As of 2010, the ward has an estimated population of 249,045 and a population density of 7,600 persons per km^{2}. The total area is 32.77 km^{2}.

== Geography ==
Asahi is located in eastern Kanagawa Prefecture, and on the northwest borders of the city of Yokohama.

=== Surrounding municipalities ===
- Seya Ward
- Totsuka Ward
- Midori Ward
- Izumi Ward
- Hodogaya Ward

== History ==
The area around present-day Asahi Ward was formerly part of Tsuzuki District in Musashi Province. By the Heian period it was part of a huge shōen administered by the Hangaya clan, a subsidiary of the Hatakeyama clan. During the Edo period, it was a rural region classified as tenryō territory controlled directly by the Tokugawa shogunate, but administered through various hatamoto. After the Meiji Restoration, the area became part of the new Kanagawa Prefecture in 1868. In the cadastral reform of April 1, 1889, the area was divided into numerous villages. During the Meiji period, the area was a center for sericulture. The area began to urbanize only during the 1920s and 1930s with the building of the Sagami Railway Main Line. On October 1, 1927, it was annexed by the neighboring city of Yokohama, becoming part of Hodogaya Ward. In a major administrative reorganization of October 1, 1969, Asahi Ward was separated from Hodogaya Ward, becoming an independent ward within the city of Yokohama.

== Economy ==
Asahi Ward is largely a regional commercial center and bedroom community for central Yokohama and Tokyo.

== Transportation ==
=== Railroads ===
- Sagami Railway – Sagami Railway Main Line
  - Tsurugamine - Futamata-gawa - Kibōgaoka
- Sagami Railway – Sagami Railway Izumino Line
  - Futamata-gawa - Minami-Makigahara

The Tōkaidō Shinkansen passes through Asahi Ward, but has no stations.

=== Highways ===
- Japan National Route 16
- Hodogaya Bypass

==== Prefectural roads ====
- Kanagawa Prefectural Route 40
- Kanagawa Prefectural Route 45
- Kanagawa Prefectural Route 401
- Kanagawa Prefectural Route 402

== Education ==
Prefectural high schools are operated by the Kanagawa Prefecture Board of Education. Prefectural senior high schools:

- Asahi High School
- Futamatagawa Nursing And Welfare Senior High School
- Kibōgaoka High School
- Yokohama Kyokuryō High School

Private secondary schools:

- Seisa Junior & Senior High School - JHS and HS
- Yokohama Fujimigaoka Gakuen - JHS and HS
- Yokohama Shōdai High School

The Yokohama Municipal Board of Education operates public elementary and junior high schools.

Public junior high schools:

- Asahi (旭)
- Asahi-Kita (旭北)
- Honjuku (本宿)
- Imajuku (今宿)
- Kami-shirane (上白根)
- Kibōgaoka (希望が丘)
- Makigahara (万騎が原)
- Minami-Kibōgaoka (南希望が丘)
- Sakon-yama (左近山)
- Tsuoka (都岡)
- Tsurugamine (鶴ケ峯)
- Wakabadai (若葉台)

Primary schools:

- Fudōmaru (不動丸)
- Futamatagawa (二俣川)
- Higashi-Kibōgaoka (東希望が丘)
- Honjuku (本宿)
- Ichisawa (市沢)
- Imajuku (今宿)
- Imajuku-Minami (今宿南)
- Kami-kawai (上川井)
- Kami-shirane (上白根)
- Kawai (川井)
- Kibōgaoka (希望ケ丘)
- Makigahara (万騎が原)
- Minami-Honjuku (南本宿)
- Nakao (中尾)
- Nakazawa (中沢)
- Sachigaoka (さちが丘)
- Sakon-yama (左近山)
- Sasanodai (笹野台)
- Shiki-no-mori (四季の森)
- Shirane (白根)
- Tsuoka (都岡)
- Tsurugamine (鶴ケ峯)
- Wakabadai (若葉台)
- Zenbu (善部)

Kamisugeda Sasa-no-oka Elementary School (上菅田笹の丘小学校) and Kawashima Elementary School (川島小学校), which have their campuses outside of Asahi-ku, have zones that include portions of Asahi-ku.

== Local attractions ==
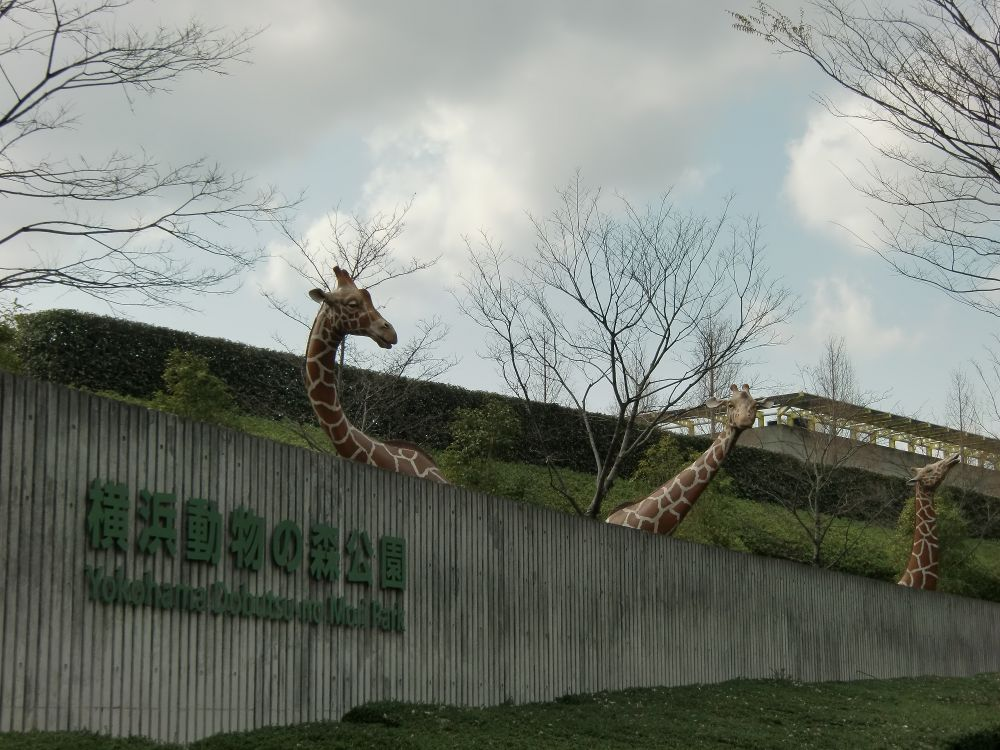
Yokohama Zoological Gardens

- Yokohama Zoological Gardens

== Notable people from Asahi Ward ==
- Hideyuki Awano, professional baseball player
- Ryō Kase, actor
- Kentarō Kobayashi, actor, artist
- Ryoko Yonekura, actress
