= Eastern Kanagawa Rail Link =

Railway line in Kanagawa Prefecture, Japan

The Eastern Kanagawa Rail Link (Japanese: 神奈川東部方面線, romanized: Kanagawa Tōbu Hōmen-sen) is a strategic railway project in Japan to improve the railway network connectivity and passenger convenience between the eastern Kanagawa Prefecture and Tokyo Metropolis, as well as access to Tōkaidō Shinkansen at Shin-Yokohama Station.

The new infrastructures of this project are constructed and owned by the Japan Railway Construction, Transport and Technology Agency (JRTT), which is an Independent Administrative Institution governed by the Ministry of Land, Infrastructure, Transport and Tourism, while operation is divided between Sagami Railway (Sōtetsu), JR East and Tōkyū Railways.

== Services ==
In its finalized form, this railway project comprises 2 major portions:

=== Sōtetsu–JR Link Line ===
Sōtetsu–JR Link Line (SJLL; Japanese: 相鉄・JR直通線, romanized: Sōtetsu JR chokutsū sen): Connecting Sōtetsu and JR East by a new 2.7-kilometre (1.7 mi) railroad, Sōtetsu Shin-yokohama Line, constructed between Nishiya and Hazawa yokohama-kokudai for entering the Tōkaidō Freight Line. This enables through service from Ebina (Sōtetsu) to Kawagoe (JR) via Ōsaki, Shibuya, Shinjuku and Ikebukuro alongside the Yamanote Line. It has entered service since 30 November 2019.

Regarding passenger information, northbound services on the Sōtetsu–JR Link Line continue through to the Saikyō Line via Ōsaki, where they interline with the Rinkai Line, which also offers northbound through service onto the Saikyō Line. It shares tracks with the Shōnan–Shinjuku Line between Musashi-Kosugi and Ikebukuro, and with the Yokosuka Line between Musashi-Kosugi and Nishi-Ōi.

In practice, the majority of Sōtetsu–JR Link Line trains terminate at Shinjuku station, with only few morning trains between 6 am and 9 am go beyond Shinjuku and terminate at either Ikebukuro, Akabane, Musashi-Urawa, Ōmiya or Kawagoe.

=== Sōtetsu–Tōkyū Link Line ===
Sōtetsu–Tōkyū Link Line (STLL; Japanese: 相鉄・東急直通線, romanized: Sōtetsu Tōkyū chokutsū sen): Connecting Sōtetsu and Tōkyū Railways with a new 10-kilometre (6.2 mi) railroad, which is divided into Sōtetsu Shin-yokohama Line and Tōkyū Shin-yokohama Line, constructed between Hazawa yokohama-kokudai and Hiyoshi via Shin-yokohama.

Sōtetsu–Tōkyū Shin-yokohama Station serves as an operational boundary between Sōtetsu and Tōkyū. This enables through services from Ebina or Shōnandai (Sōtetsu) to Shibuya (Tōyoko Line, which continues onward to Fukutoshin Line) and Meguro (Meguro Line, which continues onward to either Namboku Line or Mita Line). Furthermore, the through-running is possible via Fukutoshin Line to Ogawamachi (Tōbu Tōjō Line), or via Namboku Line to Urawa-misono (Saitama Rapid Railway Line). This has entered service since 18 March 2023.

== Background ==
Similar railway plans which proposed to connect different existing passenger railways for through service around the eastern Kanagawa regions had been devised before the Eastern Kanagawa Rail Link. In 1983, a team of experts of civil engineering, environmental management, railway, etc. proposed numerous public transit plans in a study of Kanagawa transportation infrastructure provision. Among those plans were new railroads which would connect Sōtetsu and/or Shin-yokohama with the Tōkaidō Freight Line for Haneda Airport, as well as Tsurugamine, Yokohama-Hazawa, Shin-yokohama and Ōkurayama to allow through service between Sōtetsu and Tōkyū.

The project which is codenamed the "Eastern Kanagawa Rail Link" began its infancy from the Transport Policy Review Forum in January 2000. In the initial proposal, a new railroad would connect Futamata-gawa of Sōtetsu to Ōkurayama of Tōkyū Railways via Shin-yokohama. Originally Sōtetsu, which was only operating within Kanagawa Prefecture and did not have any through service with other railway operators, was not interested in this plan, because a through service via Shin-yokohama would divert passengers away from its Yokohama hub terminus. However, as the population decline led to ridership drop of Sōtetsu, the rail company became more favorable towards the plan which improves connectivity with the Tokyo Metropolis and Saitama Prefecture. In September 2004, the Sōtetsu–JR Link Line plan was formally announced which would provide a more direct access to Shinjuku, Tokyo from areas served by Sōtetsu between Nishiya and Ebina.

In May 2005, the Urban Railroad Convenience Improvement Act was passed by the parliament of Japan and went into effect on 1 August 2005 with the aim of encouraging many different railway operators of major metropolitan areas of Japan to provide better and more convenient passenger experience via new railroads which would enable through services between different operators. The new law also stipulates a model which separate the construction/maintenance (整備主体) and operation (営業主体) of infrastructure to different entities.

Under this new law, in June 2006, the Ministry of Land, Infrastructure, Transport and Tourism approved the initial maintenance and operation plans of the Sōtetsu–JR Link Line (SJLL) and Sōtetsu–Tōkyū Link Line (STLL) submitted by the Japan Railway Construction, Transport and Technology Agency (JRTT). The SJLL was approved on 21 November 2006 and STLL on 11 April 2007.

== Financing ==
The Eastern Kanagawa Rail Link project was funded one-third from the national coffer, one-third from the local governments (both prefectural and municipal), and one-third from private loan. The JRTT coordinated the construction of this project, owns the completed rail infrastructure, and is responsible for its maintenance. Sōtetsu and Tōkyū collect the revenues from operating the railways owned by JRTT, and then they pay JRTT a portion of those revenues for maintenance and loan reimbursement for this project.

Both Sōtetsu and Tōkyū Railways applied to the Ministry of Land, Infrastructure, Transport and Tourism for an additional fare charge of using the new railways. This was due to the high cost of construction and the drop in estimated ridership from the initial projection, resulting from the COVID-19 pandemic.
