= Nishi-Ōi Station =

Railway station in Tokyo, Japan

Coordinates: 35.6019°N 139.7218°E

JO16 JS16 Nishi-Ōi Station 西大井駅
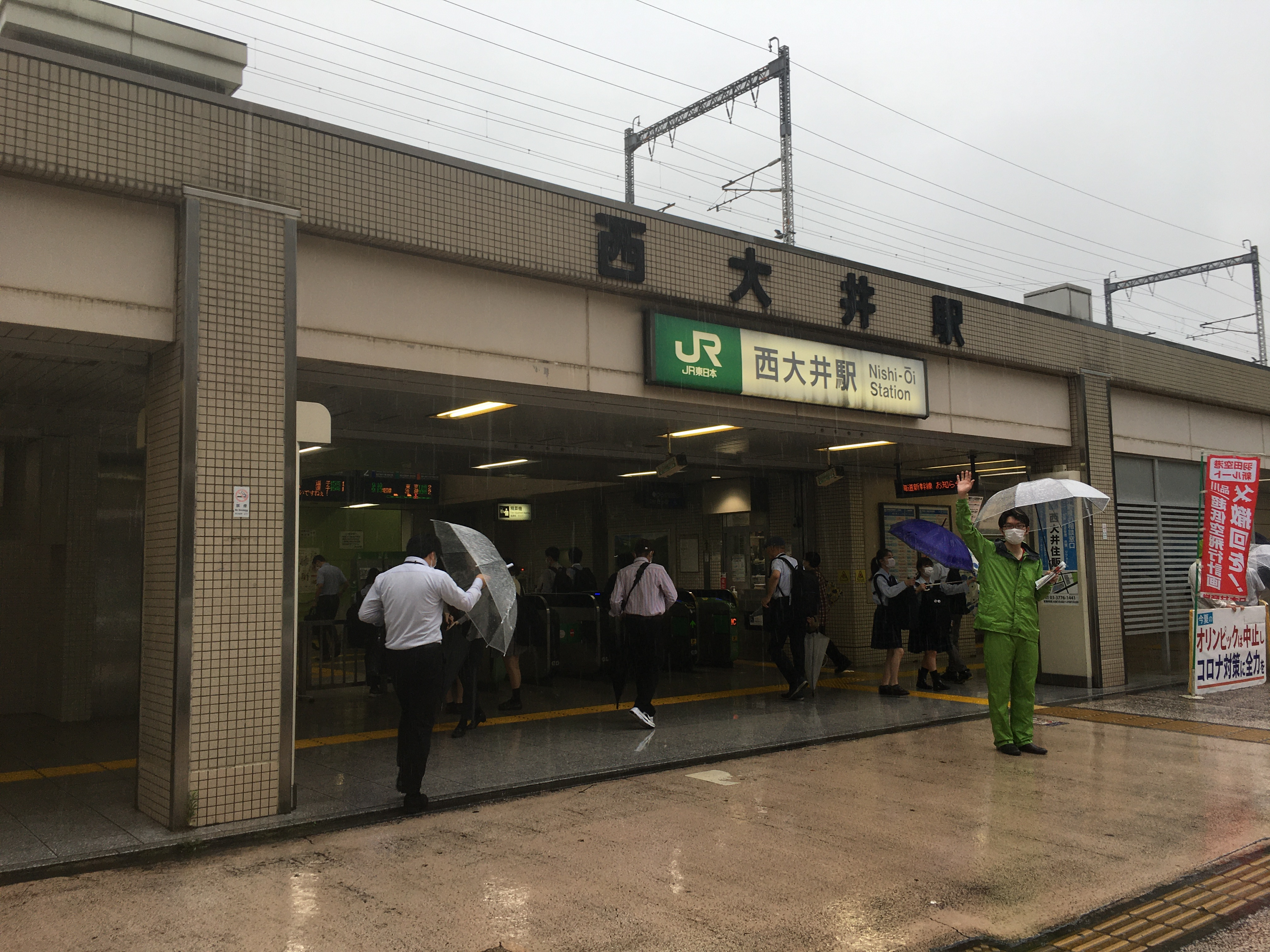
- Nishi-Ōi Station in July 2021

General information
- Location: 1 Nishi-Ōi, Shinagawa-ku, Tokyo; Japan
- Operator: JR East
- Lines: Yokosuka Line; Shonan-Shinjuku Line
- Platforms: 2 side platforms
- Tracks: 2
- Connections: Bus terminal

Construction
- Structure type: Elevated

Other information
- Station code: JO-16, JS-16

History
- Opened: 2 April 1986

Services
Preceding station	JR East	Following station
Musashi-Kosugi towards Kurihama	Yokosuka Line	Shinagawa towards Tokyo
Musashi-Kosugi towards Ebina	Sōtetsu–JR Link Line	Ōsaki towards Shinjuku
Musashi-Kosugi towards Zushi	Shōnan–Shinjuku Line Rapid Local	Ōsaki towards Utsunomiya
Location
- Location within Tokyo Location within Japan

Nishi-Ōi Station (西大井駅, Nishi-Ōi-eki) is a railway station on the Yokosuka Line in Shinagawa, Tokyo, Japan, operated by East Japan Railway Company (JR East).

== Station layout ==
The station is composed of two elevated side platforms and two tracks, and is located below the tracks of the Tōkaidō Shinkansen.

The line coming from Yokohama splits at this station to the Yokosuka Line toward Shinagawa Station and the Shōnan-Shinjuku Line toward Ōsaki Station.

=== Platforms ===
1	Yokosuka Line	for Musashi-Kosugi, Yokohama, Ōfuna, Zushi, and Kurihama
1	■ Through to Sōtetsu Line	for Musashi-Kosugi and Hazawa yokohama-kokudai Sotetsu Line for Nishiya and Ebina
2	Yokosuka Line	for Shinagawa, Tokyo, Funabashi, Chiba, and Narita Airport (Terminal 2·3 and Terminal 1)
2	Shōnan-Shinjuku Line	for Ōsaki, Shibuya, Shinjuku, Ikebukuro, Ōmiya, Oyama, and Utsunomiya
2	Through to Saikyō Line	for Ōsaki, Shibuya, Shinjuku and Ikebukuro

== History ==
The station opened on April 2, 1986. With the privatization of Japanese National Railways (JNR) on April 1, 1987, the station came under the control of JR East.

Shonan-Shinjuku Line services began operating on December 1, 2001.

== Surrounding area ==
- Grave of Hirobumi Ito
- Yogyokuin Nyoraiji Temple
- Core Stalle Nishi-Oi
- J-Tower Nishiooi
- Nishi-oi Hiroba Park
- Nishioi Ryokuchi Park
- Futaba Park
- Shinagawa Shouei Junior and Senior High School
- Ito Elementary School
- Nikon Oi Factory
- Nikon Systems
- Nikon Staff Service

== See also ==
- List of railway stations in Japan
