= Kamihoshikawa Station =

Railway station in Yokohama, Japan

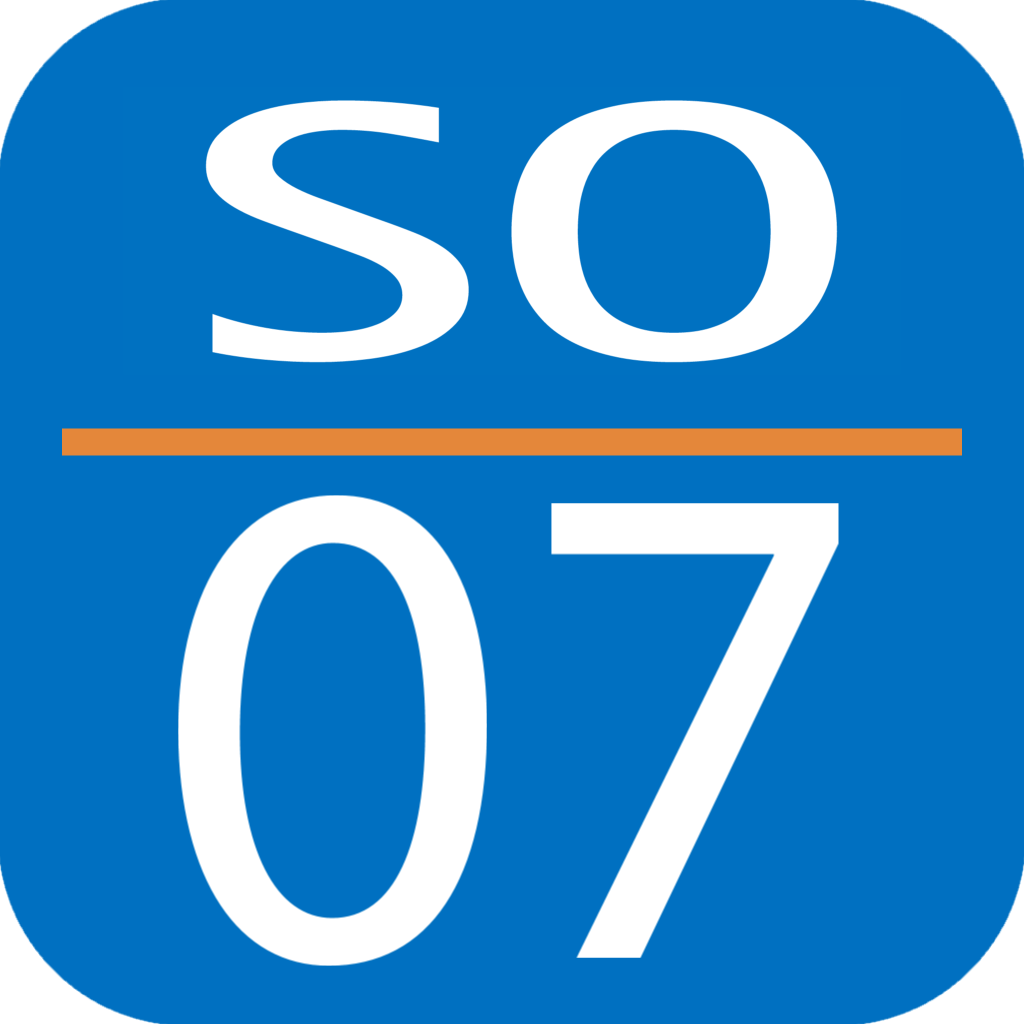
Kami-Hoshikawa Station 上星川駅

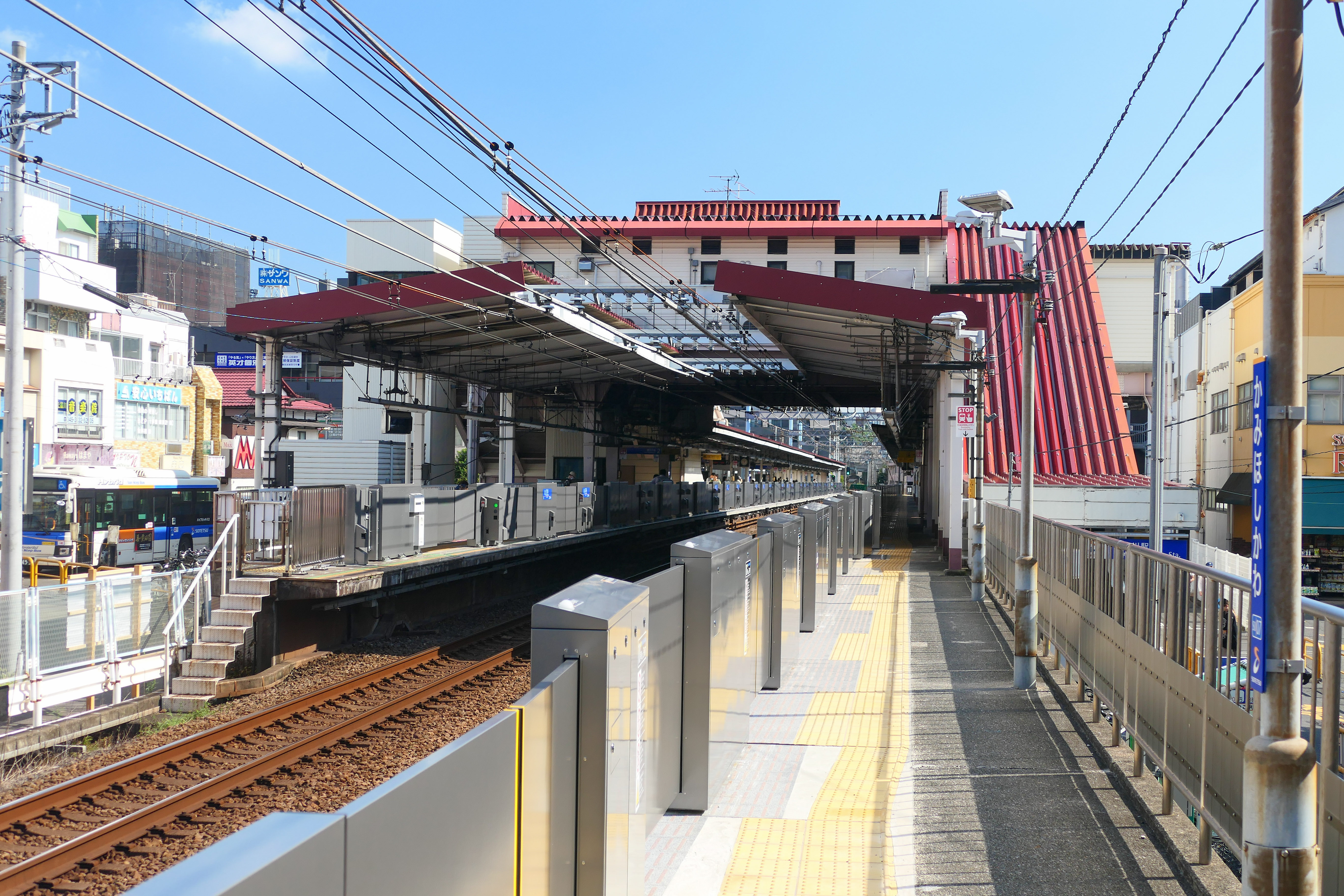
- Kami-Hoshikawa Station platforms

General information
- Location: Kami-Hoshikawa-chō 22, Hodogaya-ku, Yokohama-shi, Kanagawa-ken 240-0042; Japan
- Coordinates: 35.467285°N 139.580923°E
- Operator: Sagami Railway
- Line: Sotetsu Main Line
- Distance: 5.0 km from Yokohama
- Platforms: 2 side platforms

Other information
- Station code: SO07
- Website: Official website

History
- Opened: December 1, 1926
- Former names: Hoshikawa (until 1933)

Passengers
- 2019: 26,007 daily

Services
Preceding station	Sagami Railway	Following station
Nishiya towards Ebina	Sōtetsu Main Line Local	Wadamachi towards Yokohama
Location
- Location within Kanagawa Prefecture Location within Japan

Kami-Hoshikawa Station (上星川駅, Kamihoshikawa-eki) is a passenger railway station located in Hodogaya-ku, Yokohama, Japan, operated by the private railway operator Sagami Railway (Sotetsu).

== Lines ==
Kami-Hoshikawa Station is served by the Sagami Railway Main Line, and lies 5.0 kilometers from the starting point of the line at Yokohama Station.

== Station layout ==
The station consists of two opposed side platforms connected by a footbridge.

=== Platforms ===
1	■ Sagami Line	for Futamata-gawa • Yamato • Ebina • Izumino Line to Shonandai
2	■ Sagami Line	for Yokohama

== History ==
Kamihoshikawa Station was established on December 1, 1926, as Hoshikawa Station (星川駅, Hoshikawa-eki) on the Kanchū Railway Company (the predecessor to the present Sagami Railway). The station was given its present name on April 1, 1933. The current station building was completed on November 22, 1972.

== Passenger statistics ==
In fiscal 2019, the station was used by an average of 26,007 passengers daily.

The passenger figures for previous years are as shown below.

Fiscal year	daily average
2005	21,905
2010	23,407
2015	25,032

== Surrounding area ==
- Japan National Route 16
- Yokohama City Hodogaya Junior High School
- Yokohama City Tokiwadai Elementary School
- Yokohama National University

== Bus services ==
Yokohama Municipal Bus (Shiei), Kanagawa Chuo Kotsu (Kanachu), Sagami Railway (Sotetsu)

=== Kamihoshikawa Station (上星川駅, -eki) (North Ent.) bus stop ===
<浜11>	Yokohama garage ・ Yokohama Station West Ent. (via Kamadai)	(Sotetsu)
<浜13>	Yokohama garage ・ Yokohama Sta. West Ent. (via Hazawa)	(Sotetsu)

=== Kamihoshikawa (上星川) (Route 16 down side) bus stop ===
<121>	Shin-Yokohama Station	(Shiei)
<83>	Asahi Glass	(Shiei)
<92>	Sasayama Housing Complex Center (Express)	(Shiei)
<1>	Nakayama Sta. ・ Midori garage (via Kami-Sugeta)	(Shiei)
<横51>	Nakayama Sta. (via Kami-Sugeta)	(Kanachu)
<119>	Kamoi Station (via Araicho)	(Shiei, Kanachu)
<62>	Senmarudai Housing Complex	(Shiei, Sotetsu, Kanachu)
<旭10>	Yokohama Zoo (via Tsurugamine Station)	(Sotetsu)
<横52>	Nakayama Sta. (via Tsurugamine Sta., Kawaishuku)	(Kanachu)
<5>	Wakabadai Center ・ Kamenokoyama (via Tsurugamine Sta., Kawaishuku)	(Shiei)
<横04>	Tsuruma Sta. East Ent. (via Tsurugamine Sta., Kawaishuku, Kamenokoyama)	(Kanachu)

=== Kamihoshikawa (上星川) (Route 16 up side) bus stop ===
<62,92>	Yokohama Sta. (Express)	(Shiei, Kanachu, Sotetsu)
<5,83><横04,横51,横52><旭10>	Yokohama Sta. (via Kofukuji)	(Shiei, Kanachu, Sotetsu)
<1>	Yokohama Sta. (via Mitsuzawa-Kamicho)	(Shiei)
<121>	Hodogaya garage	(Shiei)
<119>	Mine School (Weekday/Saturday only)	(Shiei, Kanachu)

== See also ==
- List of railway stations in Japan
