= Tsurugamine Station =

Railway station in Yokohama, Japan

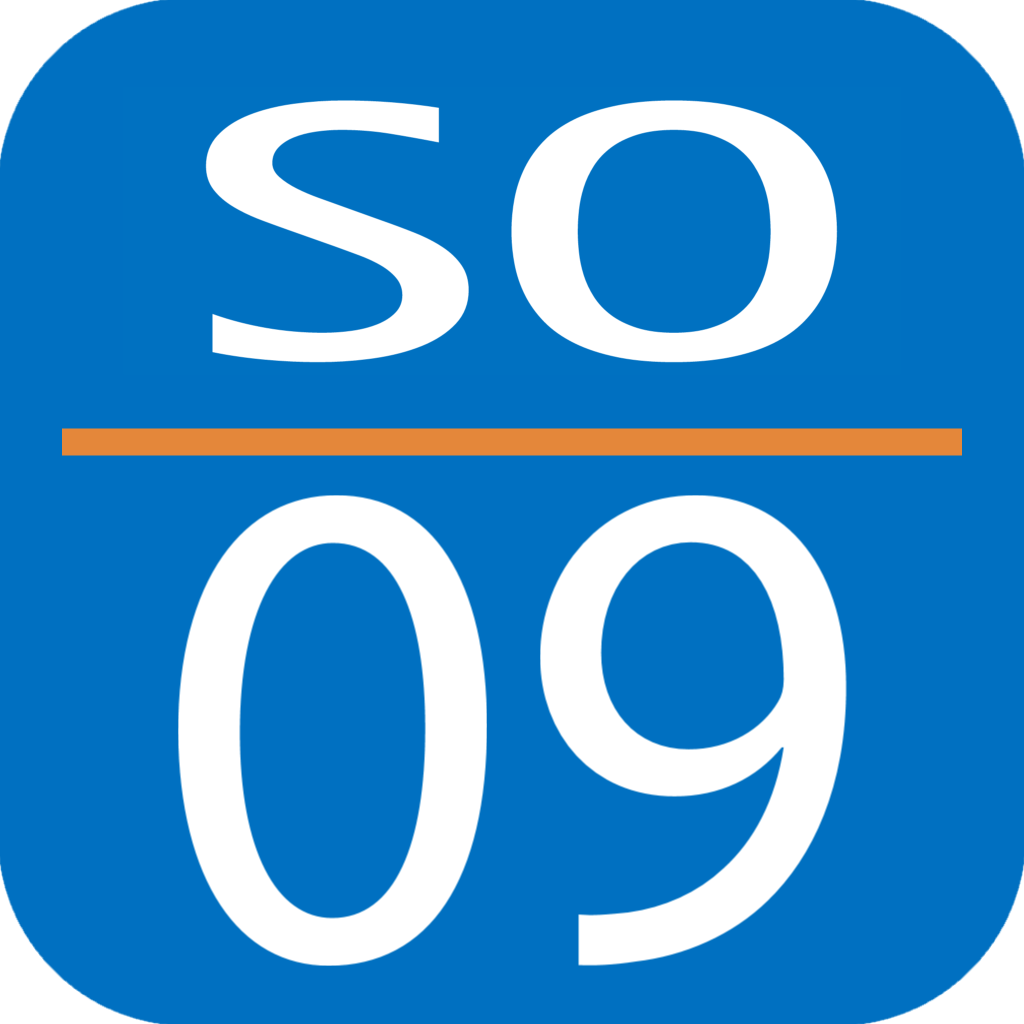
Tsurugamine Station 鶴ケ峰駅

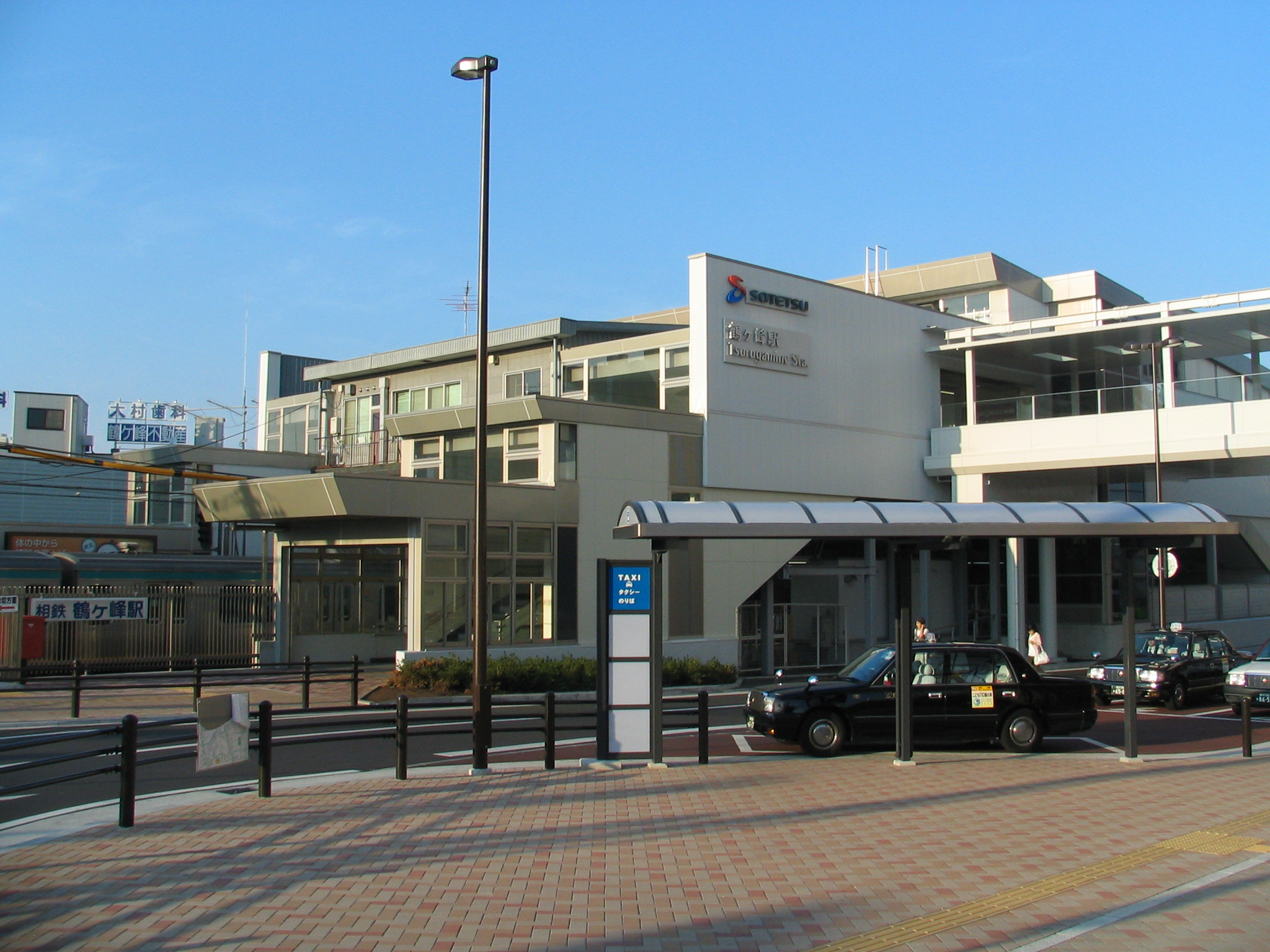
- Tsurugamine Station

General information
- Location: Tsurugamine-chō 2-78, Asahi-ku, Yokohama-shi, Kanagawa-ken 241-0022; Japan
- Coordinates: 35.474895°N 139.549316°E
- Operator: Sagami Railway
- Line: Sotetsu Main Line
- Distance: 8.5 km from Yokohama
- Platforms: 2 side platforms

Other information
- Station code: SO09
- Website: Official website

History
- Opened: 25 October 1930

Passengers
- 2019: 57,068 daily

Services
Preceding station	Sagami Railway	Following station
Futamata-gawa towards Ebina	Sōtetsu Main Line Commuter Express Rapid Local	Nishiya towards Yokohama
Futamata-gawa towards Ebina	Sōtetsu–JR Link Line Local	Nishiya towards Shinjuku
Location
- Location within Kanagawa Prefecture Location within Japan

Tsurugamine Station (鶴ケ峰駅, Tsurugamine-eki) is a passenger railway station located in Asahi-ku, Yokohama, Japan, operated by the private railway operator Sagami Railway (Sotetsu).

== Lines ==
Tsurugamine Station is served by the Sagami Railway Main Line, and lies 8.5 kilometers from the starting point of the line at Yokohama Station.

== Station layout ==
The station consists of two opposed side platforms serving two tracks.

=== Platforms ===
1	■ Sotetsu Main Line	for Futamata-gawa, Yamato, Ebina and (via Izumino Line) Shōnandai
2	■ Sotetsu Main Line	for Yokohama, for Hazawa yokohama-kokudai Through to Saikyō Line for Musashi-Kosugi, Ōsaki, and Shinjuku, Shin-Yokohama and Through to Tōkyū Shin-yokohama Line for Shin-tsunashima and Hiyoshi

== History ==
Tsurugamine Station was opened on 25 October 1930.

== Future plans ==
The station facilities are planned to be transitioned to an underground structure by 2034. The results of the planning process were presented in January 2022, and it was determined that the project will cost ¥78 billion (2021) (equivalent to ¥85 billion or US$563 million in 2024). Construction for the elevation of the 2.8 km (1.7 mi) section of the Sotetsu Main Line began in June 2022.

The goal of the project is to remove 10 level crossings from the main line.

== Gallery ==
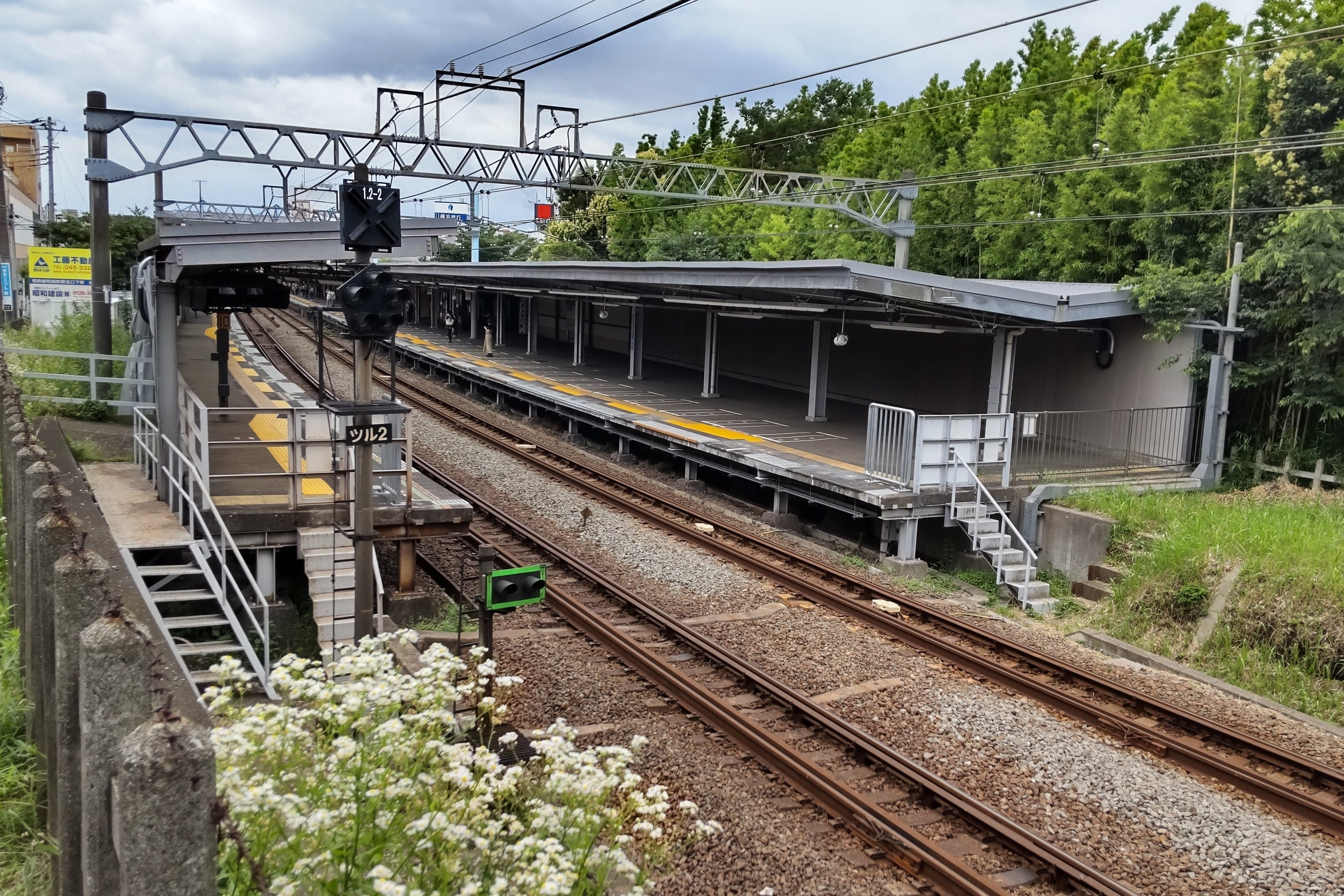
Station platforms in 2021

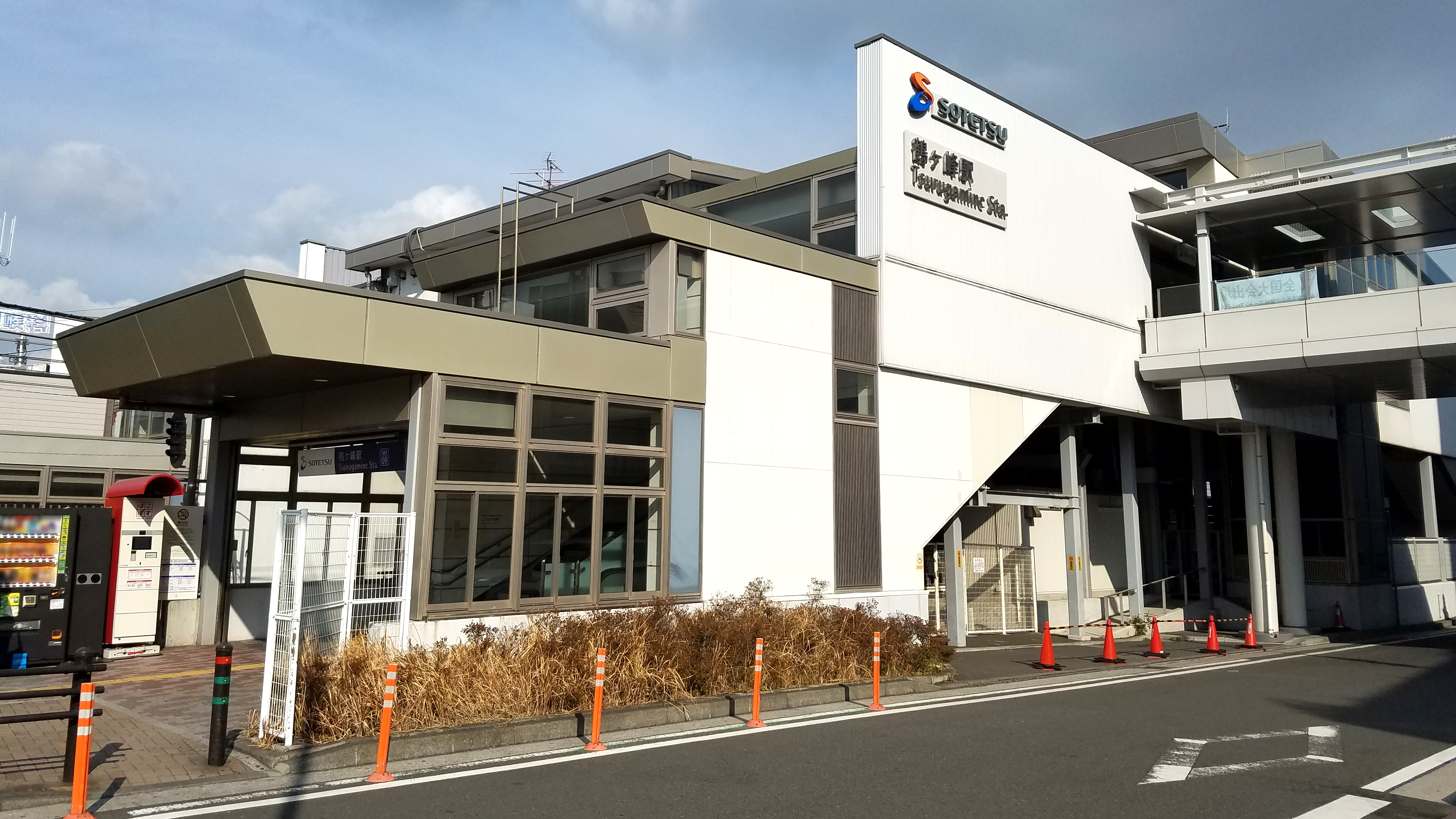
South entrance in 2020

== Passenger statistics ==
In fiscal 2019, the station was used by an average of 57,068 passengers daily.

The passenger figures for previous years are as shown below.

Fiscal year	daily average
2005	53,946
2010	56,455
2015	57,367

== Surrounding area ==
- Asahi Ward Office
- Yokohama City Asahi Library
- Yokohama City Waterworks Bureau Asahi / Seya Service Center
- Asahi Civil Engineering Office
- Resource Recycling Bureau Asahi Office

== See also ==
- List of railway stations in Japan
