= Shin-Yokohama Line =

The Shin-Yokohama Line may refer to either of the following railways in Yokohama, Kanagawa, Japan:

- Tōkyū Shin-Yokohama Line operated by Tōkyū Railways
- Sōtetsu Shin-Yokohama Line operated by Sagami Railway
  - The two lines provide through service at Shin-Yokohama Station.
