= Ōsaki Station =

Railway station in Tokyo, Japan

Coordinates: 35.6197°N 139.72855°E

OSKJY24 JS17 JA08 R08 Ōsaki Station 大崎駅
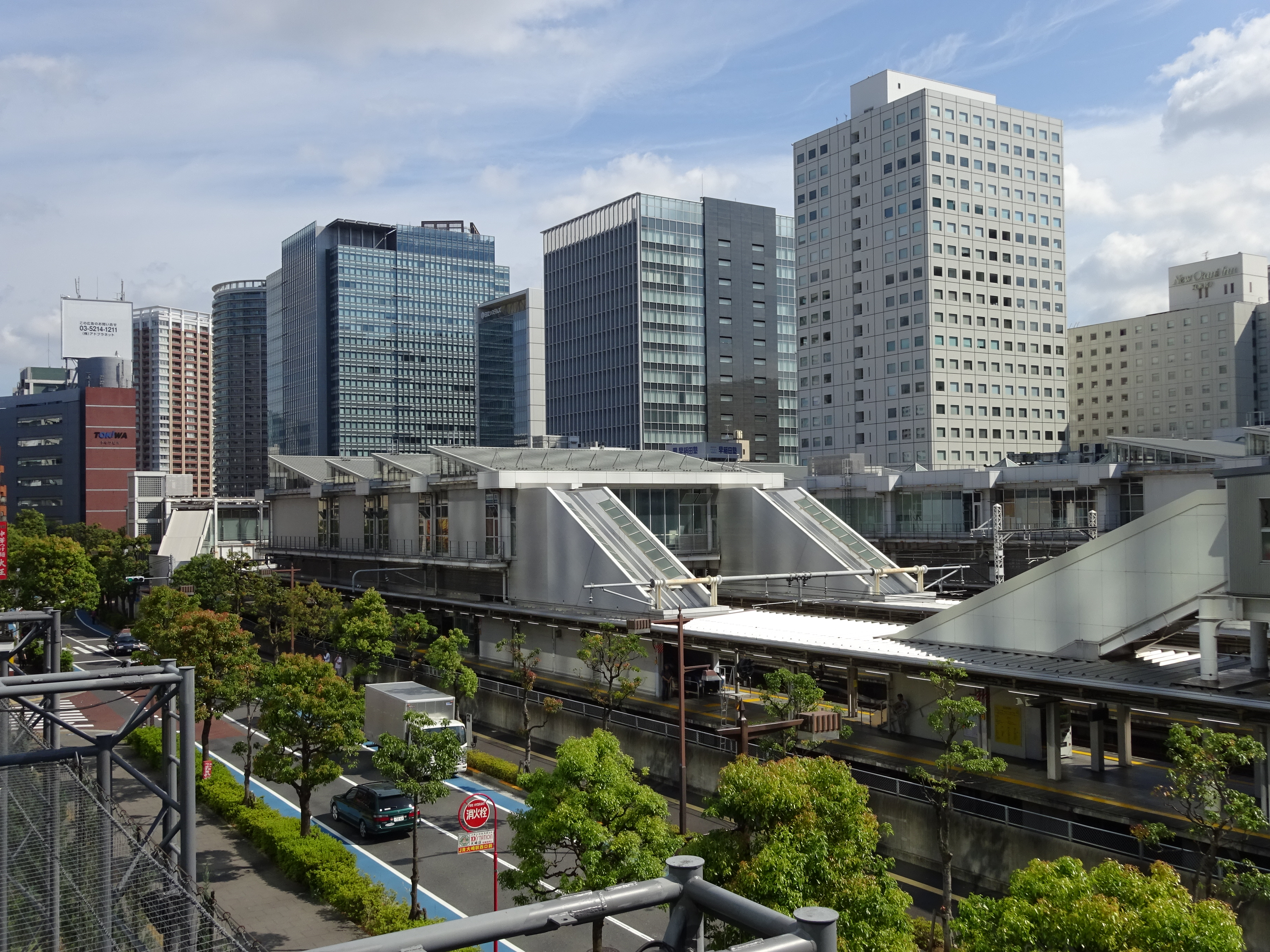
- Ōsaki Station in 2016

General information
- Location: 1-21-4 Ōsaki; Shinagawa, Tokyo; Japan
- Operator: East Japan Railway Company; Tokyo Waterfront Area Rapid Transit
- Lines: Ōsaki Branch Line; Rinkai Line; Yamanote Line
- Distance: 12.2 km (7.6 mi) from Shin-Kiba

Other information
- Station code: OSK; JY24; JS17; JA08; R08

History
- Opened: 25 February 1901; 125 years ago

Passengers
- FY2024: 290,388 (daily) (Note: Data published by the Ministry of Land, Infrastructure, Transport and Tourism state the number of passengers boarding and disembarking by station in a given year. FY2024 covers the period from 1 April 2024 to 31 March 2025. Data published by individual railways directly may state the number boarding only.)

Services
Preceding station	JR East	Following station
Shinagawa Next counter-clockwise	Yamanote Line	Gotanda JY23 Next clockwise
Fujisawa JT08 towards Odawara	Shōnan	Shibuya towards Shinjuku
Musashi-Kosugi towards Odawara	Shōnan–Shinjuku Line Special Rapid Rapid	Shibuya towards Takasaki
Nishi-Ōi JS16 towards Zushi	Shōnan–Shinjuku Line Rapid Local	Ebisu towards Maebashi or Utsunomiya
through to Sōtetsu–JR Link Line & Rinkai Line	Saikyō Line Commuter Rapid Rapid Local	Ebisu towards Ōmiya
Nishi-Oi JS16 towards Ebina	Sōtetsu–JR Link Line	Ebisu towards Shinjuku
Preceding station	Tokyo Waterfront Area Rapid Transit	Following station
through to Saikyō Line	Rinkai Line	Ōimachi R07 towards Shin-Kiba
Location
- Location within Tokyo Yamanote Loop Location within Tokyo wards area Location within Japan

Ōsaki Station (Japanese: 大崎駅, Hepburn: Ōsaki-eki) is a railway station in Shinagawa, Tokyo, Japan, jointly owned and operated by East Japan Railway Company (JR East) and Tokyo Waterfront Area Rapid Transit (TWR).

== Station layout ==
Ōsaki Station is served by six passenger services: the Yamanote Line, Shōnan–Shinjuku Line, Saikyō Line, Shōnan limited express, Rinkai Line, and Sōtetsu–JR Link Line. Most Saikyō Line trains operate through to the Rinkai Line or the Sōtetsu–JR Link Line.

The station's railway infrastructure comprises the Rinkai Line, Yamanote Line, and Ōsaki Branch Line. The Yamanote Freight Line passes through the station, while the Ōsaki Branch Line provides a connection between the Yamanote Freight Line and the Hinkaku Line, which passes near the station. The Saikyō, Shōnan–Shinjuku, Shōnan, and Sōtetsu–JR Link services use the Yamanote Freight Line and associated connecting infrastructure.

The station has four island platforms serving eight tracks. Platforms 1 to 4 serve the Yamanote Line, platforms 5 and 8 serve the Ōsaki Branch Line and platforms 6 and 7 serve the Rinkai Line.

Ōsaki is one of the stations on the Yamanote Line loop where trains enter and leave passenger service. The station therefore has four Yamanote Line tracks, with two in each direction, allowing trains to enter or leave service without interfering with trains continuing around the loop. Platforms 1 and 3 are normally used by through services, while platforms 2 and 4 are used by trains entering or leaving service. Chest-high platform screen doors were introduced on platforms 1 and 3 from 22 December 2012.

The station has two sets of ticket gates, designated the north and south gates. The north gates provide access to the east and west exits, while the south gates provide access to the New East and New West exits.

Unlike stations where services operated by different railway companies have separate fare areas, JR East and the Rinkai Line share the same fare gates at Ōsaki. Passengers can therefore transfer between the two without exiting the fare area. Passengers using Suica or another IC card are charged the applicable combined fare when they exit the station.

=== Platforms ===
1-2	Yamanote Line	Counter-clockwise for Shinagawa and Tokyo
3-4	Yamanote Line	Clockwise for Shibuya, Shinjuku, and Ikebukuro
5	Shōnan-Shinjuku Line	for Musashi-Kosugi, Yokohama, Ōfuna, Odawara, and Zushi
5	■ Through to Sōtetsu Shin-Yokohama Line	for Musashi-Kosugi, Hazawa yokohama-kokudai Sotetsu Line for Nishiya and Ebina
5	Rinkai Line	for Kokusai-Tenjijō and Shin-Kiba
6-7	Saikyō Line	for Shinjuku, Ikebukuro, Ōmiya and Kawagoe
6-7	Rinkai Line	for Kokusai-Tenjijō and Shin-Kiba
8	Saikyō Line	for Shinjuku, Ikebukuro, Ōmiya and Kawagoe
8	Shōnan-Shinjuku Line	for Shinjuku, Ōmiya, Takasaki and Utsunomiya

=== Facilities ===
The station has a "Midori no Madoguchi" staffed ticket office. Toilet facilities are located inside the ticket barriers, close to the north gate.

Track layout around Ōsaki Station
	Hinkaku Line (Yokosuka Line) to Nishi-Ōi
Rinkai Line to Shin-Kiba		Yamanote Line to Shibuya
	Hinkaku Line (Yokosuka Line) to Shinagawa; Yamanote Line to Shinagawa

== History ==
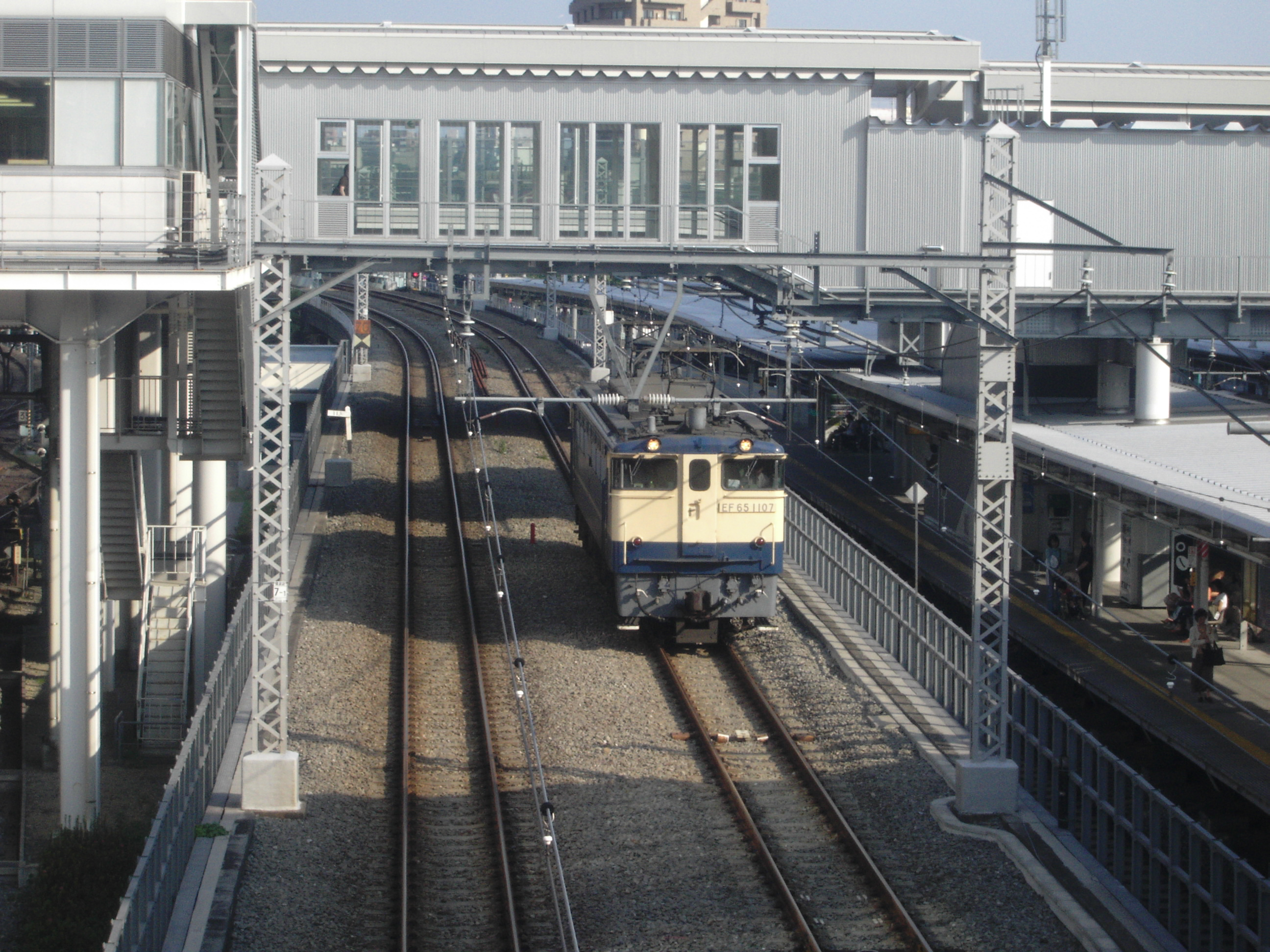
A single locomotive on the Yamanote Freight Line between the Yamanote Line and the Rinkai Line platforms, May 2006

The station opened on 25 February 1901, as a station of Nippon Railway, which was nationalized in 1906. After serving the Yamanote Line for a century, on 1 December 2002, new platforms for the Saikyō Line, the Rinkai Line and the Shōnan-Shinjuku Line opened on the west side of the station.

Station numbering was introduced to the Rinkai Line platforms in 2016 with Ōsaki being assigned station number R08. Later in August 2016, station numbering was introduced to the JR East platforms with Osaki being assigned station numbers JS17 for the Shonan-Shinjuku Line, JA08 for the Saikyo Line, and JY24 for the Yamanote Line. At the same time, JR East assigned its major transfer stations in the Tokyo area a 3-letter code; Osaki was assigned the code "OSK".

== Passenger statistics ==
In fiscal 2013, the JR East station was used by an average of 143,397 passengers daily (boarding passengers only), making it the eighteenth-busiest station operated by JR East. In fiscal 2013, the TWR station was used by an average of 58,041 people daily (boarding passengers only), making it the busiest station operated by TWR. The average boarding passenger figures for previous years are as shown below.

Fiscal year	JR East	TWR
2000	57,101	
2005	93,709	
2010	126,436	
2011	127,838	49,835
2012	138,311	55,666
2013	143,397	58,041

== Surrounding area ==
- Sumitomo Fudosan Osaki Garden Tower
  - Sega Sammy Headquarters
- Gate City Ohsaki
  - Lawson Headquarters
  - Adobe Systems Japan Headquarters
- ThinkPark Tower
  - MOS Burger Headquarters

== See also ==
- List of railway stations in Japan
