= Sōtetsu–JR Link Line =

Railway service in Japan

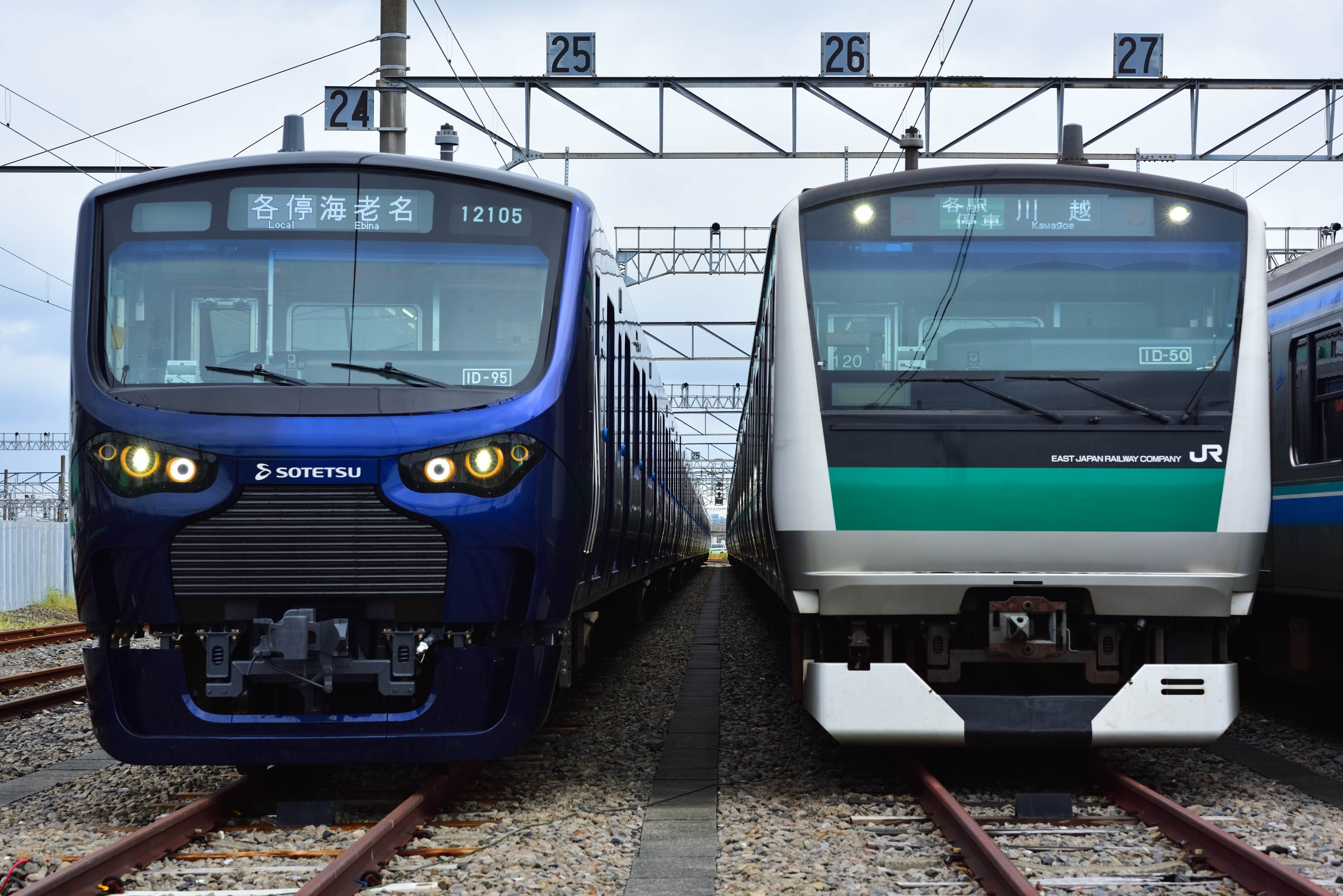
- Sotetsu 12000 series and E233-7000 series in 2019

Overview
- Native name: 相鉄・JR直通線
- Status: Operational
- Owner: JRTT; Sagami Railway; JR East
- Locale: Tokyo, Kanagawa prefectures
- Termini: Shinjuku; Ebina
- Stations: 18

Service
- Depots: Kashiwadai (Sotetsu); Kawagoe (JR East)

History
- Opened: 30 November 2019; 6 years ago

Technical
- Line length: 57 km (35 mi)
- Track gauge: 1,067 mm (3 ft 6 in)
- Electrification: 1,500 V DC overhead catenary
- Operating speed: 120 km/h (75 mph)

The Sōtetsu–JR Link Line (Japanese: 相鉄・JR直通線, Hepburn: Sōtetsu JR Chokutsū-sen) is a section of the Eastern Kanagawa Rail Link project which connects the Sōtetsu Main Line to the JR East Saikyō Line via the tracks of the Sōtetsu Shin-Yokohama Line and the Tōkaidō Freight Line. It was constructed and is owned by the Japan Railway Construction, Transport and Technology Agency (JRTT). The service and operations are publicly described as Through service to Sōtetsu Line (相鉄線直通, Sōtetsu Chokutsū-sen) by JR East_{,} and as Thru to JR Line (JR線直数運転, JR-sen Chokutsū Unten) by Sagami Railway (Sotetsu).

== History ==
=== Past proposals ===
Past proposals also suggested Sōtetsu trains operate through services with the Ueno-Tokyo Line, towards the Utsunomiya, Takasaki and Jōban Lines. This would have required trains to cross over level junctions to enter the Tōkaido Line tracks near Tsurumi or Shinagawa (or somewhere in between), which would have possibly undermined the high-density train operations in this section, if no dedicated grade separation were to be built. Thus, the idea was scrapped due to these difficulties.

== Services ==
JR through service trains enter the Tōkaido Freight Line once leaving Hazawa Yokohama-Kokudai Station, via the Tokyo side of Yokohama-Hazawa Freight Station, then enter the Yokosuka Line tracks near Tsurumi Station. The service shares the same route as the Shōnan–Shinjuku Line, heading inbound towards Musashi-Kosugi, Ōsaki, Shibuya, and Shinjuku.

Trains operate from Ebina on the Sōtetsu Main Line via Nishiya and Musashi-Kosugi, and enter the Saikyō Line at Ōsaki. Trains generally terminate at Shinjuku. During the morning rush hour, some trains go further north towards Musashi-Urawa, Ōmiya, Sashiōgi (where the Kawagoe Line depot is located), and as far as Kawagoe. A total of 46 round trips are operated every day, with a rush hour frequency of 4 trains per hour, and off-peak frequency of 2–3 trains per hour.

The fastest travel times are 44 minutes between Futamatagawa and Shinjuku, 45 minutes between Yamato and Shibuya, and 36 minutes between Ebina and Musashi-Kosugi.

=== Service types ===
- Local (各停), stopping at all stations
- Limited Express (特急), stopping at all stations on the JR lines.
  - However, when Limited Express trains are on the JR line, they are displayed as Local instead.

== Nomenclature ==
		Ebina Station	...	Futamatagawa Station	...	Nishiya Station	Hazawa yokohama-kokudai Station	Tsurumi Station	Shin-Tsurumi Signal Station	...	Ōsaki Station	Shinjuku Station
Line name in passenger info	→	Through service to JR Saikyo Line						Through service to Saikyo (Kawagoe) Line				Saikyo (Kawagoe) Line
Line name in passenger info	←	Sotetsu Lines						Through service to Sotetsu Lines				Through service to Saikyo Line Sotetsu Line
Official route name		Sotetsu Main Line					Sotetsu Shin-Yokohama Line	Tōkaidō Main Line				Yamanote Line
Track name		Sotetsu Main Line					Sotetsu Shin-Yokohama Line	Tokaido Freight Line	Hinkaku Line			Yamanote Freight Line

== Station list ==
Company	Line name	No.	Station	Japanese	Transfers	Location	
Through service to Ōmiya, Kawagoe on Saikyō Line and ■ Kawagoe Line
JR East	Yamanote Line		Shinjuku	新宿	Yamanote Line (JY17); Chūō Line (JC05); Chūō–Sōbu Line (JB10); Saikyō Line (JA11; for Itabashi & Ōmiya); Shōnan–Shinjuku Line (JS20; for Utsunomiya/Takasaki); Keiō Line/Keio New Line (KO01); Odawara Line (OH01); Shinjuku Line (Seibu-Shinjuku: SS01); Marunouchi Line (M-08); Shinjuku Line (S-01); Ōedo Line (E-27, Shinjuku-Nishiguchi: E-01)	Shinjuku	Tokyo
JR East	Yamanote Line		Shinjuku	新宿	Yamanote Line (JY17); Chūō Line (JC05); Chūō–Sōbu Line (JB10); Saikyō Line (JA11; for Itabashi & Ōmiya); Shōnan–Shinjuku Line (JS20; for Utsunomiya/Takasaki); Keiō Line/Keio New Line (KO01); Odawara Line (OH01); Shinjuku Line (Seibu-Shinjuku: SS01); Marunouchi Line (M-08); Shinjuku Line (S-01); Ōedo Line (E-27, Shinjuku-Nishiguchi: E-01)	Shibuya	Tokyo
JR East	Yamanote Line		Shibuya	渋谷	Yamanote Line (JY20); Shōnan–Shinjuku Line (JS19); Tōyoko Line (TY01); Den-en-toshi Line (DT01); Inokashira Line (IN01); Ginza Line (G-01); Hanzōmon Line (Z-01); Fukutoshin Line (F-16)	Shibuya	Tokyo
JR East	Yamanote Line		Ebisu	恵比寿	Yamanote Line (JY21); Shōnan–Shinjuku Line (JS18); Hibiya Line (H-02)	Shibuya	Tokyo
JR East	Yamanote Line	OSKJS17 JA08	Ōsaki	大崎	Yamanote Line (JY24); Shōnan–Shinjuku Line (JS17); Rinkai Line (R-08)	Shinagawa	Tokyo
JR East	Tōkaidō Main Line	JS16	Nishi-Ōi	西大井	Tōkaidō Main Line; Yokosuka Line (JO16; for Shinagawa); Shōnan–Shinjuku Line (JS16)	Shinagawa	Tokyo
JR East	Tōkaidō Main Line		Musashi-Kosugi	武蔵小杉	Tōkaidō Main Line; Yokosuka Line (JO15; for Yokohama & Zushi); Shōnan–Shinjuku Line (JS15; for Yokohama & Zushi/Odawara); Nambu Line (JN07); Tōyoko Line (TY11); Meguro Line (MG11)	Nakahara-ku, Kawasaki	Kanagawa
JR East	Tōkaidō Main Line	SO-51	Hazawa Yokohama-Kokudai	羽沢横浜国大	Sōtetsu Shin-Yokohama Line (SO51; for Shin-Yokohama)	Kanagawa-ku, Yokohama	Kanagawa
Sagami Railway (Sotetsu)	Sōtetsu Shin-Yokohama Line	SO-51	Hazawa Yokohama-Kokudai	羽沢横浜国大		Kanagawa-ku, Yokohama	Kanagawa
Sagami Railway (Sotetsu)	Sōtetsu Shin-Yokohama Line	SO-08	Nishiya	西谷	Sōtetsu Main Line (SO08; for Yokohama); Sōtetsu Shin-Yokohama Line	Hodogaya-ku, Yokohama	Kanagawa
Sagami Railway (Sotetsu)	Sōtetsu Main Line	SO-08	Nishiya	西谷	Sōtetsu Main Line (SO08; for Yokohama); Sōtetsu Shin-Yokohama Line	Hodogaya-ku, Yokohama	Kanagawa
Sagami Railway (Sotetsu)	Sōtetsu Main Line	SO-10	Futamatagawa	二俣川	Sōtetsu Main Line; Sōtetsu Izumino Line (SO10)	Asahi-ku, Yokohama	Kanagawa
Sagami Railway (Sotetsu)	Sōtetsu Main Line	SO-14	Yamato	大和	Sōtetsu Main Line; Enoshima Line (OE05)	Yamato	Kanagawa
Sagami Railway (Sotetsu)	Sōtetsu Main Line	SO-18	Ebina	海老名	Sōtetsu Main Line; Odawara Line (OH32); ■ Sagami Line	Ebina	Kanagawa
