= Nishiya Station =

Railway station in Yokohama, Japan

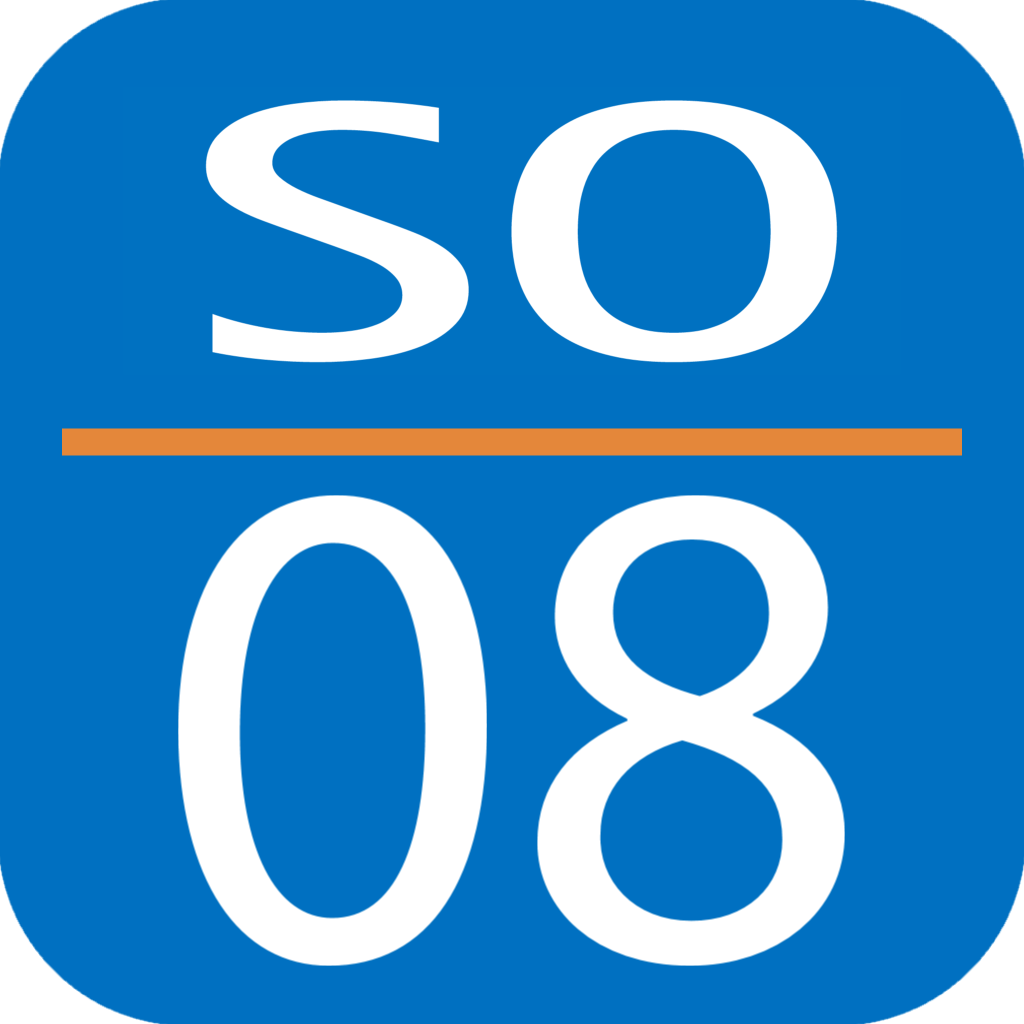
Nishiya Station 西谷駅

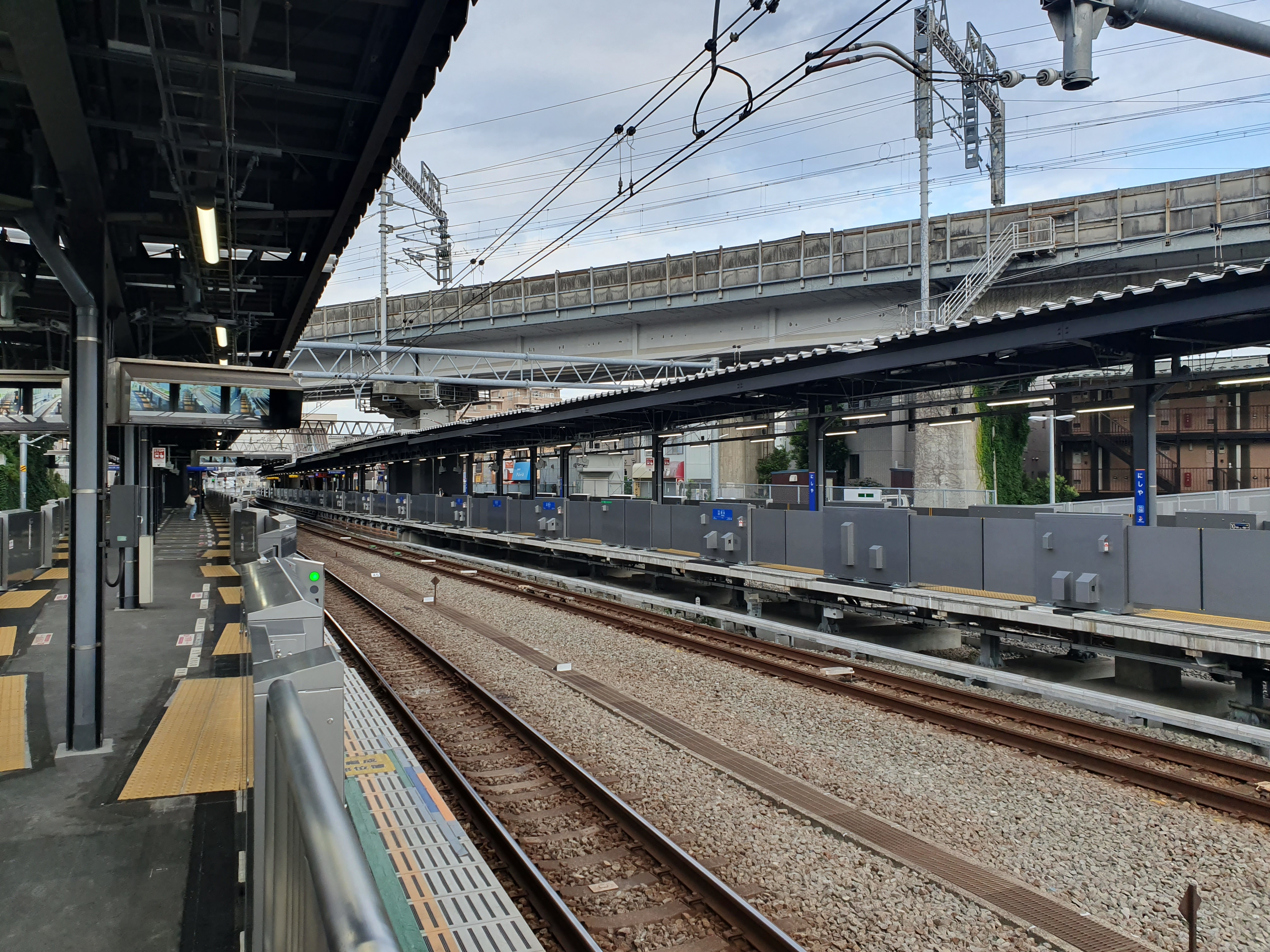
- Platforms of the Sōtetsu Shin-yokohama Line in June 2021

General information
- Location: 1101 Nishiya-chō, Hodogaya-ku, Yokohama-shi, Kanagawa-ken 240-0054; Japan
- Coordinates: 35.477997°N 139.565683°E
- Operator: Sagami Railway
- Lines: ■ Sōtetsu Main Line; ■ Sōtetsu Shin-yokohama Line
- Distance: 6.9 km from Yokohama
- Platforms: 2 island platforms
- Tracks: 4 tracks

Other information
- Station code: SO08
- Website: Official website

History
- Opened: 1 December 1926
- Rebuilt: 30 November 2019

Passengers
- FY2019: 24,550 daily

Services
Preceding station	Sagami Railway	Following station
Futamata-gawa towards Ebina	Sōtetsu Main Line Limited Express	Yokohama Terminus
Tsurugamine towards Ebina	Sōtetsu Main Line Commuter Express	Yokohama Terminus
Tsurugamine towards Ebina	Sōtetsu Main Line Rapid	Hoshikawa towards Yokohama
Tsurugamine towards Ebina	Sōtetsu Main Line Local	Kami-Hoshikawa towards Yokohama
through to Sotetsu Main Line	Sōtetsu Shin-Yokohama Line	Hazawa yokohama-kokudai towards Shin-yokohama
Futamata-gawa towards Ebina	Sōtetsu–JR Link Line Limited Express	Hazawa yokohama-kokudai towards Shinjuku
Tsurugamine towards Ebina	Sōtetsu–JR Link Line Local	Hazawa yokohama-kokudai towards Shinjuku
Location
- Location within Kanagawa Prefecture Location within Japan

Nishiya Station (西谷駅, Nishiya-eki) is a junction passenger railway station located in Hodogaya-ku, Yokohama, Kanagawa Prefecture, Japan, operated by the private railway operator Sagami Railway (Sotetsu).

== Lines ==
Nishiya Station is served by the Sōtetsu Main Line, and is located 6.9 km (4.3 mi) from the terminus of the line at Yokohama Station. It is also a station on the Sōtetsu Shin-yokohama Line.

== Station layout ==
The station consists of two island platforms serving four tracks, connected to the station building by a footbridge.

=== Platforms ===
1-2	Sōtetsu Main Line	for Futamata-gawa, Yamato, and Ebina; Sōtetsu Izumino Line for Shōnandai
3	Sōtetsu Main Line	for Yokohama
4	Sōtetsu Shin-yokohama Line	for Hazawa yokohama-kokudai Through to Saikyō Line for Musashi-Kosugi, Ōsaki, and Shinjuku; Through to Tōkyū Shin-yokohama Line for Shin-tsunashima and Hiyoshi

== History ==
Nishiya Station opened on 1 December 1926.

=== Developments ===
The Eastern Kanagawa Rail Link is an approximately 10 km link, which is operated from Nishiya to Hiyoshi via Hazawa Yokohama-Kokudai and Shin-yokohama, that enables through services between the JR East Saikyō Line and the Sōtetsu Main Line as of 30 November 2019. Through service between the Tōkyū Tōyoko Line, the Tōkyū Meguro Line and the Sōtetsu Main Line began on 18 March 2023. All Limited Express and Rapid trains stop at Nishiya as a result.

== Passenger statistics ==
In fiscal 2019, the station was used by an average of 24,550 passengers daily.

The passenger figures for previous years are as shown below.

Fiscal year	daily average
2005	25,636
2010	23,930
2015	23,398

== Surrounding area ==
- Japan National Route 16
- Senmarudai housing complex
- Sasayama housing complex

== See also ==
- List of railway stations in Japan
