= Hazawa Yokohama-Kokudai Station =

Railway station in Yokohama, Japan

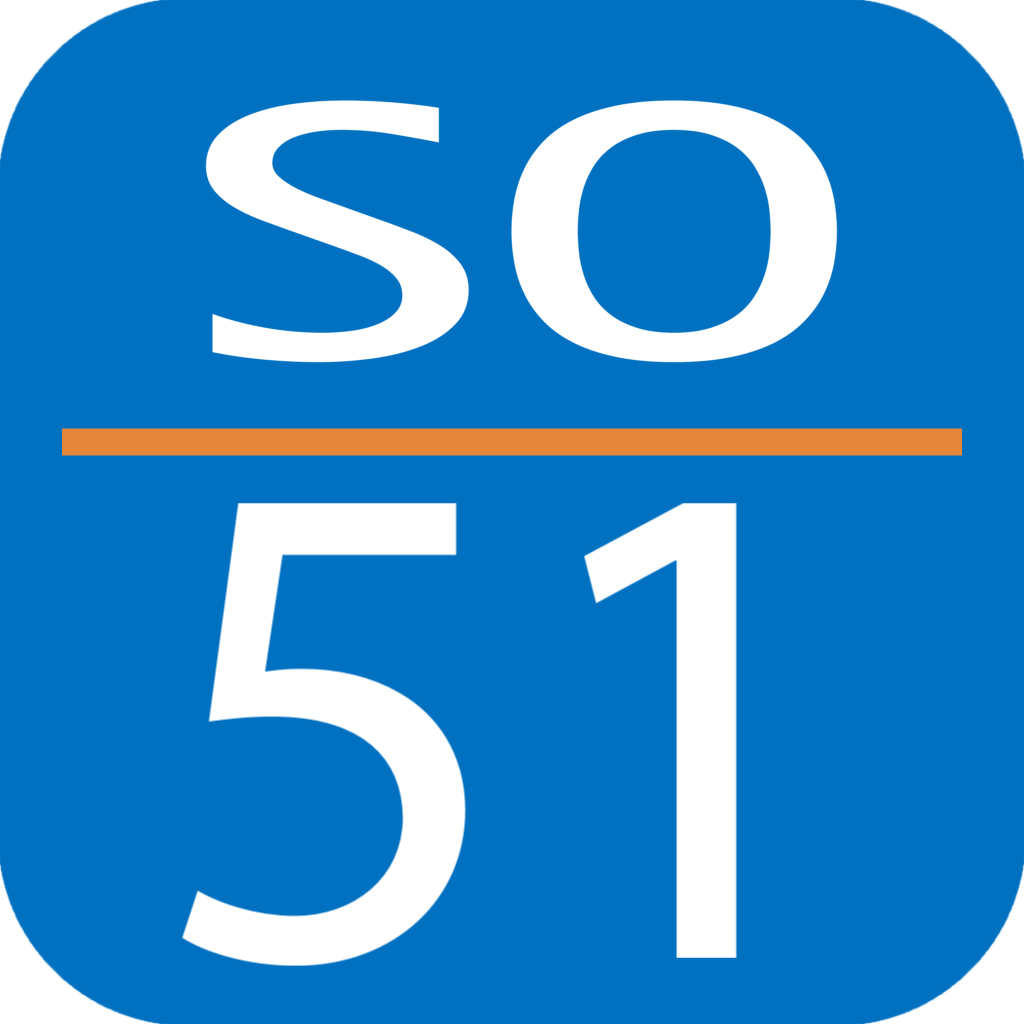
Hazawa Yokohama-Kokudai Station 羽沢横浜国大駅

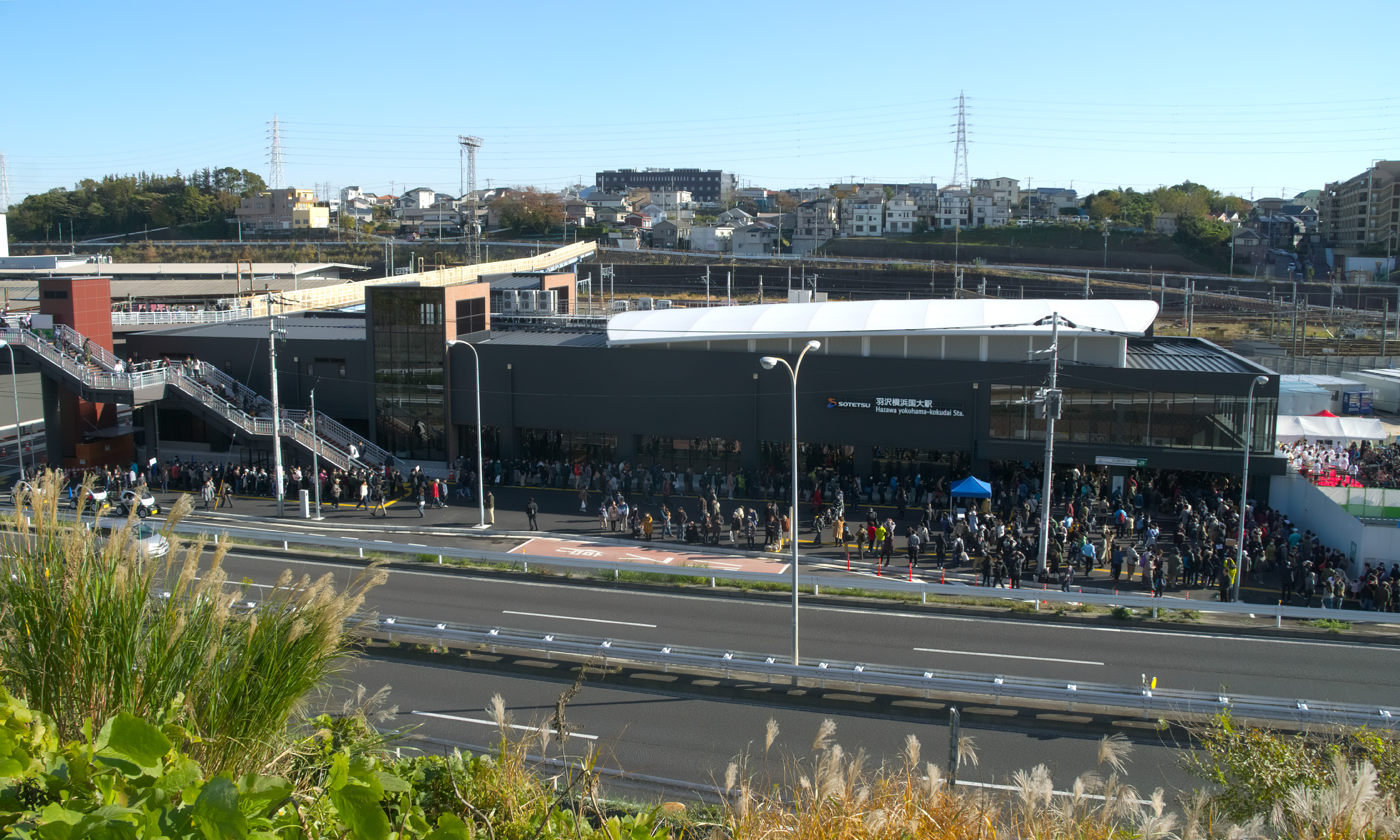
- Station building on its opening day, 30 November 2019

General information
- Location: 2-Chōme, Hazawa-Minami; Kanagawa, Yokohama; Japan
- Coordinates: 35°28′53″N 139°35′11″E
- Operator: Sagami Railway
- Lines: Sōtetsu Shin-Yokohama Line; Tōkaidō Freight Line
- Platforms: 2 side platforms
- Tracks: 2

Construction
- Structure type: Underground

Other information
- Station code: SO51

History
- Opened: 30 November 2019

Services
Preceding station	Sagami Railway	Following station
Nishiya towards Ebina	Sōtetsu–JR Link Line Limited Express Local	Musashi-Kosugi towards Shinjuku
Nishiya Terminus	Sōtetsu Shin-Yokohama Line	Shin-Yokohama Terminus
Location

Hazawa Yokohama-Kokudai Station (羽沢横浜国大駅, Hazawa yokohama-kokudai-eki) is a railway station on the Sōtetsu Shin-Yokohama Line and Tōkaidō Freight Line operated by East Japan Railway Company (JR East). It is located in the Kanagawa ward of the city of Yokohama in Kanagawa Prefecture. This station is operated by Sōtetsu (Sagami Railway), with station number SO51.

== History ==
=== Chronology ===
- 11 December 2017: Sōtetsu finalised the station name as Hazawa Yokohama-Kokudai Station. However, as of that time the route name was still provisional. The station's name comes from its locale, Hazawa (羽沢), and also its neighbouring university, the Yokohama National University, or in Japanese, Yokohama Kokudai (横浜国大).
- 30 November 2019: Opening of the Sōtetsu JR Link Line.
- 18 March 2023: Opening of the Sōtetsu Shin-yokohama Line extension towards Shin-yokohama.
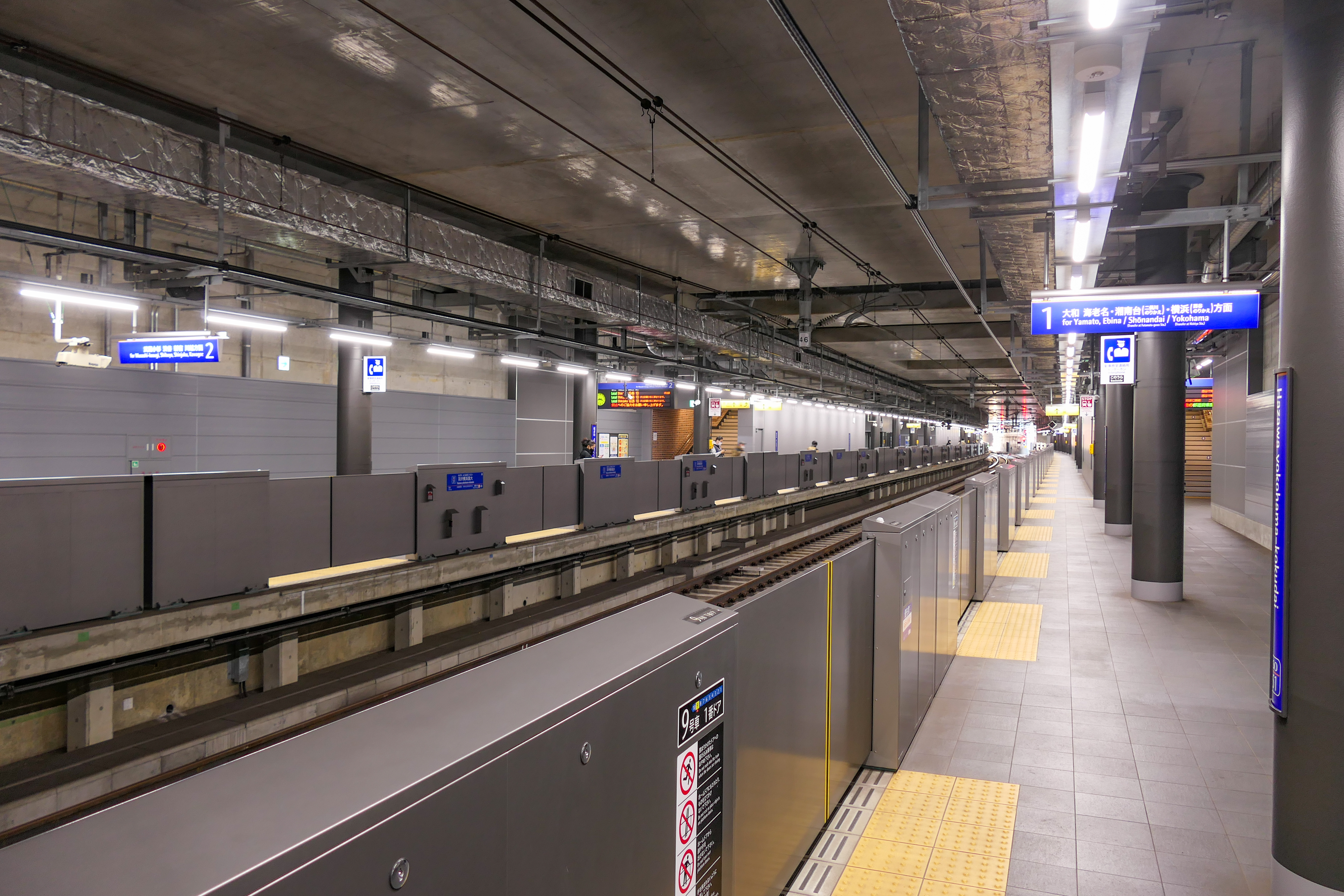
Platforms 1 and 2

== Station layout ==
The station consists of two underground side platforms. At the east side of the station, the tracks for the JR Link Line and the Tōkyū Link Line diverge, with the JR Link Line converging with the Tōkaidō Freight Line after leaving the junction.

=== Platforms ===
1
Sōtetsu Shin-Yokohama Line
for Nishiya and Futamata-gawa
2
Through to Saikyō Line
for Musashi-Kosugi, Ōsaki, and Shinjuku
(some trains for Kawagoe)
Sōtetsu Shin-Yokohama Line
for Shin-Yokohama, through to Tōkyū Shin-Yokohama Line for Shin-Tsunashima and Hiyoshi

Upbound through services via Tōyoko Line:
Tōyoko Line for Musashi-Kosugi and Shibuya
Fukutoshin Line for Shinjuku-sanchōme, Ikebukuro, Kotake-mukaihara and Wakōshi
Tōjō Line for Kawagoeshi, Shinrinkōen and Ogawamachi

Upbound through services via Meguro Line:
Meguro Line for Musashi-Kosugi and Meguro
Mita Line for Nishi-takashimadaira
Namboku Line for Akabane-iwabuchi
Saitama Railway Line for Urawa-misono

== Surrounding area ==
- JR Freight Yokohama-Hazawa Station (Freight Station of the Tōkaidō Freight Line)
- Daisan Keihin Road
  - Hazawa Interchange
  - Hodogaya Parking Area
  - Hodogaya Toll Gate
- Sagawa Express North Yokohama Branch
- Yokohama National University Tokiwadai Campus
- Tokiwadai Hospital
- JCHO Yokohama Hodogaya Central Hospital

== See also ==
- List of railway stations in Japan
