= Sōtetsu Shin-Yokohama Line =

Railway line in Kanagawa Prefecture, Japan

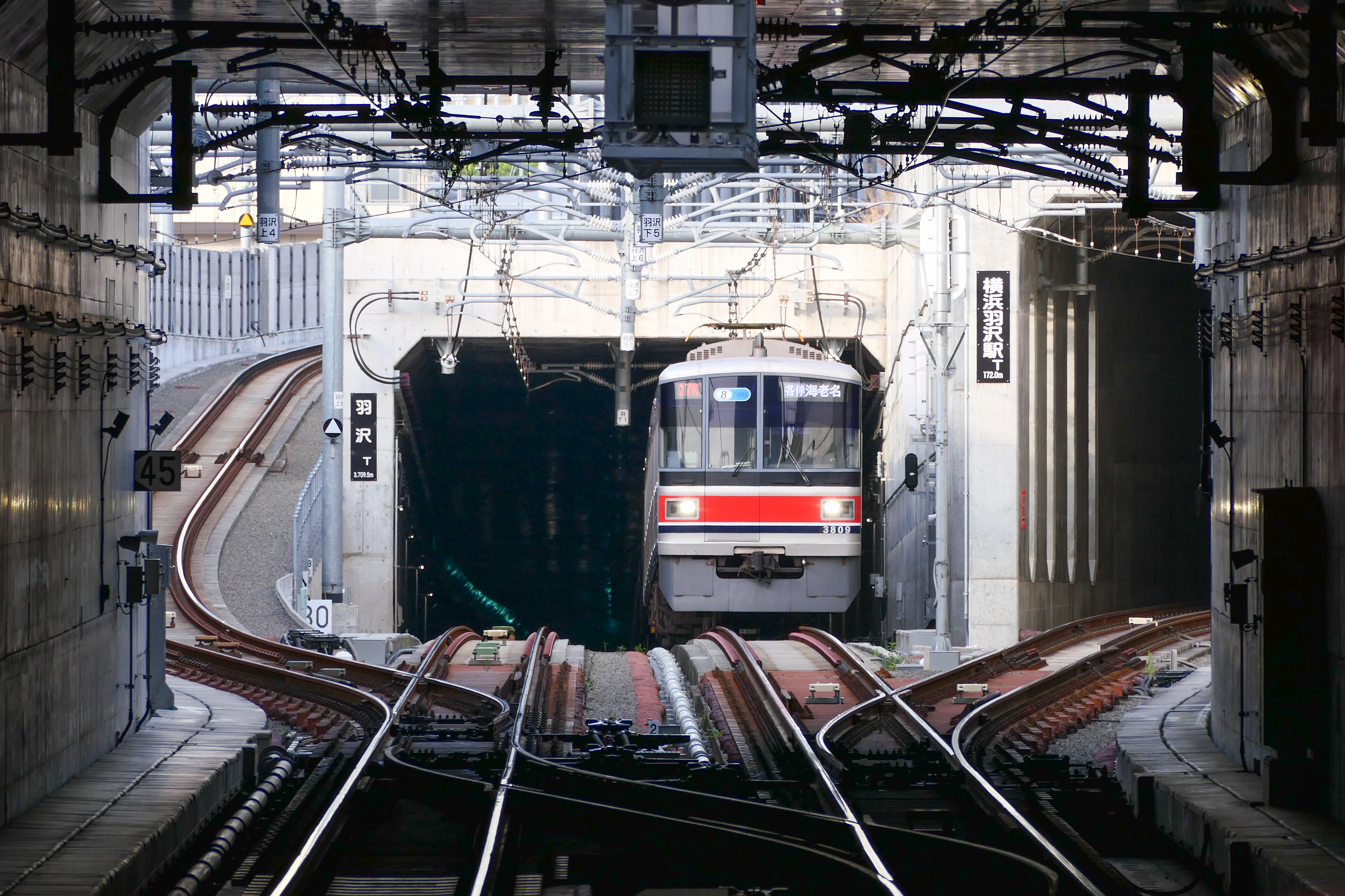
- A Tōkyū train for Ebina Station passing the junction point of the Sōtetsu Shin-Yokohama Line and the Sōtetsu–JR Link Line at Hazawa Yokohama-Kokudai Station

Overview
- Native name: 相鉄新横浜線
- Status: Operational
- Owner: Japan Railway Construction, Transport and Technology Agency
- Locale: Yokohama, Kanagawa, Japan
- Termini: Nishiya; Shin-yokohama
- Stations: 3

Service
- Operator(s): Sagami Railway

History
- Opened: 30 November 2019 (Nishiya - Hazawa Yokohama-Kokudai); 18 March 2023 (Hazawa Yokohama-Kokudai - Shin-yokohama)

Technical
- Line length: 6.3 km (3.9 mi)
- Number of tracks: 2
- Track gauge: 1067 mm
- Electrification: Overhead catenary 1,500 V DC

The Sōtetsu Shin-Yokohama Line is a commuter line operated by Sotetsu between Nishiya Station on the Sōtetsu Main Line to Shin-Yokohama Station. Sōtetsu has put its company names as a formal part of the line names, which is a first for the company.

It is a part of the Eastern Kanagawa Rail Link strategic plan for improving the rail network connectivity of Kanagawa Prefecture. The rail infrastructures of this line are maintained by the Japan Railway Construction, Transport and Technology Agency (JRTT). Sōtetsu collects the operation revenue and pays JRTT for using the rail infrastructures, then JRTT use this payment to maintain the infrastructures and reimburse the loan for the construction of this line.

The Sōtetsu Shin-Yokohama Line opened on 30 November 2019 and the extension to Shin-Yokohama opened on 18 March 2023.

== Summary ==
Sōtetsu Main Line and Sōtetsu Izumino Line trains operates through services with JR East via Hazawa Yokohama Kokudai; and planned through service with Tōkyū, Toei Subway Lines via Hiyoshi. The former is named the Sōtetsu JR Link Line. Moreover, Sōtetsu has been promoting the project as the "Metropolitan Through Service Project" (都心直通プロジェクト), as the link will enable connection from eastern Kanagawa into central Tokyo, and further north towards Saitama.

The new facilities at Shin-Yokohama Station are jointly operated by Sōtetsu and Tōkyū. This is the first case for both operators to have a station with direct connections to the Shinkansen.

== Routes and services ==
=== Through service to/from Tōkyū ===
Tōkyū through service trains enter the Tōkyū Line network from Shin-Yokohama, and continue towards Shibuya via the Tōkyū Tōyoko Line or Meguro via Tōkyū Meguro Line. Trains from Ebina run to the Meguro Line as express trains, while trains from Shōnandai station on the Izumino Line run onto the Toyoko Line.

Sōtetsu has introduced its 20000 series which is to be used in Tōkyū through services, and has been in service since February 2018. The 20000 series will be produced in 10-car sets and 8-cars, with the 10-car sets not entering the Tōkyū Meguro Line and the Toei Mita Line. Moreover, the 20000 series is not intended to be used on JR through services.

The station numbers for the Sōtetsu Shin-Yokohama Line's Shin-Yokohama station was revealed on 16 September 2022.

As of November 2022, various trainsets from Sōtetsu, Tōkyū, Tokyo Metro, Toei, and Tōbu have been conducting tests along the now completed segment of this line and the Tōkyū Shin-Yokohama Line between Hiyoshi and Hazawa Yokohama-Kokudai.

On 16 December 2022, Sōtetsu, Tōkyū, and the Japan Railway Construction, Transport and Technology Agency announced that the Sōtetsu Shin-Yokohama Line's extension to Shin-yokohama will open on 18 March 2023. The Shin-Yokohama Line opened as scheduled on 18 March 2023, providing through service between Shin-yokohama and Hiyoshi.

== Station list ==
- All stations are located in Yokohama, Kanagawa Prefecture

Station no.	Station name		Distance		Interchange	Location
Station no.	English	Japanese	Between stations	Total	Interchange	Location
↑ Through-running to/from ↑: Sōtetsu Main Line for Ebina; Sōtetsu Izumino Line for Shōnandai (via Futamata-gawa on Sōtetsu Main Line)
	Nishiya	西谷	-	0.0	Sōtetsu Main Line (SO08; for Hoshikawa and Yokohama)	Hodogaya-ku
	Hazawa Yokohama-Kokudai	羽沢横浜国大	2.7	2.7	Sōtetsu–JR Link Line (SO51)	Kanagawa-ku
	Shin-Yokohama	新横浜	-	-	Tōkyū Shin-Yokohama Line (SH01); Tōkaidō Shinkansen; Yokohama Line (JH16); Blue Line (B25)	Kōhoku-ku
↓ Through-running to/from ↓: From Hazawa Yokohama Kokudai: Saikyō Line, ■ Kawagoe Line for Shinjuku, Kawagoe, and Ōmiya (via Shōnan–Shinjuku Line): From Shin-yokohama: Tōyoko Line for Shibuya & Fukutoshin Line towards Wakōshi (via Tōkyū Shin-Yokohama Line) Meguro Line for Meguro & Mita Line towards Nishi-Takashimadaira / Namboku Line & Saitama Railway Line towards Akabane-iwabuchi & Urawa-Misono (via Tōkyū Shin-Yokohama Line)

== Rolling stock ==
- JR East E233-7000 series 10-car trains
- Sotetsu 12000 series 10-car trains
- Sotetsu 20000 series 10-car trains
- Sotetsu 21000 series 8-car trains
- Tokyu 5050-4000 series 10-car trains
- Tokyu 5080 series 8-car trains
- Tokyu 3000 series 8-car trains
- Tokyu 3020 series 8-car trains
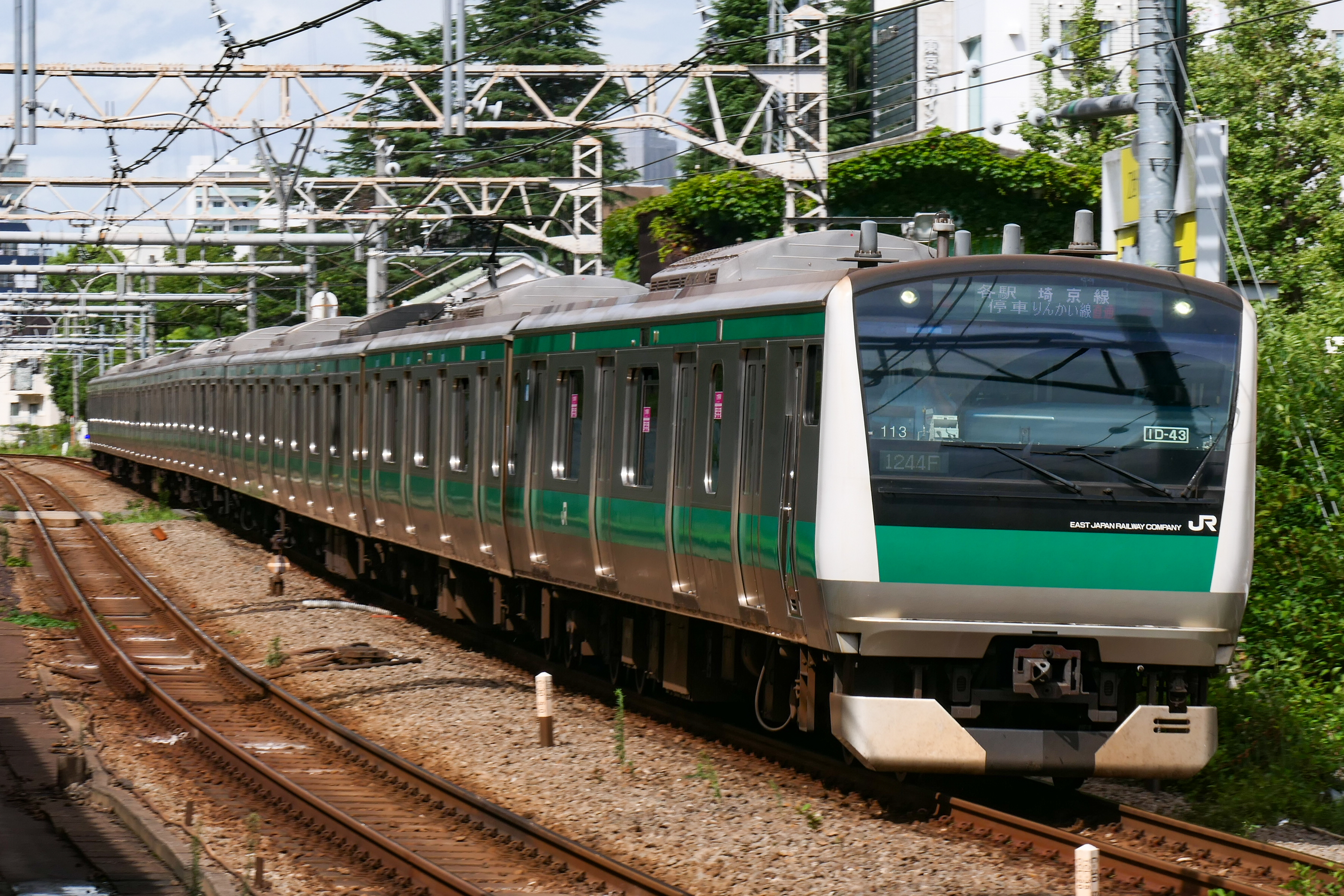
JR East E233-7000 series

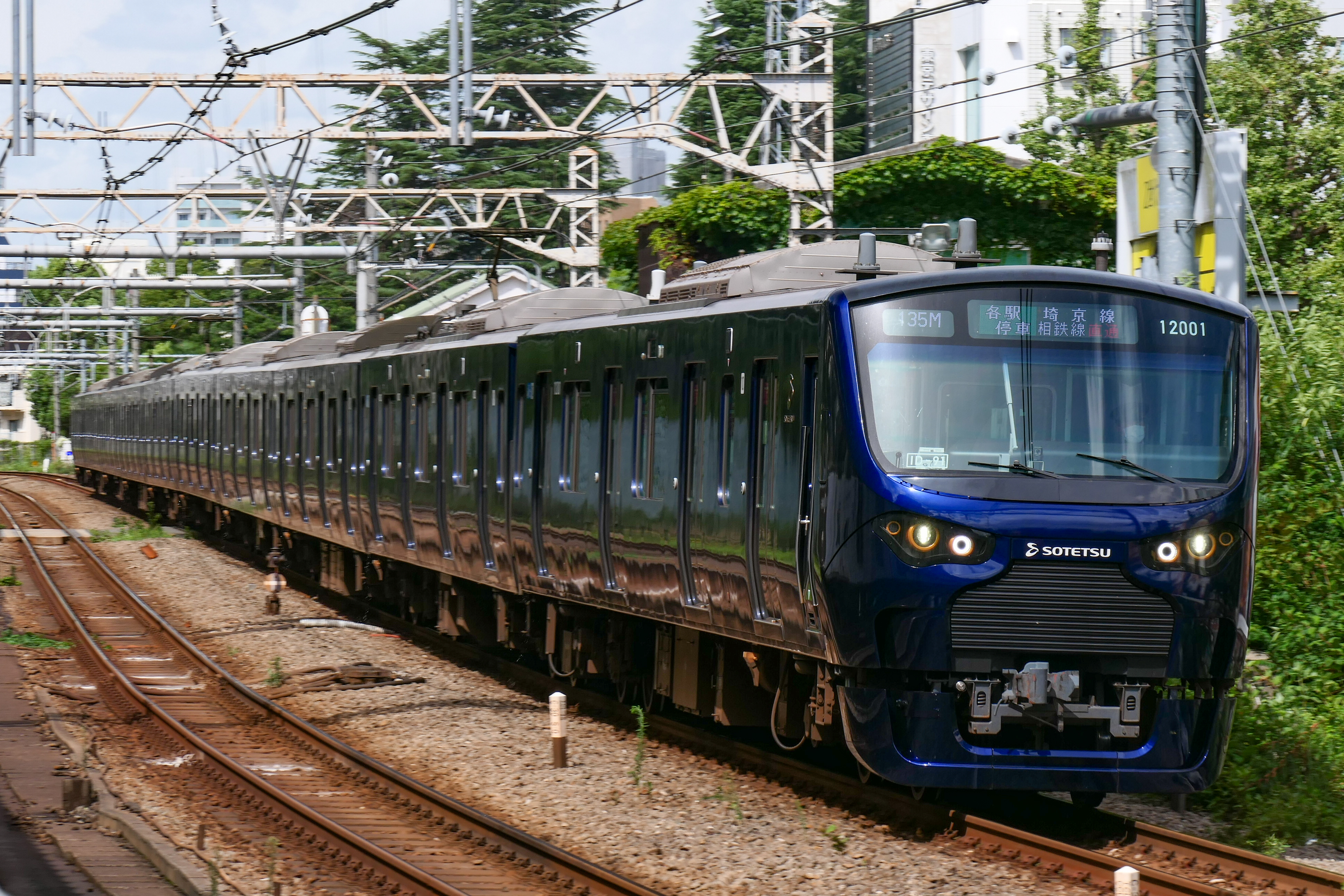
Sotetsu 12000 series

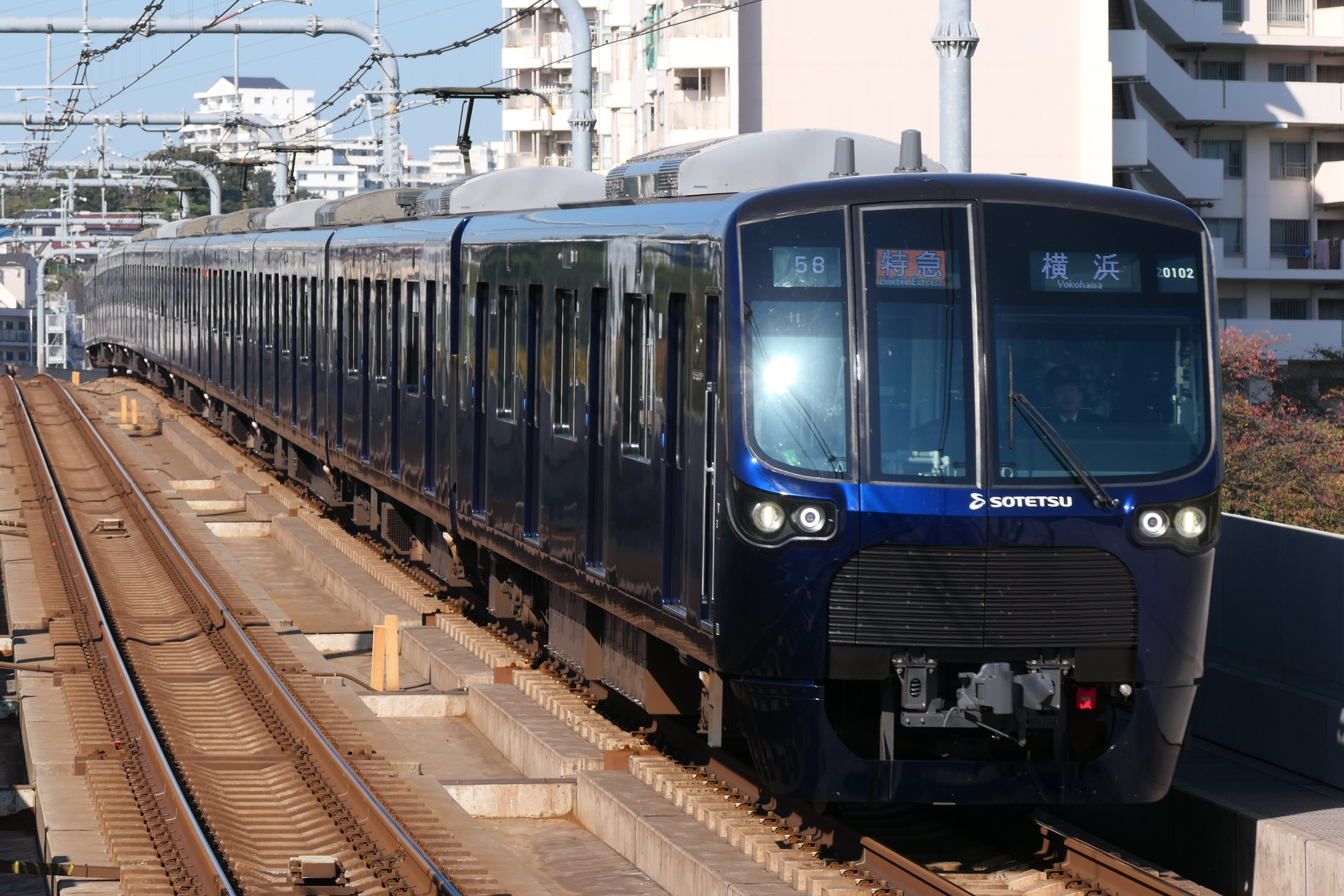
Sotetsu 20000/21000 series

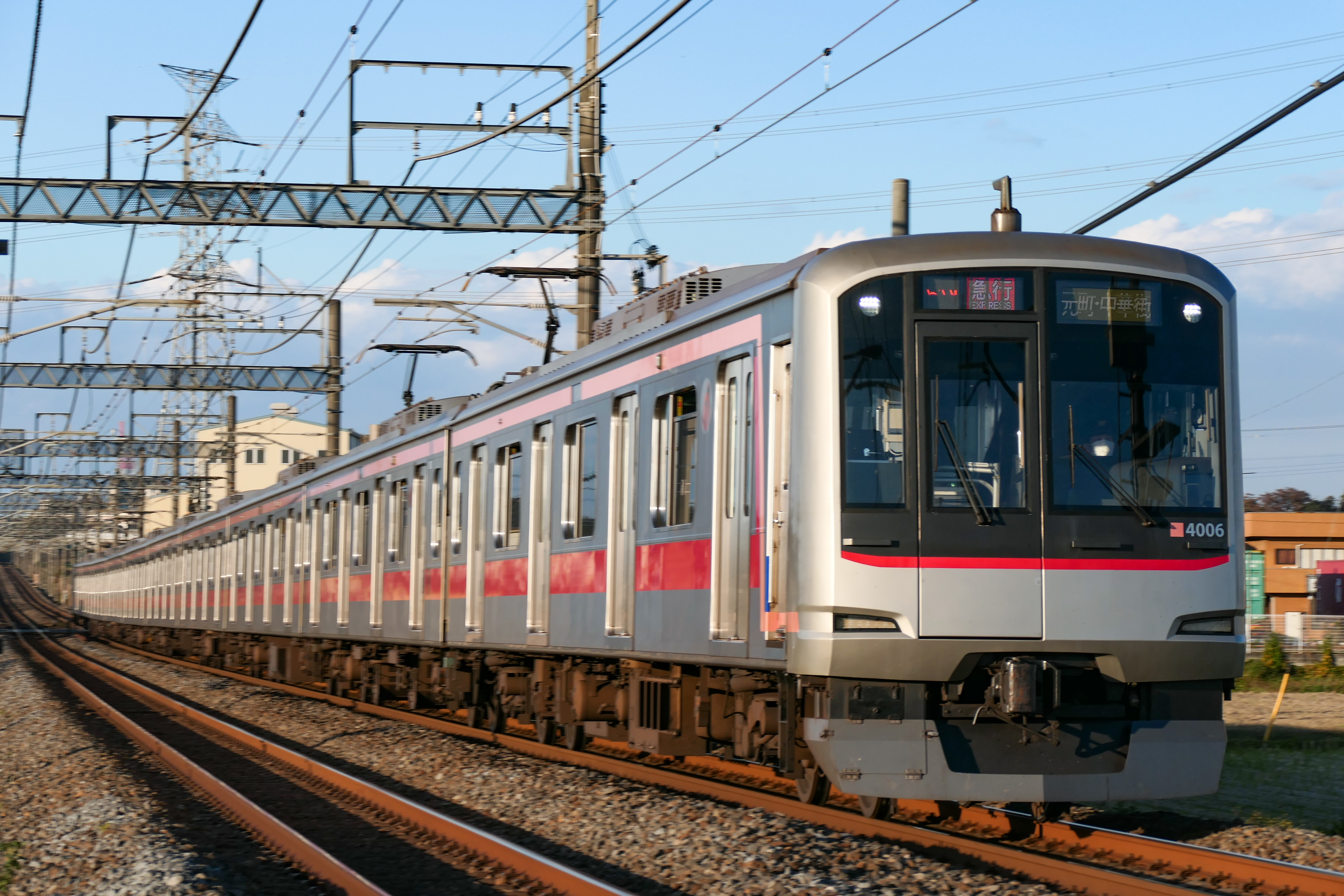
Tokyu 5050-4000 Series

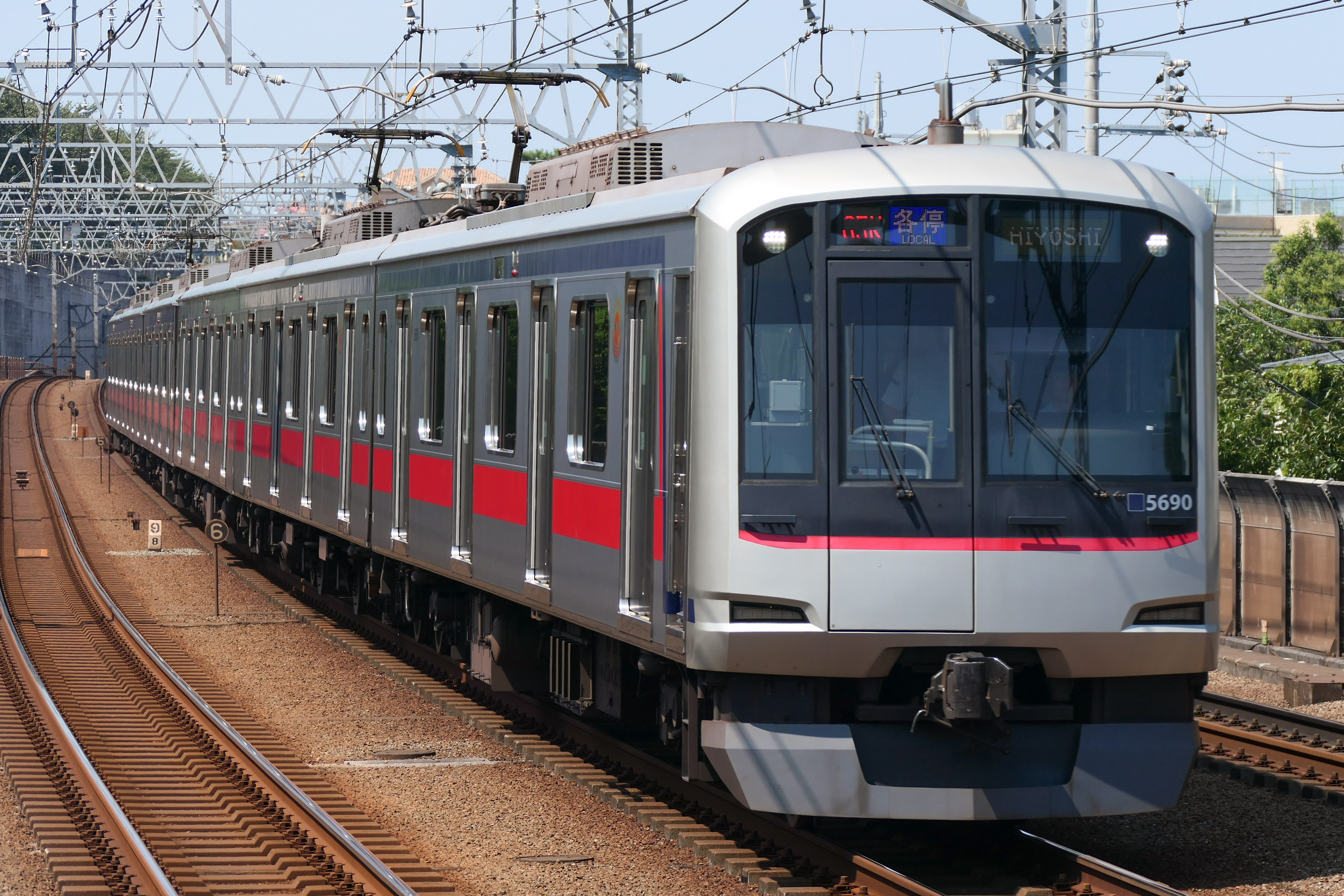
Tokyu 5080 series

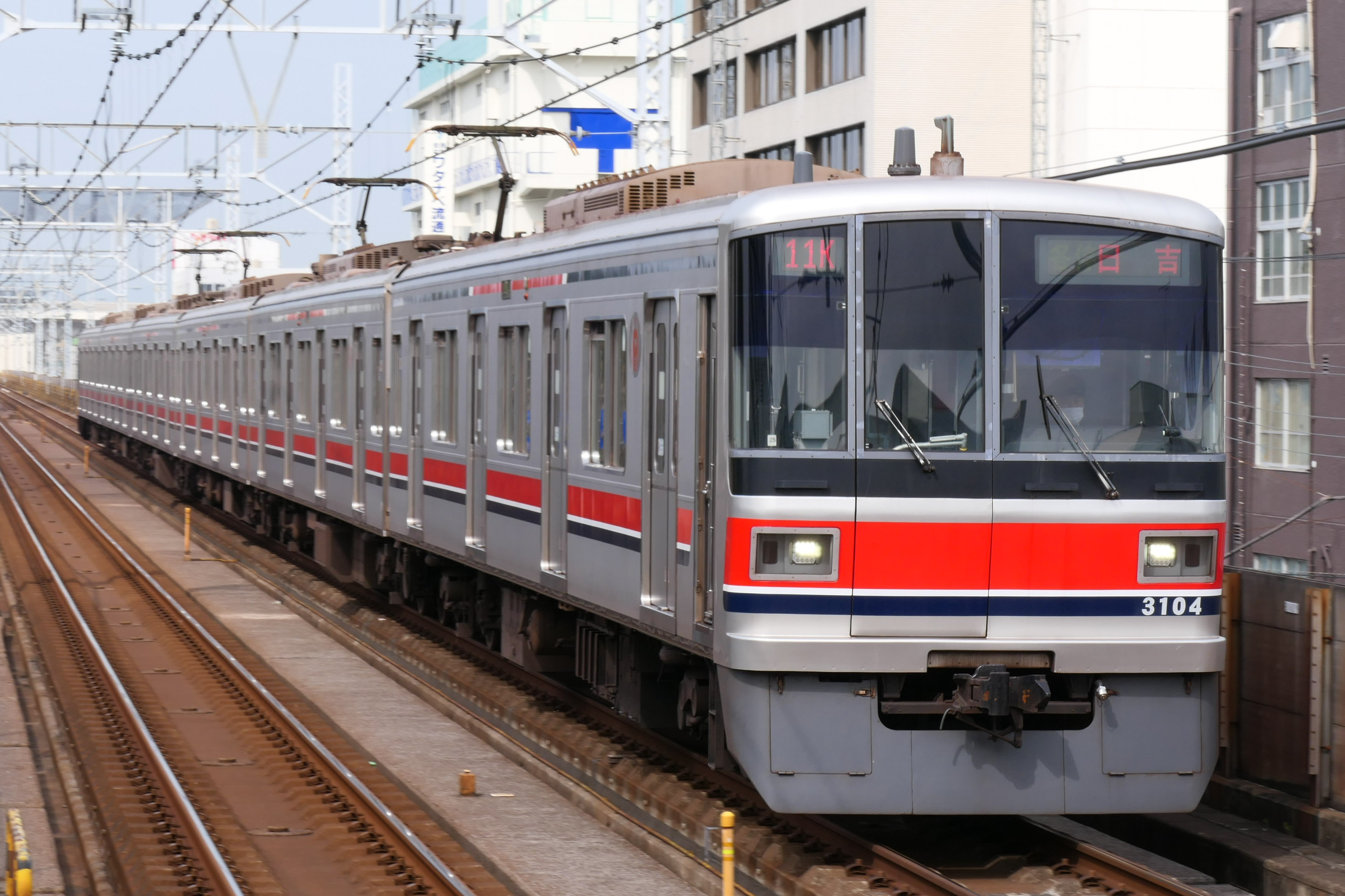
Tokyu 3000 series

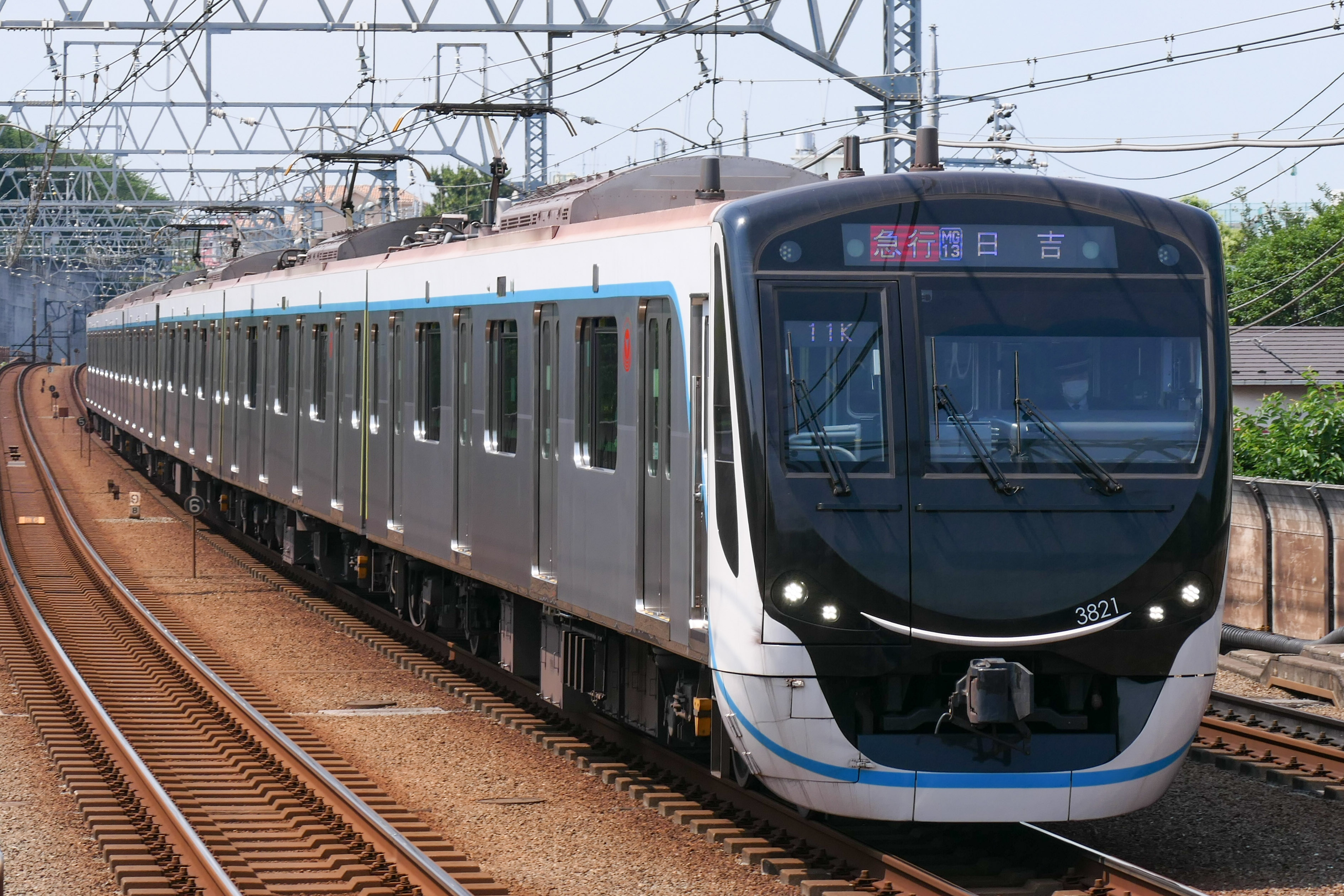
Tokyu 3020 series
