= Ebina Station =

Railway station in Ebina, Kanagawa Prefecture, Japan

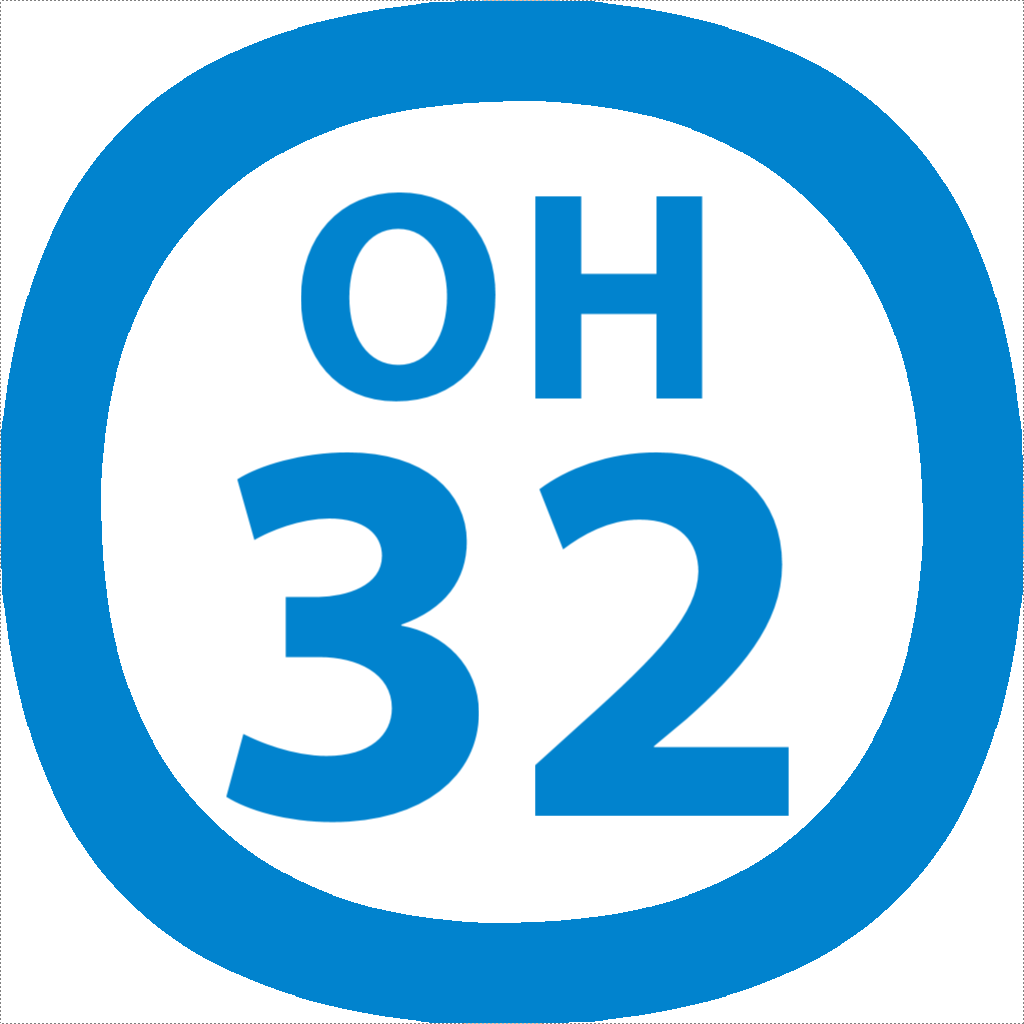
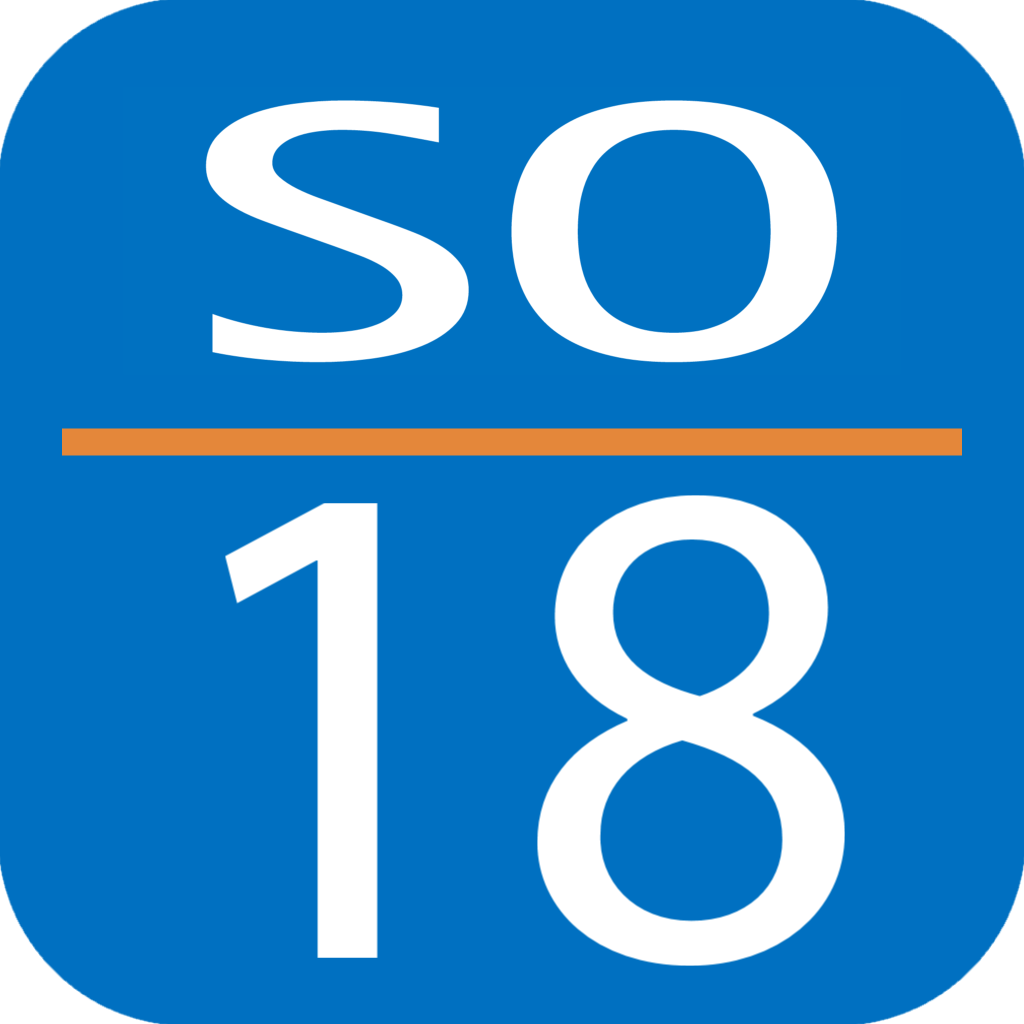
Ebina Station 海老名駅

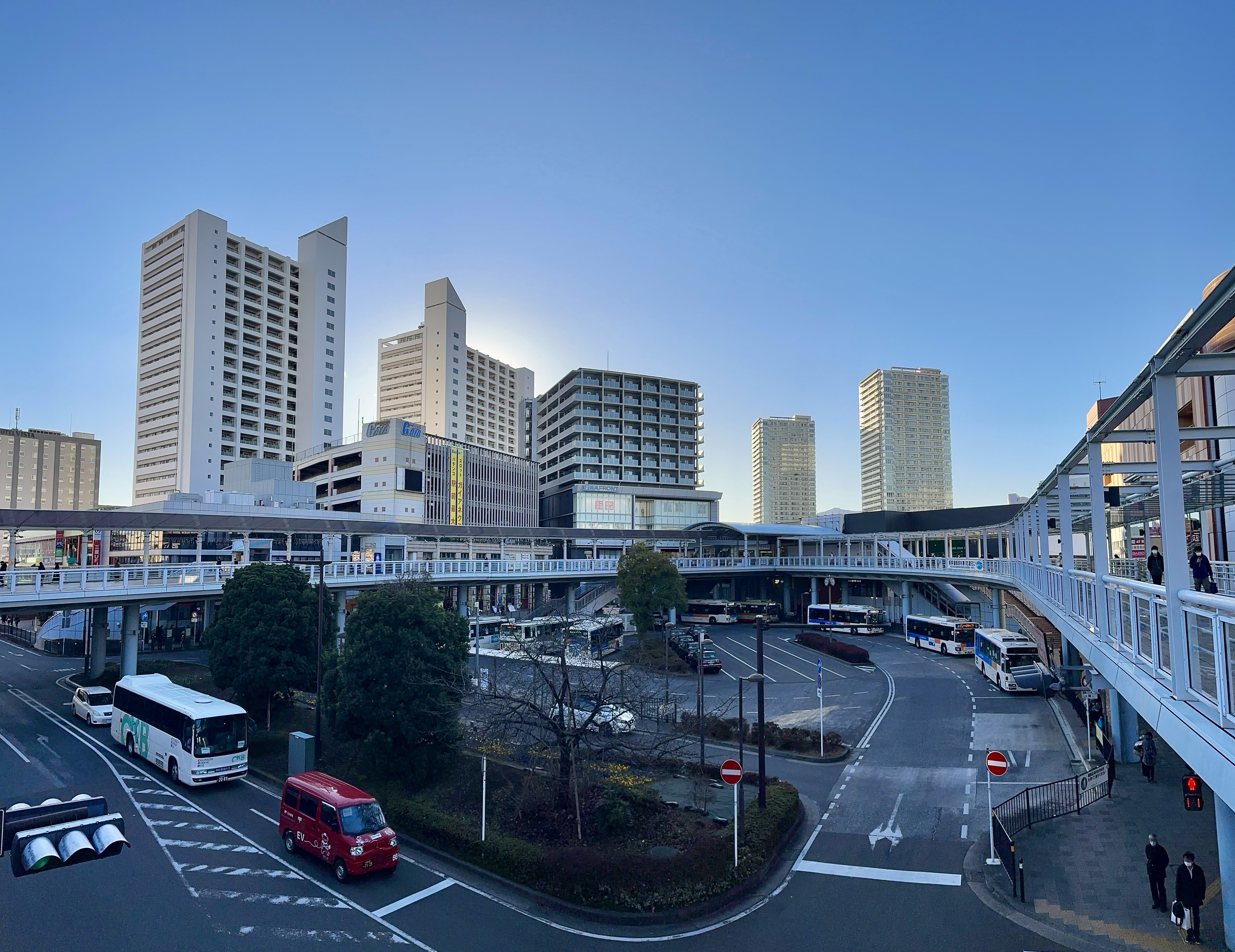
- Odakyu entrance, 2023

General information
- Location: Kamigō, Ebina-shi, Kanagawa-ken 243-0434; Japan
- Coordinates: 35°27′10″N 139°23′27″E
- Operator: JR East; Odakyu Electric Railway; Sagami Railway
- Lines: ■ Sagami Line; Odakyu Odawara Line; Sotetsu Main Line
- Distance: 42.5 km from Shinjuku
- Platforms: 1 bay + 3 island platforms
- Connections: Bus terminal

Other information
- Station code: OH32 (Odakyu); SO18 (Sotetsu)

History
- Opened: November 25, 1941; 84 years ago

Passengers
- FY2019: 14,307 (JR, boarding); 152,370 (Odakyu, total); 123,214 (Sotetsu, total)

Services
Preceding station	JR East	Following station
Iriya towards Hashimoto	Sagami Line	Atsugi towards Chigasaki
Preceding station	Odakyu	Following station
Hon-Atsugi towards Hakone-Yumoto or Gotemba	Romancecar	Sagami-Ono towards Shinjuku or Kita-Senju
Hon-Atsugi towards Odawara	Odawara Line Rapid Express	Sagami-Ono towards Shinjuku
Hon-Atsugi towards Odawara	Odawara Line Express	Sagami-Ono towards Shinjuku or Yoyogi-Uehara
Atsugi One-way operation	Odawara Line Commuter Semi Express	Zama towards Yoyogi-Uehara
Atsugi towards Hon-Atsugi	Odawara Line Semi Express	Zama towards Yoyogi-Uehara
Atsugi towards Hakone-Yumoto	Odawara Line Local	Zama towards Shinjuku or Yoyogi-Uehara
Preceding station	Sagami Railway	Following station
Terminus	Sōtetsu Main Line Limited Express	Yamato towards Yokohama
Terminus	Sōtetsu Main Line Commuter Express Rapid Local	Kashiwadai towards Yokohama
Terminus	Sōtetsu–JR Link Line Limited Express	Yamato towards Shinjuku
Terminus	Sōtetsu–JR Link Line Local	Kashiwadai towards Shinjuku
Location
- Location within Kanagawa Prefecture Location within Japan

Ebina Station (海老名駅, Ebina-eki) is an interchange passenger railway station located in the city of Ebina, Kanagawa, Japan. It is jointly operated by the East Japan Railway Company (JR East), and the private railway operators Odakyu Electric Railway, and Sagami Railway (Sōtetsu).

== Lines ==
Ebina Station is served by the following lines.

- Odakyu Odawara Line
- Sagami Line
- Sōtetsu Main Line

The station is 43.5 km (27.0 mi) from the Odakyu terminus at Shinjuku Station, 15.9 km (9.9 mi) from the Sagami Line terminus at Chigasaki Station, and 24.6 km (15.3 mi) from the Sotetsu terminus at Yokohama Station.

== Station layout ==
=== Sōtetsu ===
The Sōtetsu Main Line station has a bay platform, serving two tracks.

1, 2	Sōtetsu Main Line	for Yamato, Futamata-gawa, Nishiya, and Yokohama; Sōtetsu Shin-Yokohama Line for Hazawa yokohama-kokudai and Shin-Yokohama; Sōtetsu-JR Link Line for Shinjuku and Kawagoe; Tōkyū Shin-Yokohama Line for Hiyoshi; Tōkyū Tōyoko Line for Shibuya; Tokyo Metro Fukutoshin Line for Wakōshi; Tōbu Tōjō Line for Kawagoeshi, Shinrin-kōen, and Ogawamachi; Tōkyū Meguro Line for Meguro; Toei Mita Line for Nishi-takashimadaira; Tokyo Metro Namboku Line for Akabane-iwabuchi; Saitama Rapid Railway Line for Urawa-misono

=== JR East ===
The JR Sagami Line station has a single island platform, serving two tracks. The station has a Midori no Madoguchi staffed ticket office.

1	■ Sagami Line	for Atsugi, Samukawa, and Chigasaki
2	■ Sagami Line	for Kamimizo and Hashimoto

=== Odakyu ===
The Odakyu Odawara Line station has two island platforms serving four tracks.

1, 2	Odakyū Odawara Line	for Hon-Atsugi, Hadano, and Odawara; Hakone Tozan Line for Hakone-Yumoto
3, 4	Odakyū Odawara Line	for Sagami-Ōno, Shin-Yurigaoka, Yoyogi-Uehara, and Shinjuku; Tokyo Metro Chiyoda Line for Ōtemachi, Kita-senju, and Ayase; Jōban Line (Local) for Matsudo, Abiko, and Toride

== History ==
Ebina Station was opened on 25 November 1941 as the terminal station of the Jinchū Railroad (神中鉄道), now Sagami Railway). The Odakyu Line Ebina-Kokubun Station (海老名国分駅), which had been in operation since 1927, was shifted 400 metres (1,300 ft) on 1 April 1943, for joint operation of Ebina Station. From December 1971, Ebina became one of the chief rail yards of the Odakyu line. On 21 December 1973, a new station was opened, located approximately 400 metres (1,300 ft) from the old station in the direction of Odawara. From 21 March 1987, the Sagami Line began operations to Ebina, less than a month before the dissolution and privatization of the Japanese National Railways and formation of the East Japan Railway Company.

Station numbering was introduced to the Odakyu Line in January 2014 with Ebina being assigned station number OH32.

The Odakyu Ebina Station has a unique platform jingle that plays when trains are arriving. The melody is from the song Sakura by the Japanese pop band, Ikimonogakari (いきものがかり). The Odawara bound platforms 1 and 2 play the intro to the song while the Shinjuku / Chiyoda Line bound platforms 3 and 4 play a short portion from the middle of the song. On 19 April 2021 the Romance Car Museum opened beside the west exit to the station.

== Passenger statistics ==
In fiscal 2019, the JR portion of the station was used by an average of 14,307 passengers daily (boarding passengers only). During the same period, the Odakyu station was used by an average of 152,370 passengers daily (total) and the Sotetsu portion of the station by 123,214 passengers (total).

The passenger figures (boarding passengers only) for previous years are as shown below.

Fiscal year	daily average (JR)	daily average (Odakyu)	daily average (Sotetsu)
2005	8,001	66,229	58,907
2010	9,392	65,698	57,022
2015	11,952	71,873	59,276

== See also ==
- List of railway stations in Japan
