= Kita-Ageo Station =

Railway station in Ageo, Saitama Prefecture, Japan

Kita-Ageo Station 北上尾駅
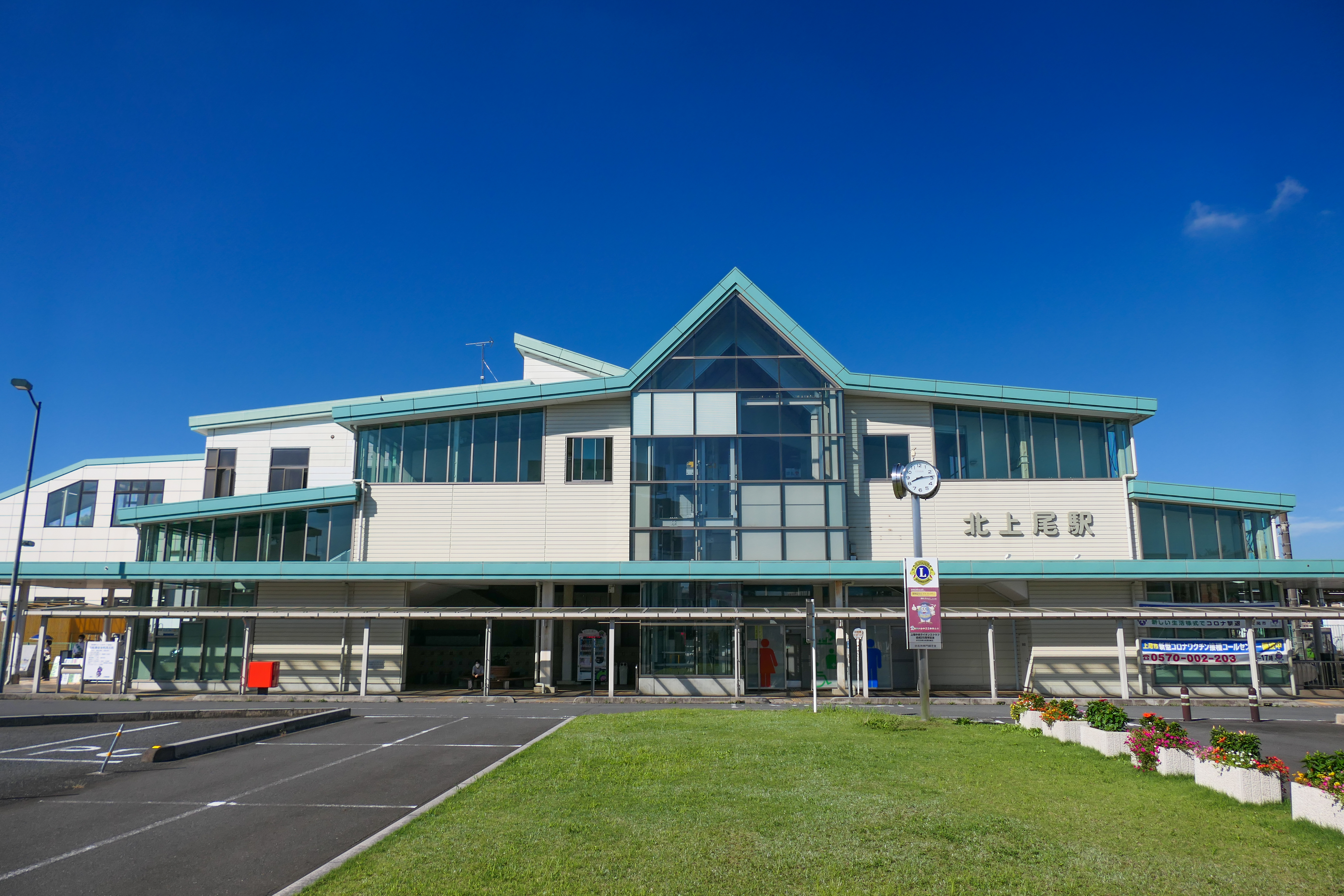
- East entrance of Kita-Ageo Station, August 2021

General information
- Location: Harashinmachi, Ageo-shi, Saitama-ken 362-0016; Japan
- Coordinates: 35°59′09″N 139°34′37″E
- Operator: JR East
- Line: ■ Takasaki Line
- Distance: 9.9 km from Ōmiya
- Platforms: 2 side platforms

Other information
- Status: Staffed
- Website: Official website

History
- Opened: 17 December 1988

Passengers
- FY2019: 15,729 daily

Services
| Preceding station | JR East | Following station |
|---|---|---|
| Okegawa towards Maebashi | Takasaki Line Local | Ageo towards Tokyo |
| Okegawa towards Maebashi | Shōnan–Shinjuku Line Rapid | Ageo towards Odawara |
Location
- Location within Saitama Prefecture Location within Japan

Kita-Ageo Station (北上尾駅, Kita-Ageo-eki) is a passenger railway station located in the city of Ageo, Saitama, Japan, operated by East Japan Railway Company (JR East).

== Lines ==
Kita-Ageo Station is served by the Takasaki Line, with through Shonan-Shinjuku Line and Ueno-Tokyo Line services to and from the Tokaido Line. It is 9.9 kilometers from the nominal starting point of the Takasaki Line at Ōmiya and 40.4 km from Tokyo.

== Layout ==
The station has two side platforms, connected by a footbridge, with an elevated station building. The station is staffed.

=== Platforms ===
| 1 | ■ Takasaki Line (Ueno-Tokyo Line) | for Ōmiya, Ueno, Tokyo, Yokohama, Atami, Numazu and Ito (via Tokaido Line and Ito Line) |
| 1 | ■ Shōnan-Shinjuku Line | for Ōmiya, Shinjuku, Yokohama, Ōfuna, and Odawara (via Tokaido Line) |
| 2 | ■ Takasaki Line | for Kumagaya, Kagohara, Takasaki, and Maebashi |

== History ==
The station opened on 17 December 1988.

== Passenger statistics ==
In fiscal 2019, the station was used by an average of 15,721 passengers daily (boarding passengers only).

== Surrounding area ==
- Saitama Prefectural Kita-Ageo High School
- Ageo Asamadai Post Office

== See also ==
- List of railway stations in Japan
