= Toda Station =

Toda Station (戸田駅) is the name of two train stations in Japan:

- Toda Station (Aichi)
- Toda Station (Saitama)
