= Kita-Toda Station =

Railway station in Toda, Saitama Prefecture, Japan

JA20 Kita-Toda Station 北戸田駅
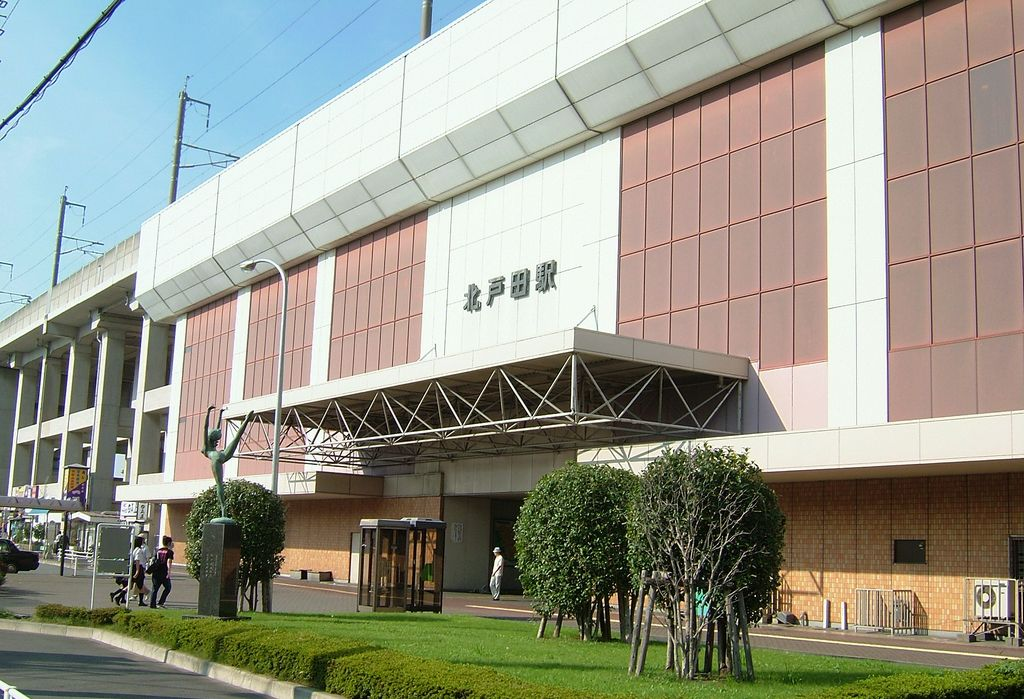
- West entrance of Kita-Toda Station, September 2007

General information
- Location: Niizo, Toda-shi, Saitama-ken 335-0021; Japan
- Coordinates: 35°49′38.83″N 139°39′37.10″E
- Operator: JR East
- Line: Saikyō Line
- Distance: 27.1 km from Ōsaki
- Platforms: 1 island platform
- Connections: Bus stop

Other information
- Status: Staffed
- Website: Official website

History
- Opened: 30 September 1985

Passengers
- FY2019: 22,196

Services
Preceding station	JR East	Following station
Toda JA19 towards Ōsaki	Saikyō Line Local	Musashi-Urawa JA21 towards Ōmiya
Location
- Location within Saitama Prefecture Location within Japan

Kita-Toda Station (北戸田駅, Kita-Toda-eki) is a passenger railway station located in the city of Toda, Saitama, Japan, operated by the East Japan Railway Company (JR East).

== Lines ==
Kita-Toda Station is served by the Saikyō Line which runs between Ōsaki in Tokyo and Ōmiya in Saitama Prefecture. Some trains continue northward to Kawagoe via the Kawagoe Line and southward to Shin-Kiba via the TWR Rinkai Line. The station is located 13.7 km north of Ikebukuro Station. The station identification colour is "orange".

== Station layout ==
The station consists of one elevated island platform serving two tracks, with the station building located underneath. The tracks of the Tōhoku Shinkansen also run adjacent to this station, on the west side. The station is staffed.

=== Platforms ===
1	Saikyō Line	for Akabane, Shinjuku, and Ōsaki; Rinkai Line for Shin-Kiba
2	Saikyō Line	for Musashi-Urawa, Ōmiya, and Kawagoe

An arrangement of the Toda City song has been used as the departure melody for trains departing from the up platform (platform 1) since 1 August 2007.

== History ==
Kita-Toda Station opened on 30 September 1985.

== Passenger statistics ==
In fiscal 2019, the station was used by an average of 22,196 passengers daily (boarding passengers only).

The passenger figures for previous years are as shown below.

Fiscal year	Daily average
2000	14,125
2005	14,505
2010	16,583
2015	20,243

== Surrounding area ==
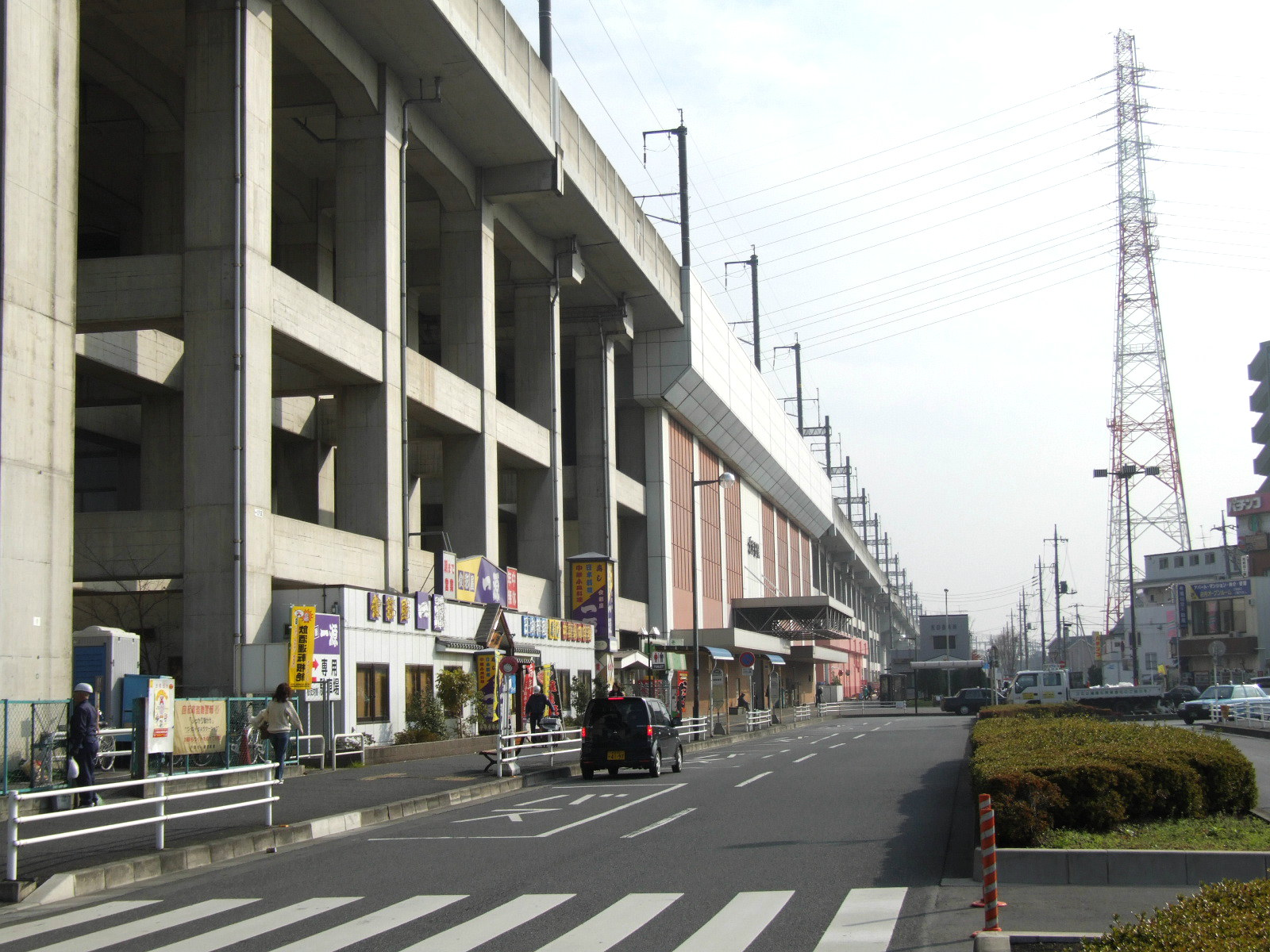
West side of the station, December 2006

- National Route 298

=== Schools ===
- Saitama Prefectural Nanryo High School
- Saitama Municipal Urawa Minami High School
- Saitama Municipal Tsuji Elementary School
- Toda Municipal Ashihara Elementary School

== See also ==
- List of railway stations in Japan
