= Toda Station (Saitama) =

Railway station in Toda, Saitama Prefecture, Japan

JA19 Toda Station 戸田駅
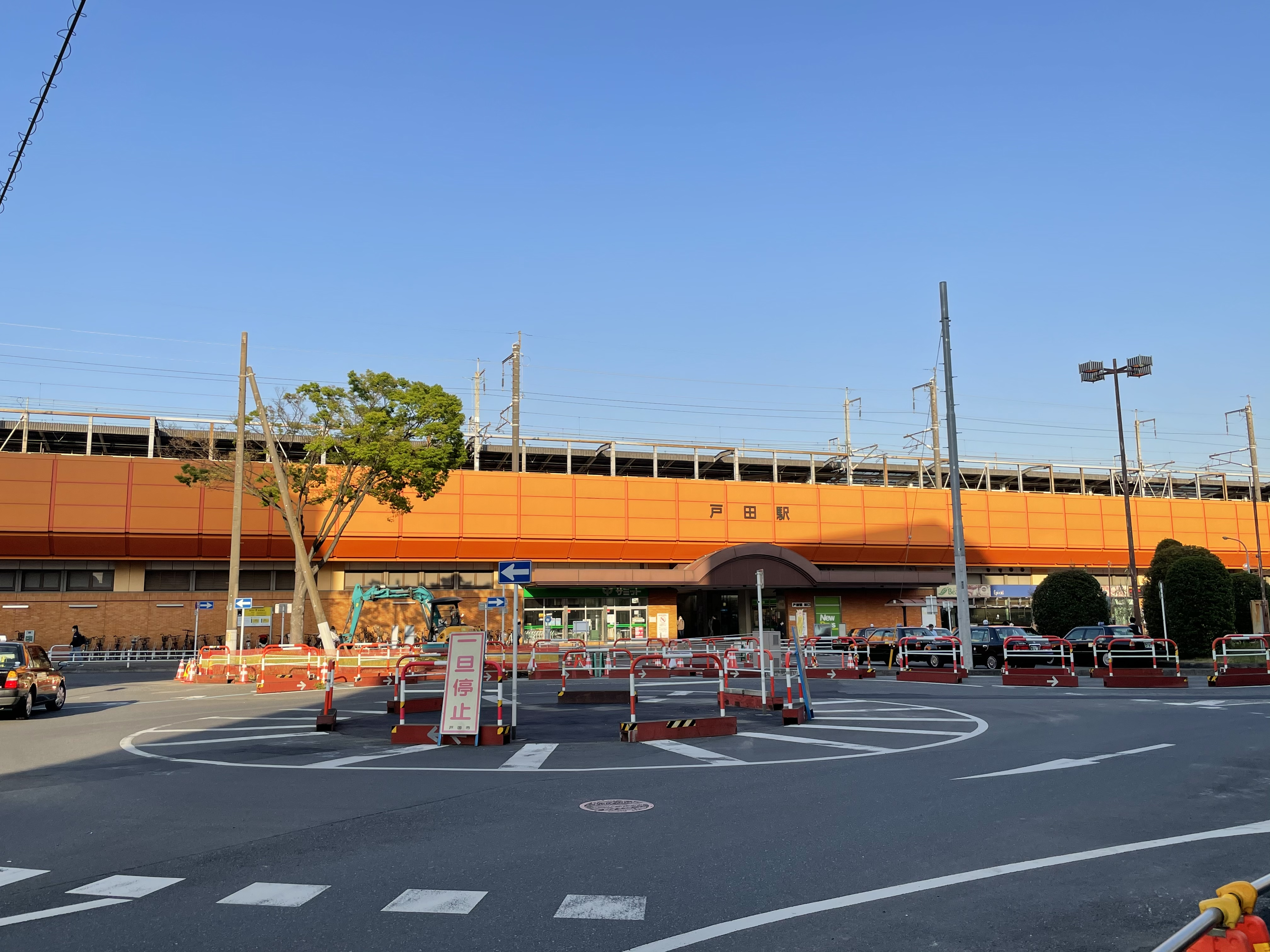
- West side of the station in April 2021

General information
- Location: Niizo, Toda-shi, Saitama-ken 335-0021; Japan
- Coordinates: 35°49′3.51″N 139°40′10.55″E
- Operator: JR East
- Line: Saikyō Line
- Distance: 25.7 km from Ōsaki
- Platforms: 1 island platform
- Connections: Bus stop

Other information
- Status: Staffed
- Website: Official website

History
- Opened: 30 September 1985

Passengers
- FY2019: 21,355

Services
Preceding station	JR East	Following station
Toda-Kōen JA18 towards Ōsaki	Saikyō Line Local	Kita-Toda JA20 towards Ōmiya
Location
- Location within Saitama Prefecture Location within Japan

Toda Station (戸田駅, Toda-eki) is a passenger railway station located in the city of Toda, Saitama, Japan, operated by the East Japan Railway Company (JR East).

== Lines ==
Toda Station is served by the Saikyō Line which runs between Ōsaki in Tokyo and Ōmiya in Saitama Prefecture. Some trains continue northward to Kawagoe via the Kawagoe Line and southward to Shin-Kiba via the TWR Rinkai Line. The station is located 12.3 km north of Ikebukuro Station. The station identification colour is "vermillion".

== Station layout ==
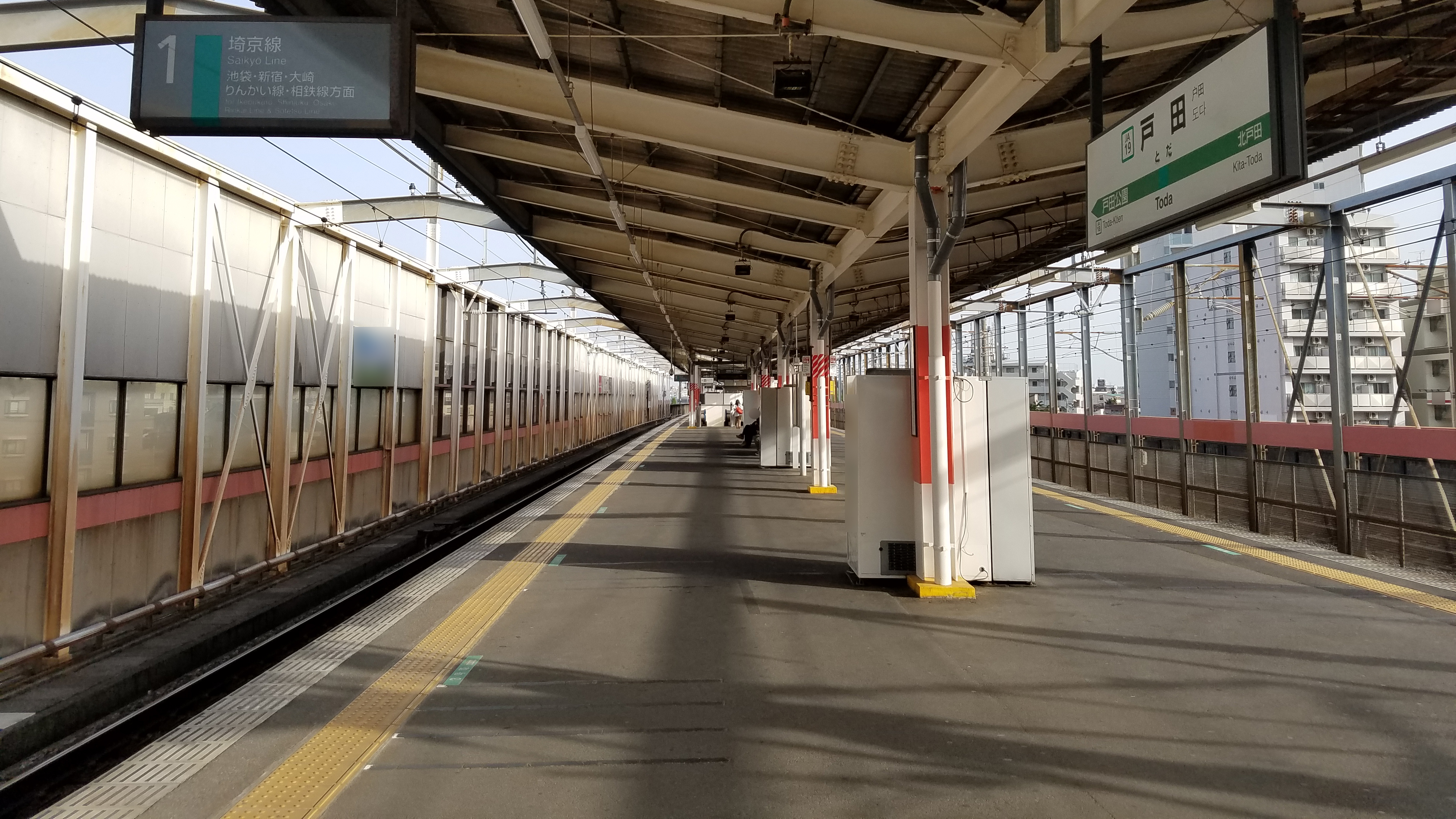
The station platform in May 2021

The station consists of one elevated island platform serving two tracks, with the station building located underneath. The tracks of the Tōhoku Shinkansen also run adjacent to this station, on the west side. The station is staffed.

=== Platforms ===
1	Saikyō Line	for Akabane, Shinjuku, and Ōsaki; Rinkai Line for Shin-Kiba
2	Saikyō Line	for Musashi-Urawa, Ōmiya, and Kawagoe

An arrangement of the Toda City song has been used as the departure melody for trains departing from the up platform (platform 1) since 1 August 2007.

== History ==
Toda Station opened on 30 September 1985.

== Passenger statistics ==
In fiscal 2019, the station was used by an average of 21,355 passengers daily (boarding passengers only).

The passenger figures for previous years are as shown below.

Fiscal year	Daily average
2000	14,236
2005	15,746
2010	16,811
2015	18,813

== Surrounding area ==
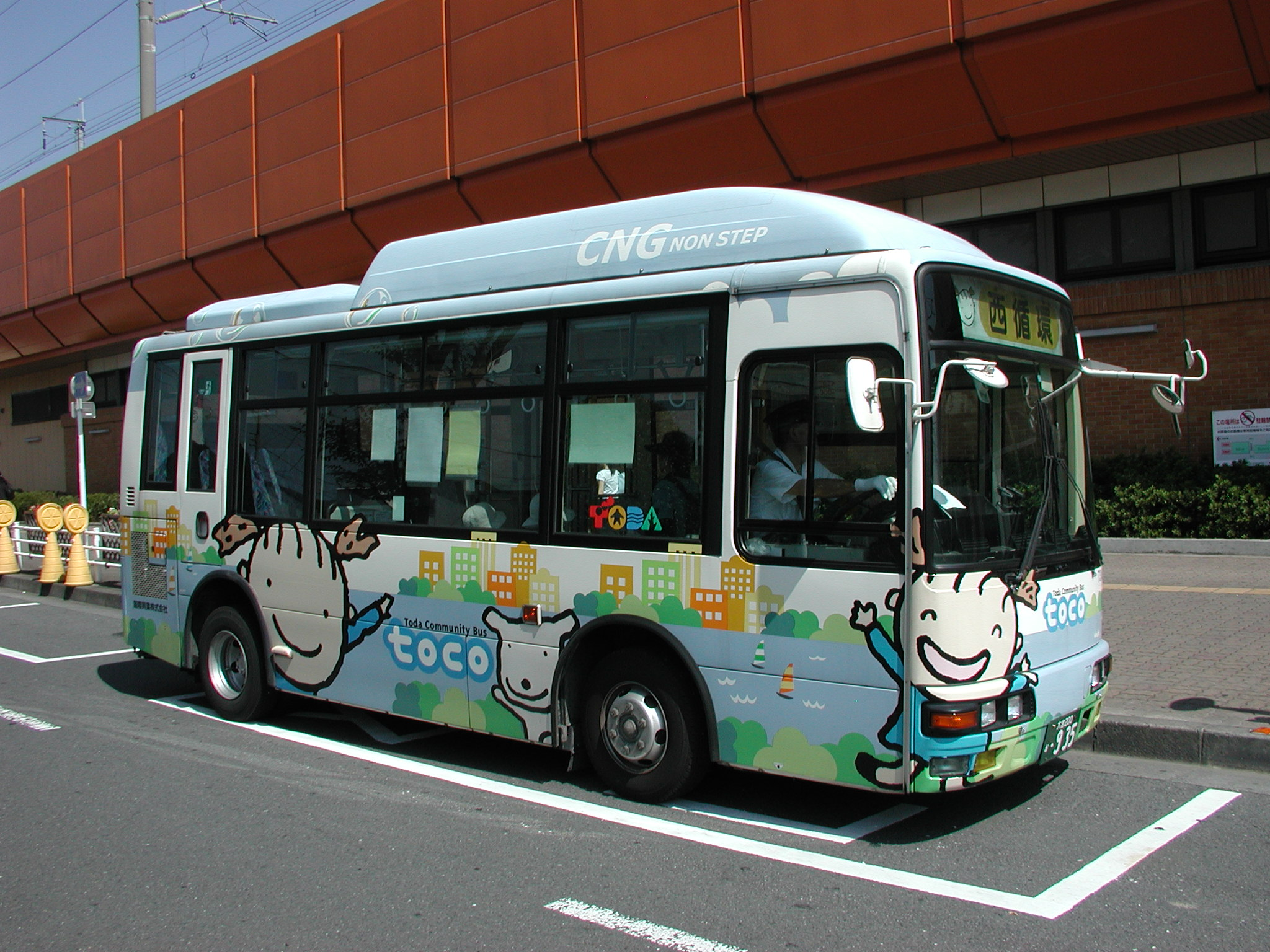
"Toco" community bus in front of Toda Station, September 2007

=== East side ===
- Toda City Office
- Toda Civic Cultural Hall
- Ushiroya Park
- Warabi Police Station
- Warabi Post Office
- Kami-Toda Post Office

=== West side ===
- Toda Municipal Library
- Toda Civic Folk Museum
- Toda Civic Sports Centre
- Toda Fire Station
- Saitama Prefectural Toda Shoyo High School
- Toda Municipal Niizo Junior High School
- Toda Municipal Niizo Kita Elementary School

== See also ==
- List of railway stations in Japan
