= Miyahara Station =

Railway station in Saitama, Japan

Miyahara Station 宮原駅
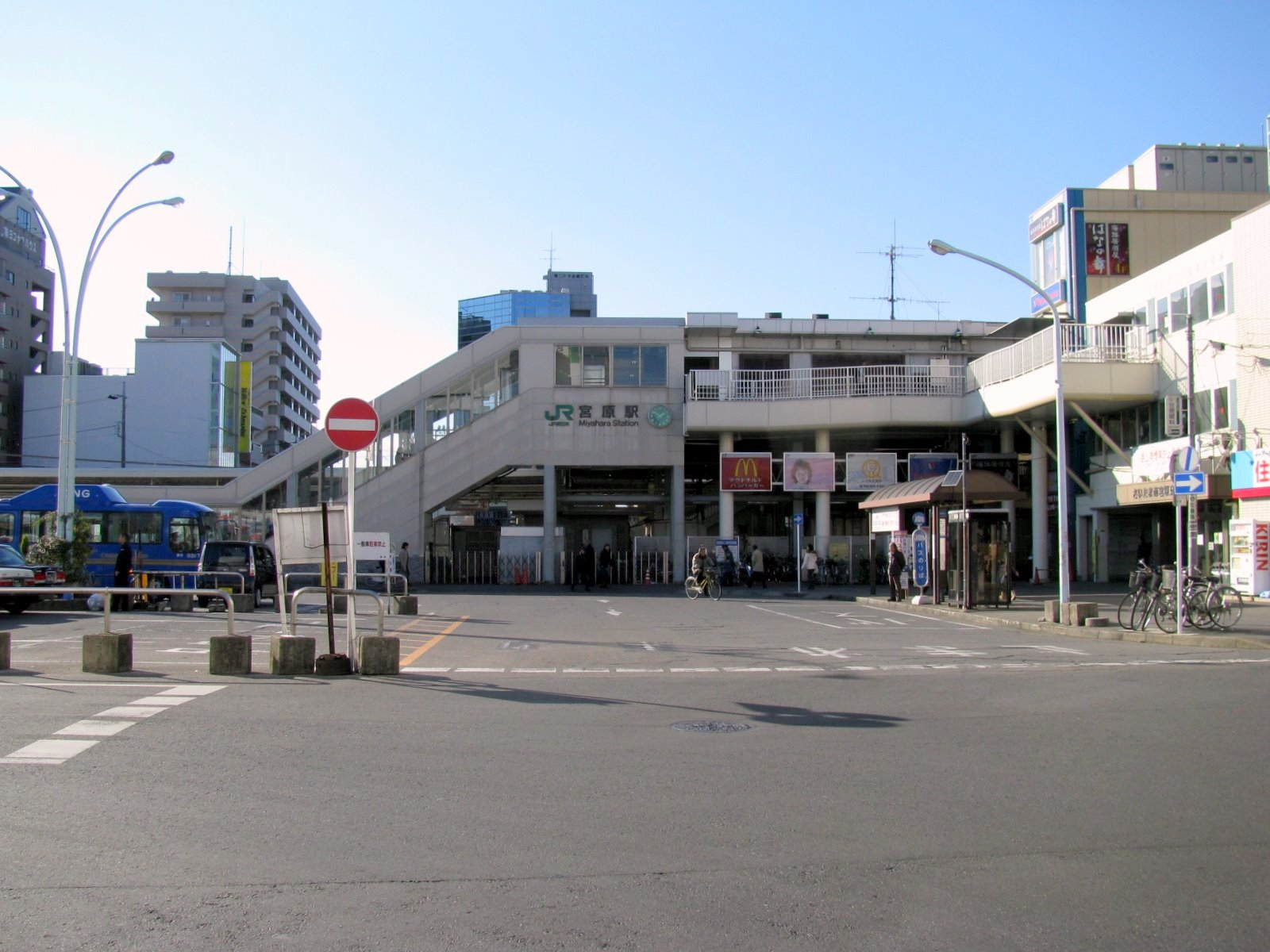
- Miyahara Station east entrance, 2008

General information
- Location: 3-518 Miyahara-cho, Kita-ku, Saitama-shi, Saitama-ken 331-0812; Japan
- Coordinates: 35.9402°N 139.6096°E
- Operator: JR East
- Line: ■ Takasaki Line
- Distance: 4.0 km from Ōmiya
- Platforms: 2 island platforms

Other information
- Status: Staffed
- Website: Official website

History
- Opened: 15 July 1948

Passengers
- FY2019: 24,337 (daily, boarding only)

Services
Preceding station	JR East	Following station
Ageo towards Maebashi	Takasaki Line Local	Ōmiya towards Tokyo
Ageo towards Takasaki or Maebashi	Shōnan–Shinjuku Line Rapid	Ōmiya towards Odawara
Location
- Location within Saitama Prefecture Location within Japan

Miyahara Station (宮原駅, Miyahara-eki) is a passenger railway station located in Kita-ku, the city of Saitama, Saitama Prefecture, Japan, operated by the East Japan Railway Company (JR East).

== Lines ==
Miyahara Station is served by the Takasaki Line, with through Shōnan-Shinjuku Line and Ueno-Tokyo Line services to and from the Tōkaidō Main Line. It is 4.0 kilometers from the nominal starting point of the Takasaki Line at Ōmiya.

== Layout ==
The station has two island platforms serving four tracks, connected by a footbridge, with an elevated station building located above the platforms. The station is staffed.

=== Platforms ===
1, 2	■ Takasaki Line (Ueno-Tokyo Line)	for Ōmiya, Ueno, Tokyo, Yokohama, Atami, Numazu and Itō (via Tokaido Line and Itō Line)
1, 2	■ Shōnan-Shinjuku Line	for Ōmiya, Shinjuku, Yokohama, Ōfuna, and Odawara (via Tōkaido Line)
3, 4	■ Takasaki Line	for Kumagaya, Kagohara, Takasaki, and Maebashi

== History ==
Miyahara Station was opened on 15 July 1948. The station became part of the JR East network after the privatization of the JNR on 1 April 1987.

== Passenger statistics ==
In fiscal 2019, the station was used by an average of 24,337 passengers daily (boarding passengers only).

== Surrounding area ==
- National Route 17
- Miyahara Post Office
- former Nakasendo highway
- Seigakuin University

== See also ==
- List of railway stations in Japan

== Gallery ==
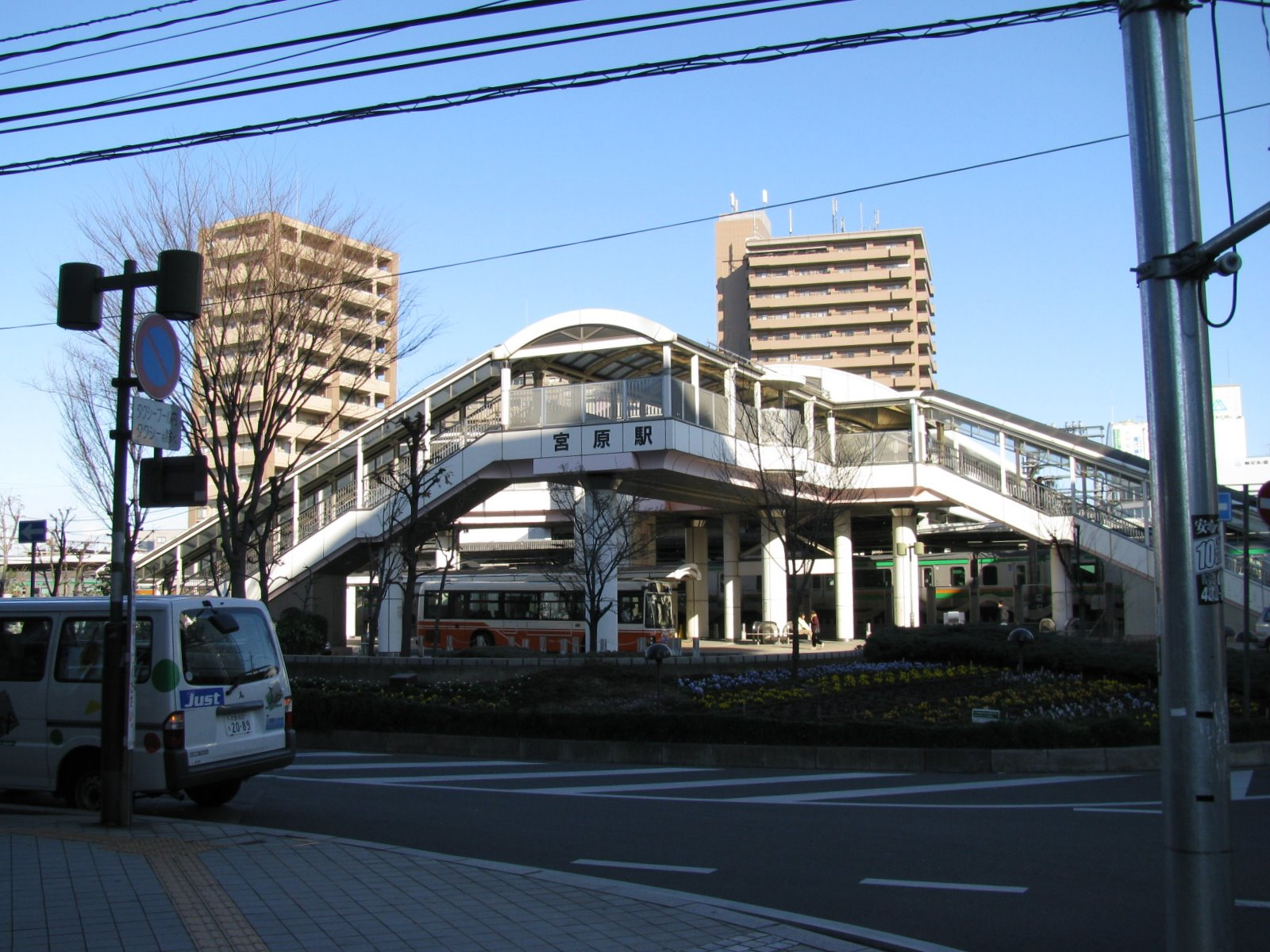
The west entrance of Miyahara Station

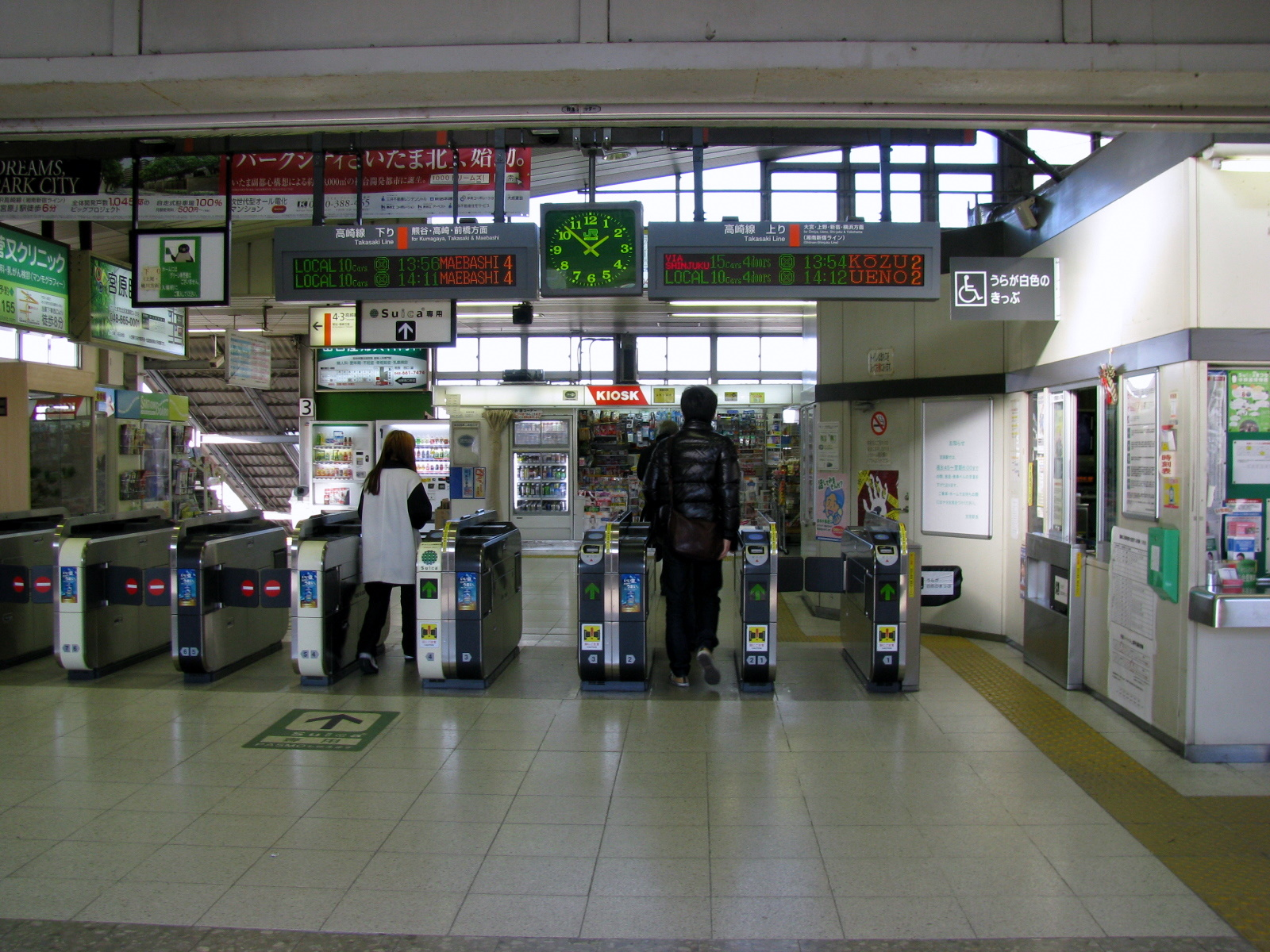
Ticket gates

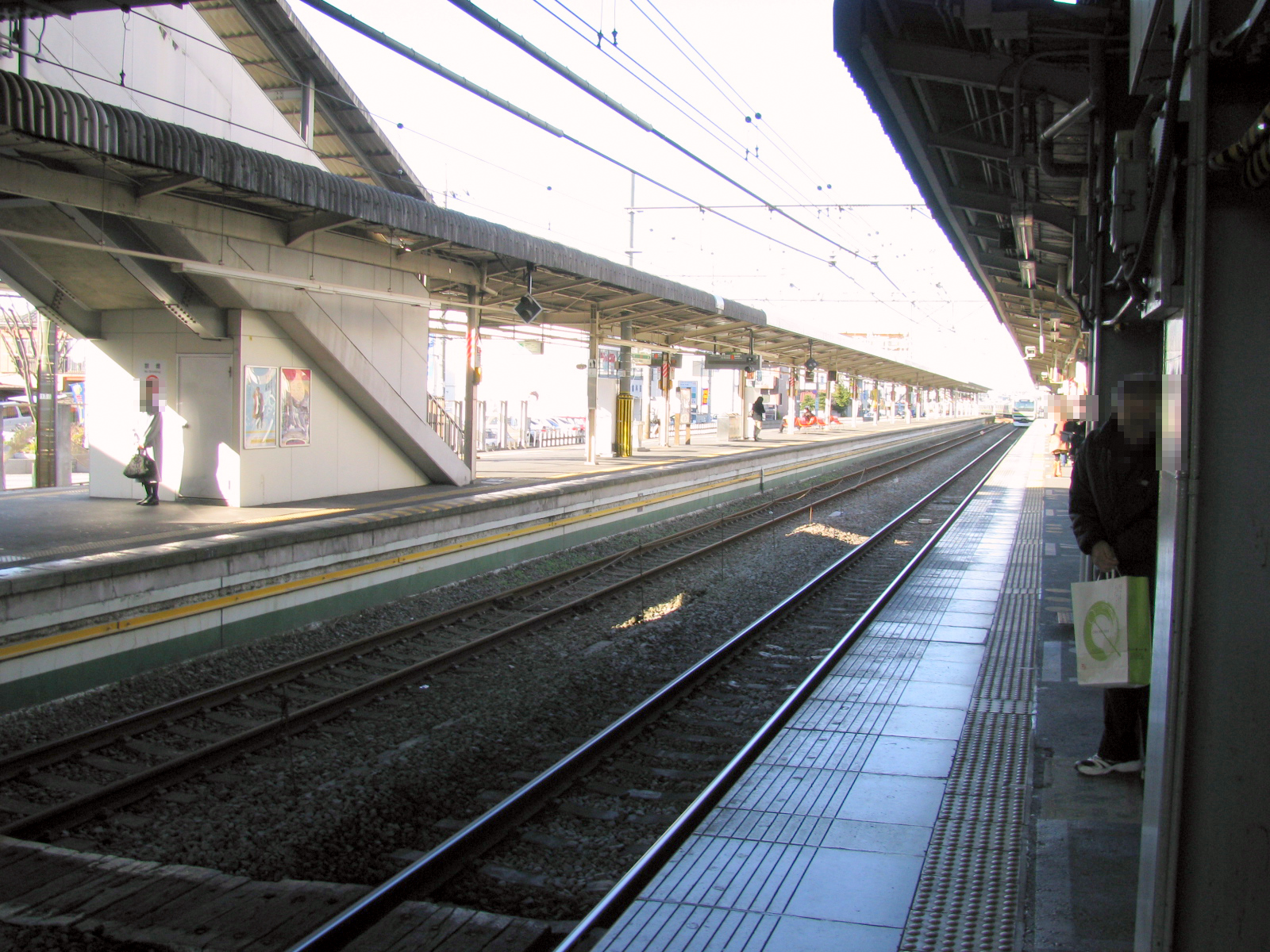
Platforms
