= Ageo Station =

Railway station in Saitama Prefecture, Japan

Ageo Station 上尾駅
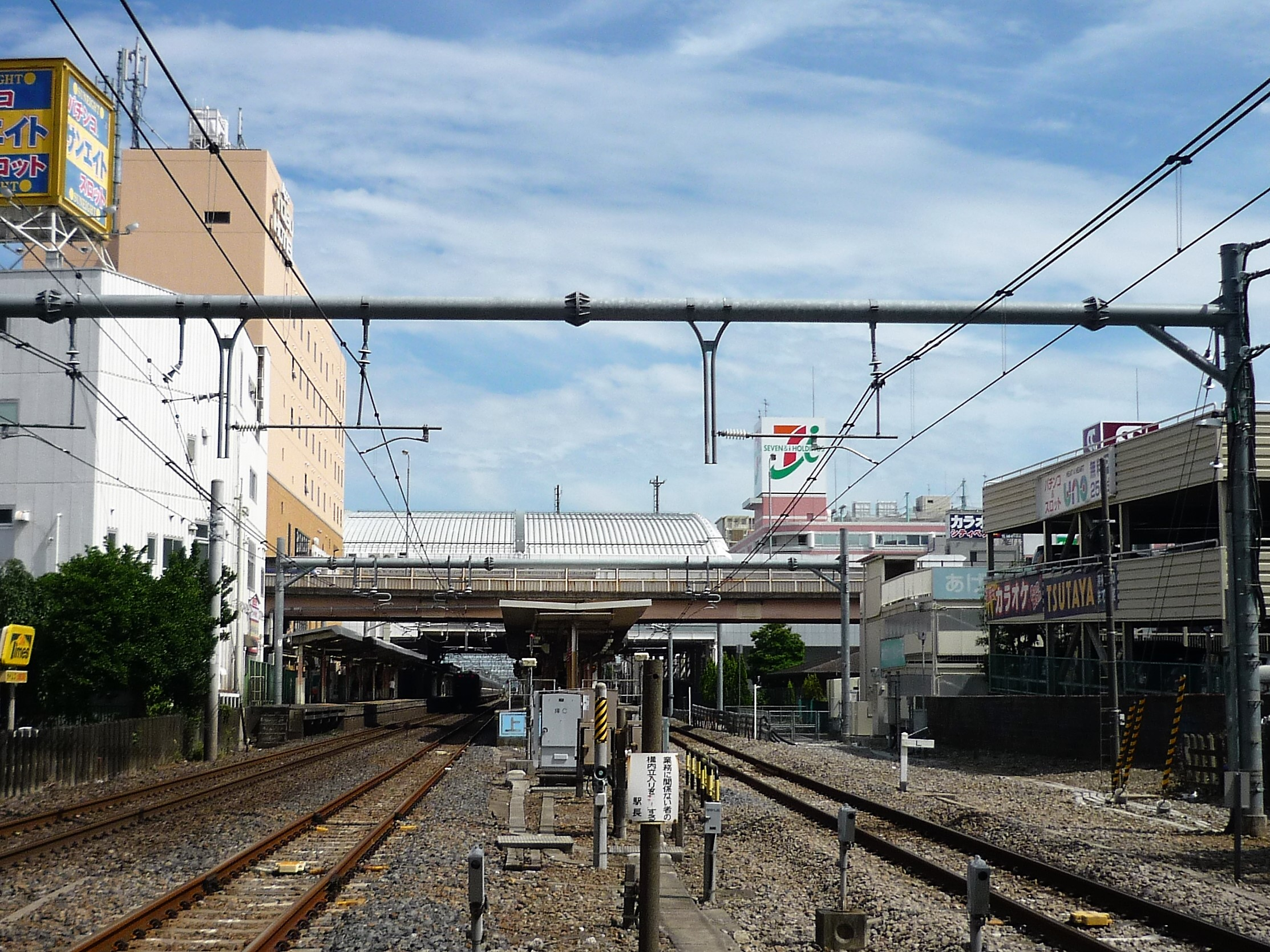
- Ageo Station 2018/06

General information
- Location: Kashiwaza 1-1-18, Ageo-shi, Saitama-ken; Japan
- Coordinates: 35°58′22″N 139°35′20″E
- Operator: JR East
- Line: ■ Takasaki Line
- Distance: 8.2 km from Ōmiya
- Platforms: 1 side platform, 1 island platform

Other information
- Status: Staffed (Midori no Madoguchi )
- Website: Official website

History
- Opened: 28 July 1883

Passengers
- FY2019: 41,655 daily

Services
Preceding station	JR East	Following station
Okegawa towards Takasaki	Akagi	Ōmiya towards Ueno or Shinjuku
Okegawa towards Takasaki	Takasaki Line Rapid Urban	Ōmiya One-way operation
Kita-Ageo towards Maebashi	Takasaki Line Local	Miyahara towards Tokyo
Okegawa towards Takasaki	Shōnan–Shinjuku Line Special Rapid	Ōmiya towards Odawara
Kita-Ageo towards Maebashi	Shōnan–Shinjuku Line Rapid	Miyahara towards Odawara
Location
- Location within Saitama Prefecture Location within Japan

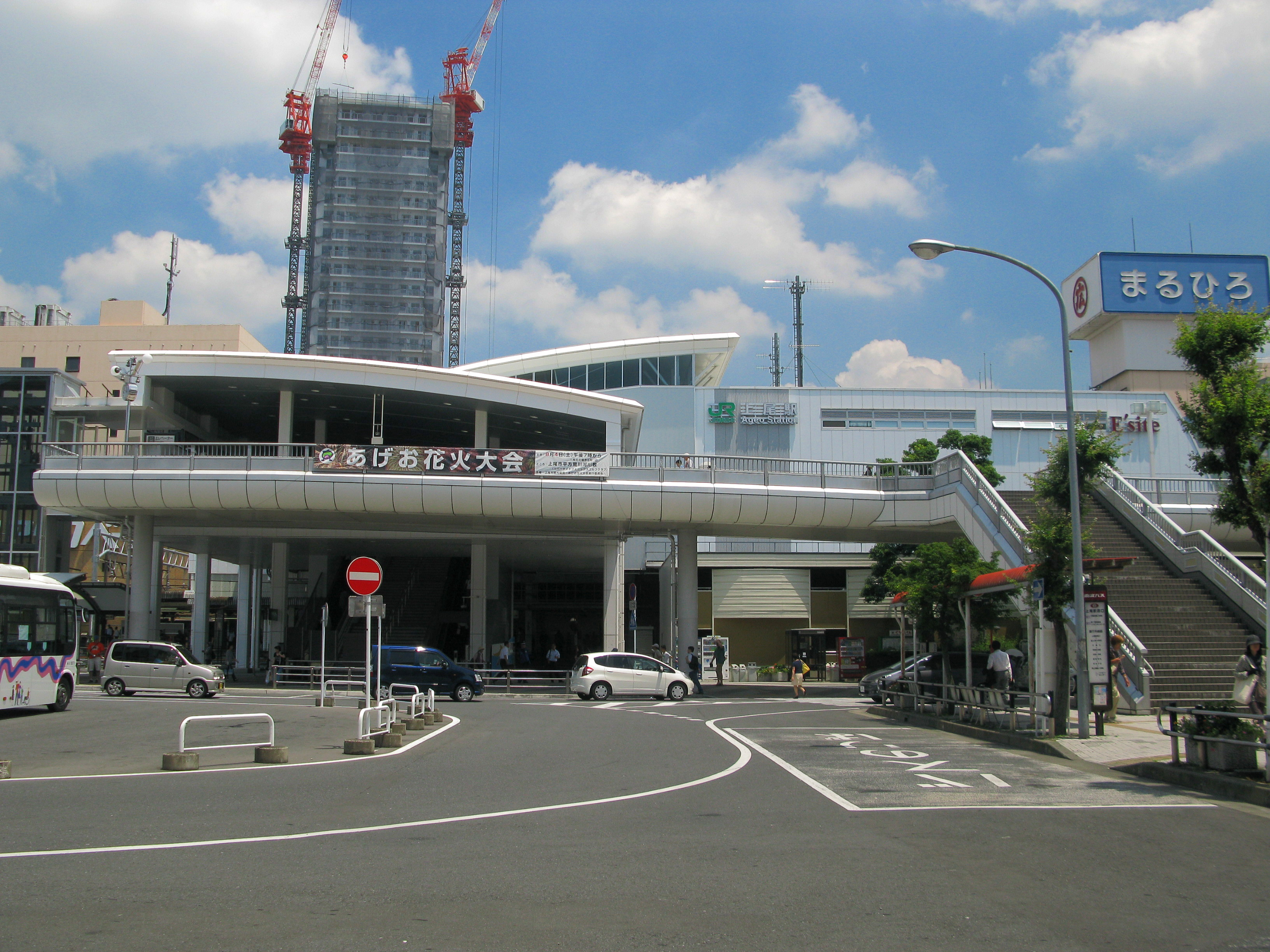
West entrance to Ageo Station, July 2012

Ageo Station (上尾駅, Ageo-eki) is a passenger railway station located in the city of Ageo, Saitama, Japan, operated by East Japan Railway Company (JR East).

== Lines ==
Ageo Station is served by the Takasaki Line, with through Shonan-Shinjuku Line and Ueno-Tokyo Line services to and from the Tokaido Line. It is 8.2 kilometers from the nominal starting point of the Takasaki Line at Ōmiya, and 38.7 km from Tokyo.

== Layout ==
The station has one side platform and one island platform serving three tracks, connected by a footbridge, with an elevated station building located above the platforms. The station has a "Midori no Madoguchi" staffed ticket office.

=== Platforms ===
1	■ Takasaki Line (Ueno-Tokyo Line)	for Ōmiya, Ueno, Tokyo, Yokohama, Atami, Numazu and Ito (via Tokaido Line and Ito Line)
1	■ Shōnan-Shinjuku Line	for Ōmiya, Shinjuku, Yokohama, Ōfuna, and Odawara (via Tokaido Line)
2	■ Takasaki Line	(for both directions)
3	■ Takasaki Line	for Kumagaya, Kagohara, Takasaki, and Maebashi

== History ==
Ageo station opened on 28 July 1883.

The station became part of the JR East network after the privatization of the JNR on 1 April 1987.

=== 1973 riots ===
On 13 March 1973, when a labor union attempted to protest by causing train delays, thousands of commuters rioted at the station, assaulting station personnel and destroying equipment over a six-hour period.

== Passenger statistics ==
In fiscal 2019, the station was used by an average of 41,655 passengers daily (boarding passengers only).

== Surrounding area ==
- Ageo City Hall
- Ageo Post Office
- Ageo City General Hospital

== See also ==
- List of railway stations in Japan
