= Ōmiya Station (Saitama) =

Major railway station in Saitama, Japan

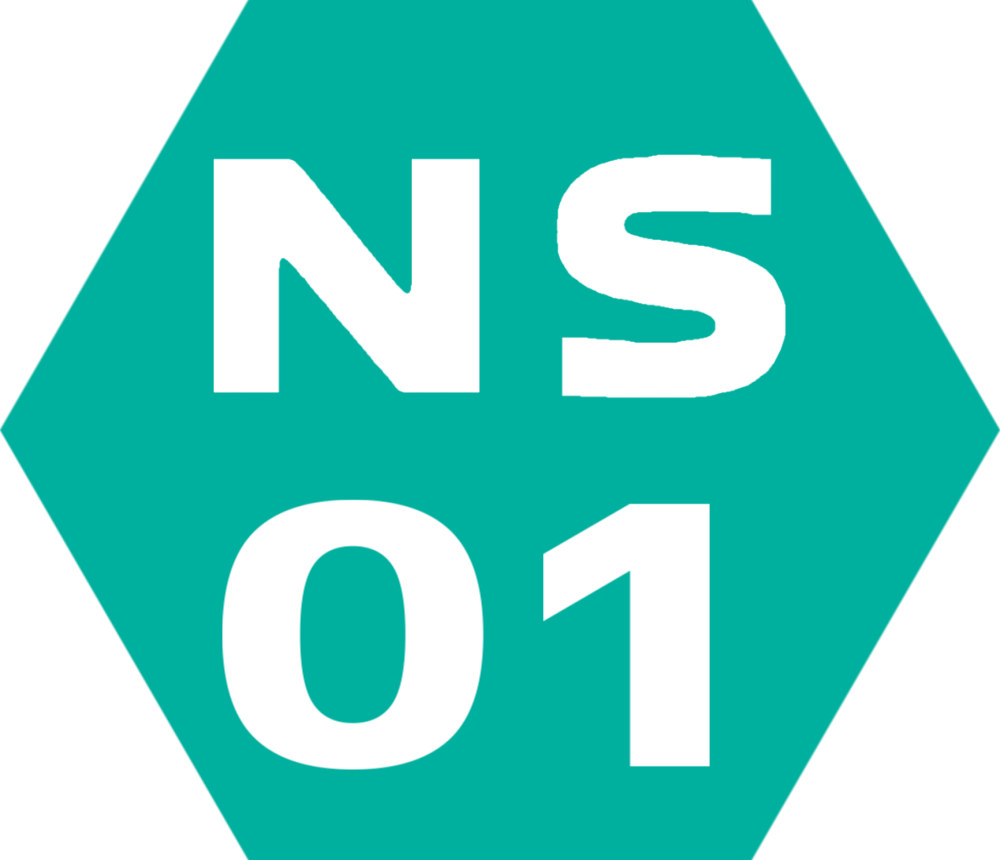
OMYJK47 JA26 JU07 JS24 TD01 Ōmiya Station 大宮駅

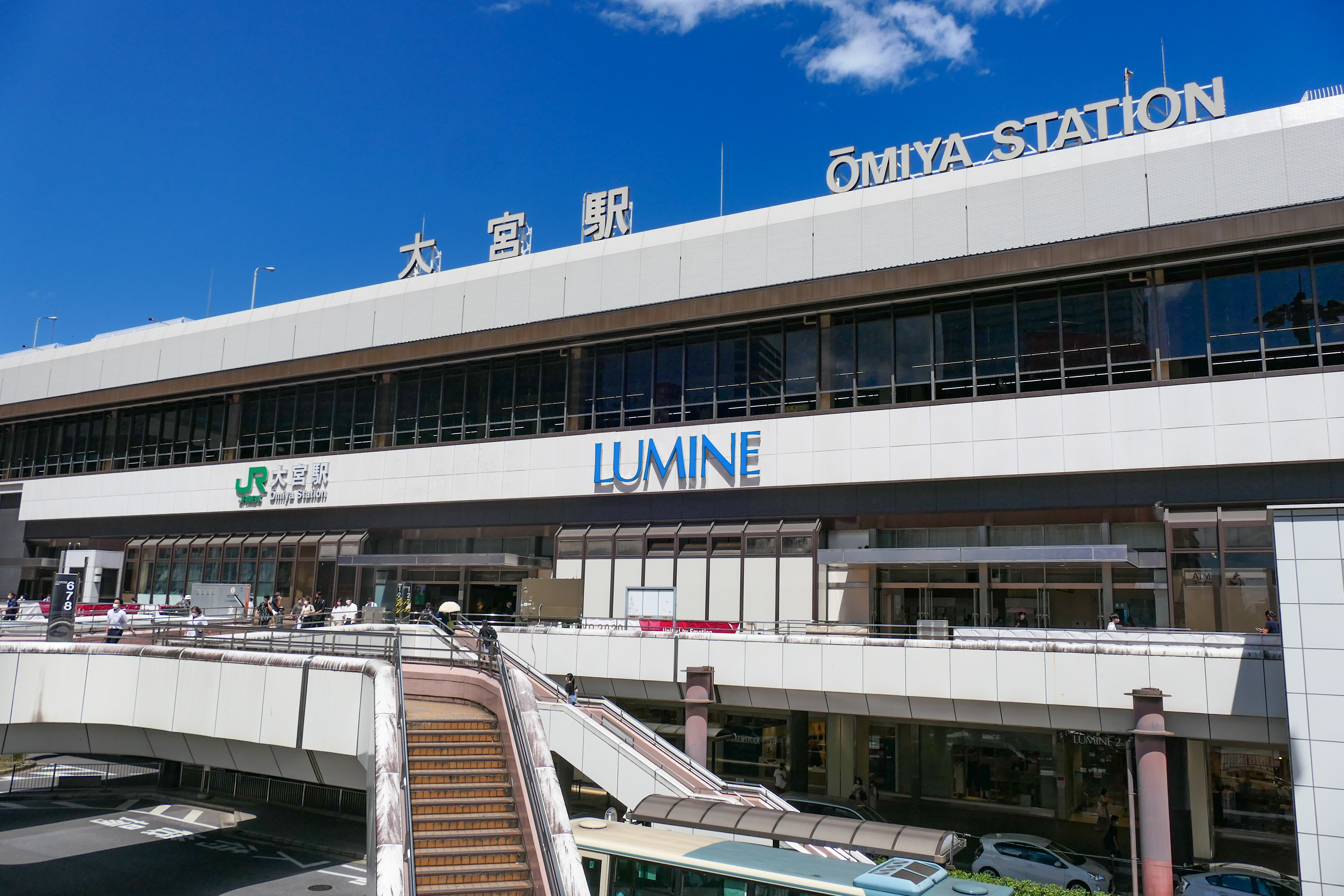
- West of Omiya Station in August 2021

General information
- Location: 630 Nishiki-chō, Ōmiya-ku, Saitama-shi, Saitama-ken 330-0853; Japan
- Coordinates: 35°54′23″N 139°37′26″E
- Operator: JR East; Tobu Railway; Saitama New Urban Transit
- Platforms: 11 island platforms, 2 bay platforms
- Connections: Bus terminal

Other information
- Status: Staffed (Midori no Madoguchi)
- Station code: OMY; JK47; JA26; JU07; JS24; TD01; NS01

History
- Opened: 16 March 1885; 141 years ago

Passengers
- 257,344 daily (JR East, FY2019); 135,984 (Tōbu, FY2019)

Services
Preceding station	JR East	Following station
Ueno towards Tokyo	Tōhoku Shinkansen Hayabusa	Sendai towards Shin-Aomori
Ueno towards Tokyo	Tōhoku Shinkansen Yamabiko	Oyama towards Morioka
Ueno towards Tokyo	Tōhoku Shinkansen Nasuno	Oyama towards Kōriyama
Ueno towards Tokyo	Yamagata Shinkansen Tsubasa	Utsunomiya towards Shinjō
Ueno towards Tokyo	Akita Shinkansen Komachi	Sendai towards Akita
Ueno towards Tokyo	Jōetsu Shinkansen Toki	Kumagaya towards Niigata
Ueno towards Tokyo	Jōetsu Shinkansen Tanigawa	Kumagaya towards Gala-Yuzawa
Ueno towards Tokyo	Hokuriku Shinkansen Kagayaki	Nagano Terminus
Ueno towards Tokyo	Hokuriku Shinkansen Hakutaka	Takasaki towards Jōetsumyōkō
Ueno towards Tokyo	Hokuriku Shinkansen Asama	Kumagaya towards Nagano
Other services
Preceding station	JR East	Following station
Saitama-Shintoshin JK46 towards Yokohama	Keihin–Tōhoku Line Rapid Local	Terminus
Urawa towards Ueno	Kusatsu	Kumagaya towards Naganohara-Kusatsuguchi
Urawa (through-service) towards Ueno	Akagi	Ageo towards Takasaki
Ikebukuro (one-way service) towards Shinjuku	Akagi	Ageo towards Takasaki
Urawa One-way operation	Utsunomiya Line Rapid Rabbit	Higashi-Ōmiya towards Utsunomiya
Saitama-Shintoshin JU06 towards Tokyo	Utsunomiya Line Local	Toro towards Kuroiso
Urawa One-way operation	Takasaki Line Rapid Urban	Ageo towards Takasaki
Saitama-Shintoshin JU06 towards Tokyo	Takasaki Line Local	Miyahara towards Maebashi
Urawa towards Shinjuku	Nikkō and Kinugawa	Tochigi TN11 towards Tōbu Nikkō or Kinugawa-Onsen
Urawa towards Odawara or Zushi	Shōnan–Shinjuku Line Special Rapid	Ageo towards Takasaki
Urawa towards Odawara or Zushi	Shōnan–Shinjuku Line Rapid	Miyahara towards Maebashi
Urawa towards Odawara or Zushi	Shōnan–Shinjuku Line Rapid	Hasuda towards Utsunomiya
Urawa towards Odawara or Zushi	Shōnan–Shinjuku Line Local	Toro towards Utsunomiya
Musashi-Urawa JA21 towards Ōsaki	Saikyō Line Commuter Rapid	through to Kawagoe Line
Kita-Yono JA25 towards Ōsaki	Saikyō Line Rapid Local	through to Kawagoe Line
through to Saikyō Line	Kawagoe Line Commuter Rapid Rapid Local	Nisshin towards Kawagoe
Kita-Asaka JM28 towards Fuchūhommachi or Hachiōji	Musashino	Terminus
Terminus	Shimōsa	Musashi-Urawa JM26 towards Kaihimmakuhari
Preceding station	Tobu Railway	Following station
Terminus	Urban Park Liner from Asakusa	Iwatsuki One-way operation
Terminus	Urban Park Liner	Iwatsuki TD06 towards Kashiwa
Terminus	Tōbu Urban Park Line Express	Iwatsuki TD06 towards Funabashi
Terminus	Tōbu Urban Park Line Section Express	Iwatsuki TD06 towards Kashiwa
Terminus	Tōbu Urban Park Line Local	Kita-Ōmiya TD02 towards Funabashi
Preceding station	New Shuttle	Following station
Terminus	New Shuttle	Tetsudō-Hakubutsukan towards Uchijuku
Location
- Location within Saitama city Location within Saitama Prefecture Location within Japan

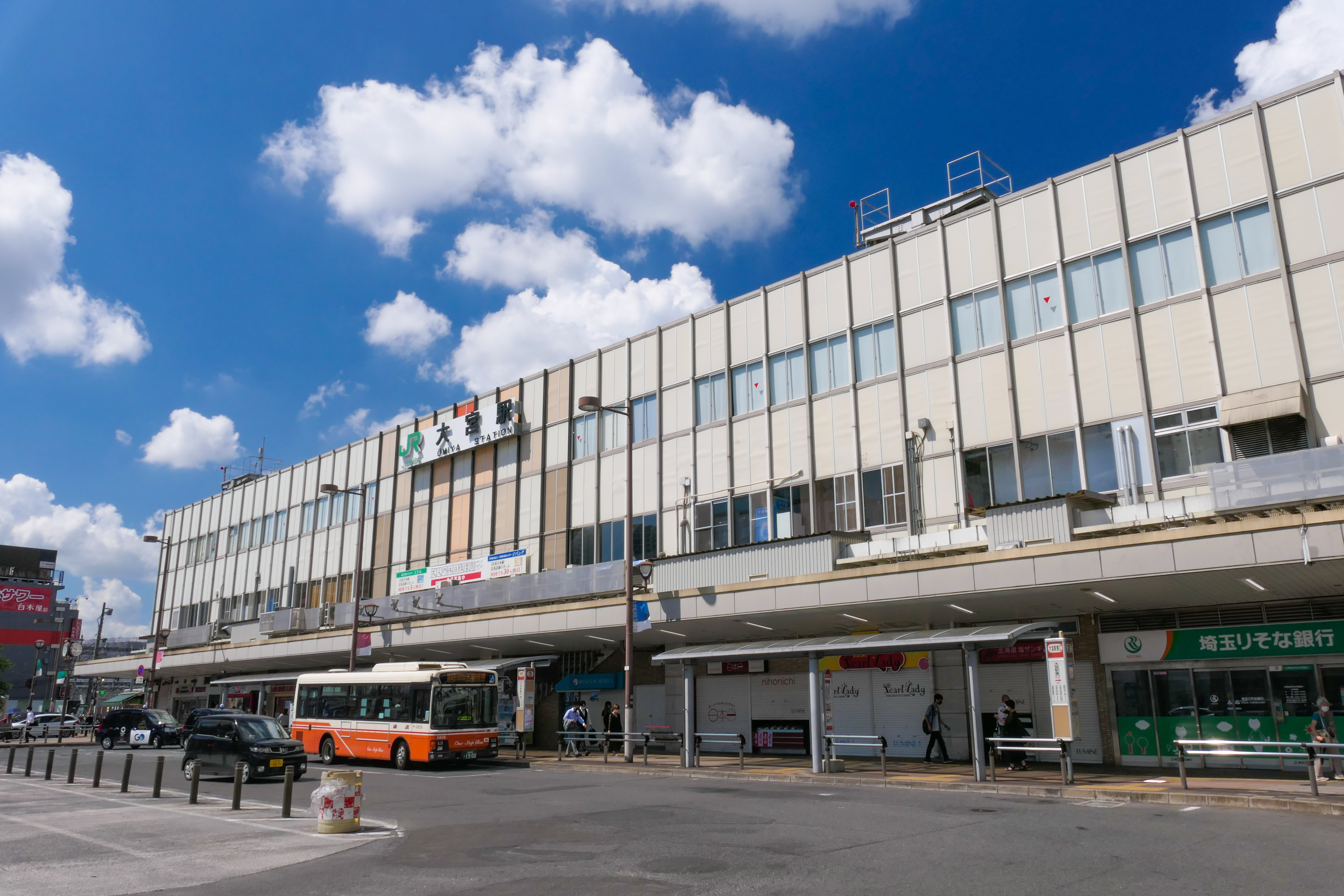
East of Omiya Station in July 2021

Ōmiya Station (大宮駅, Ōmiya-eki) is a major interchange railway station in Ōmiya-ku, Saitama, Japan, jointly operated by East Japan Railway Company (JR East), Saitama New Urban Transit and private railway operator Tōbu Railway. It is the busiest JR East station in Saitama Prefecture.

== Lines ==
The following lines serve the station:

=== JR East ===
- Tōhoku Shinkansen
- Hokkaidō Shinkansen
- Yamagata Shinkansen
- Akita Shinkansen
- Jōetsu Shinkansen
- Hokuriku Shinkansen
- Tōhoku Main Line (Utsunomiya Line)
- Takasaki Line
- Shōnan-Shinjuku Line
- Ueno-Tokyo Line
- Keihin-Tōhoku Line
- Saikyō Line
- ■ Kawagoe Line

=== Tobu Railway ===
- Tobu Urban Park Line

=== Saitama New Urban Transit ===
- New Shuttle

== Station layout ==
=== JR East platforms ===
==== No. 1–11 ====
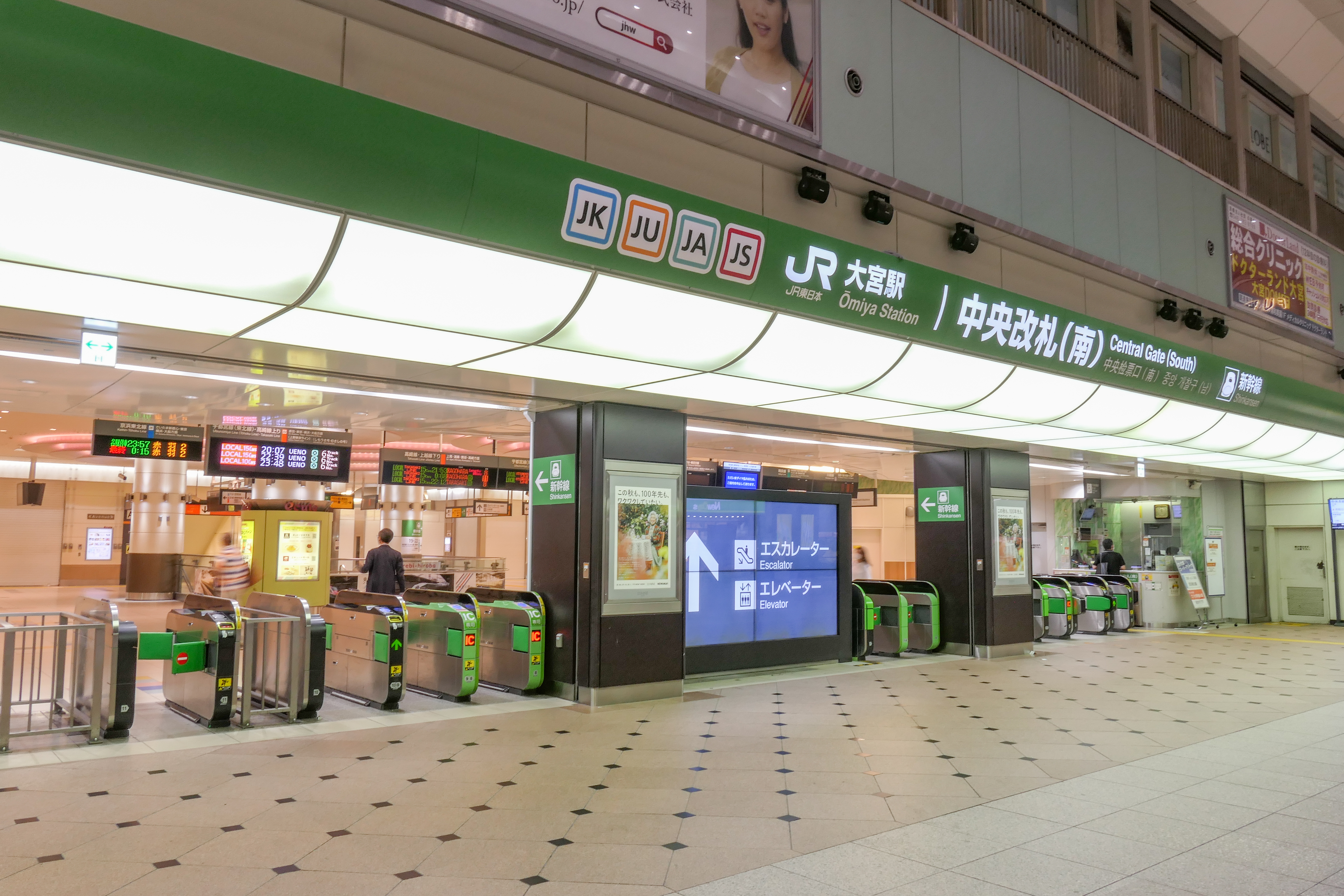
Central south gate in July 2022

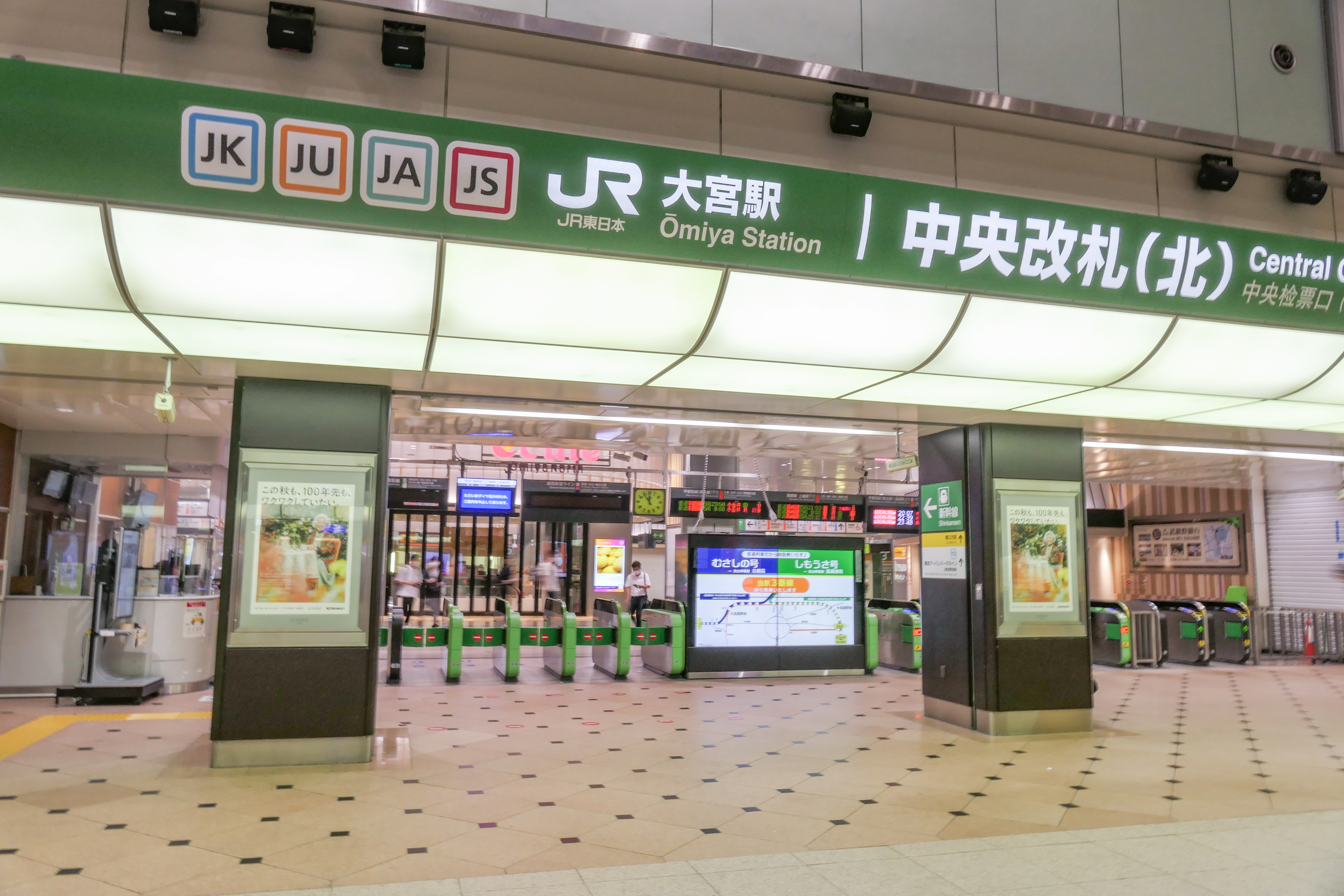
Central north gate in July 2022

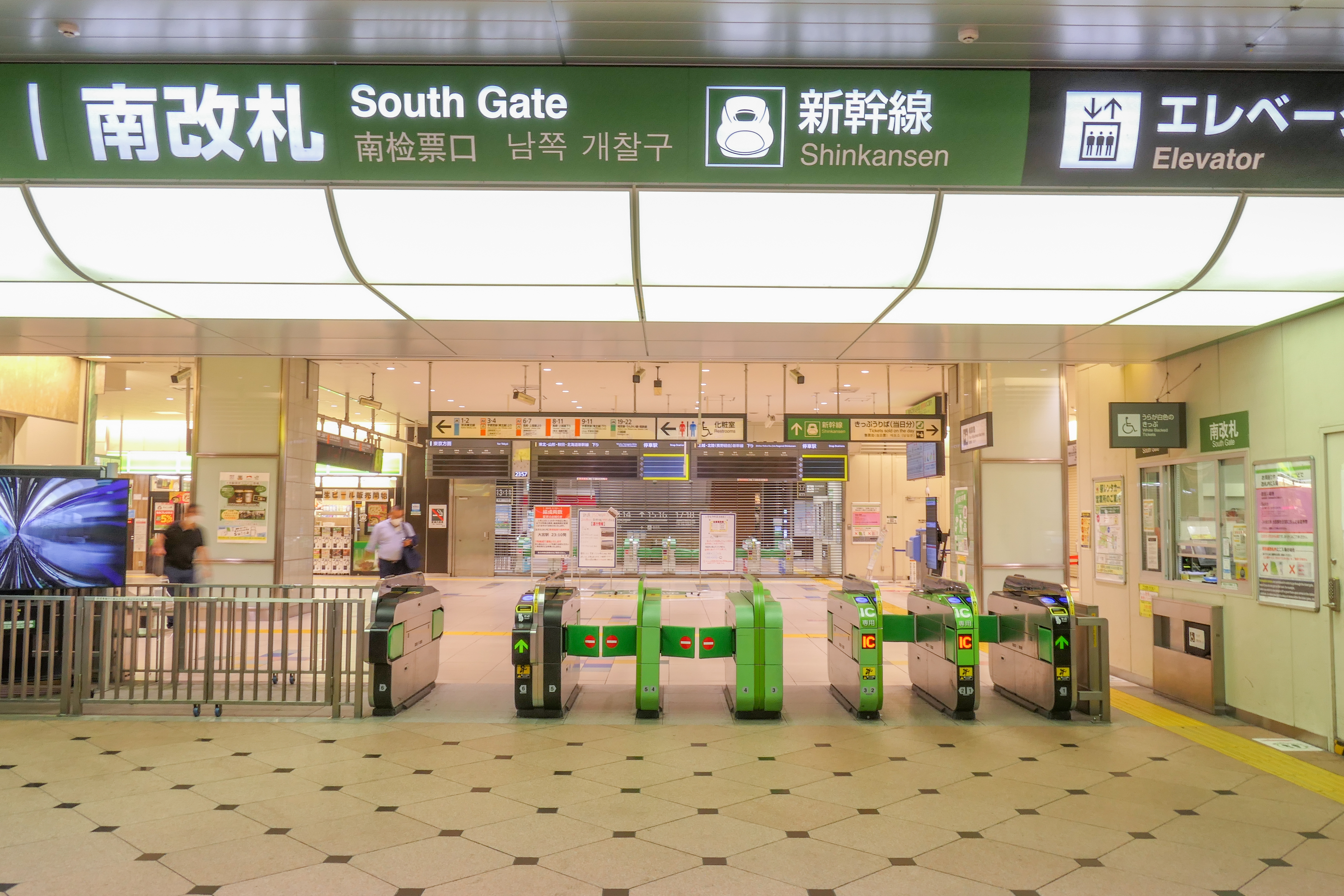
South gate in July 2022

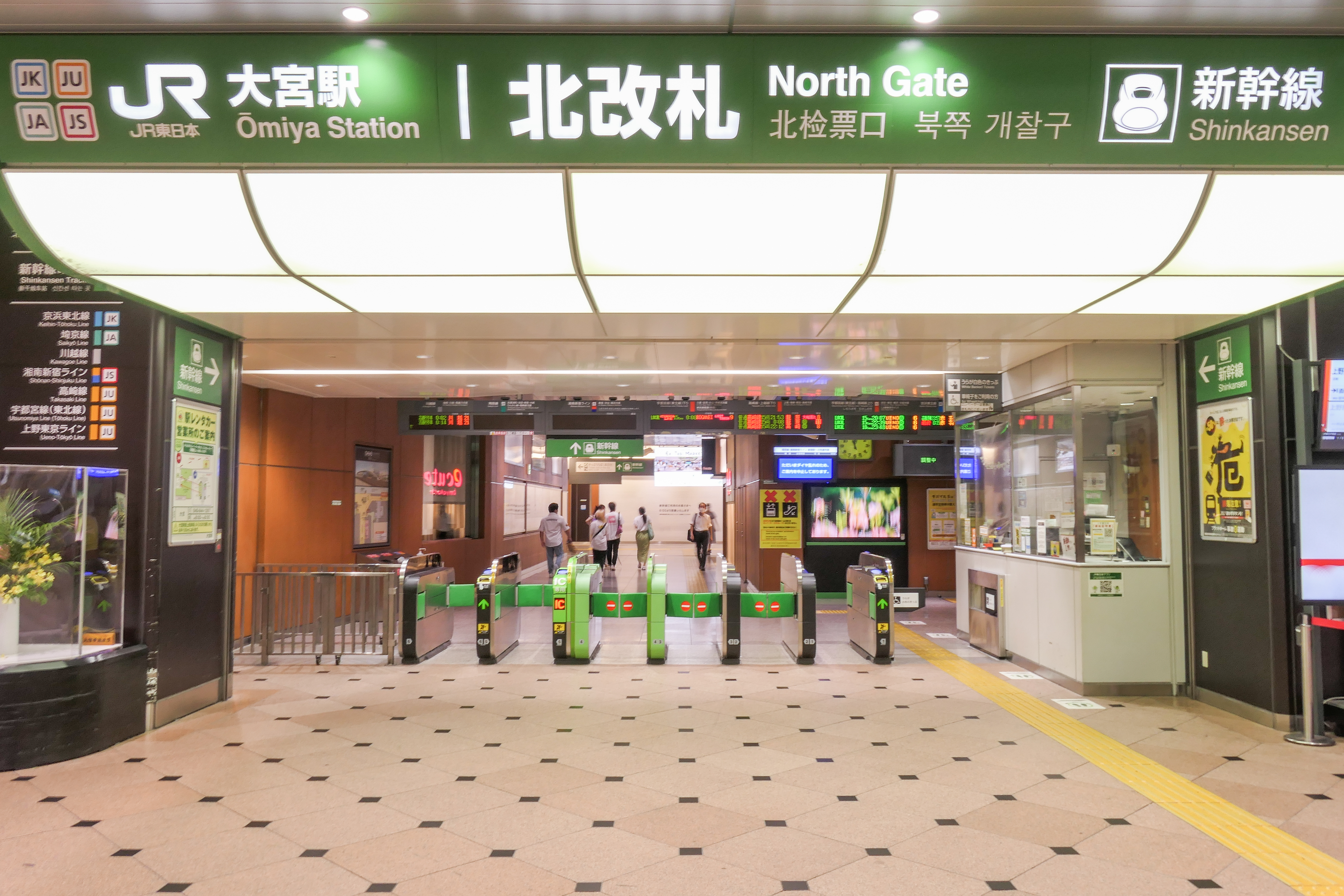
North gate in July 2022

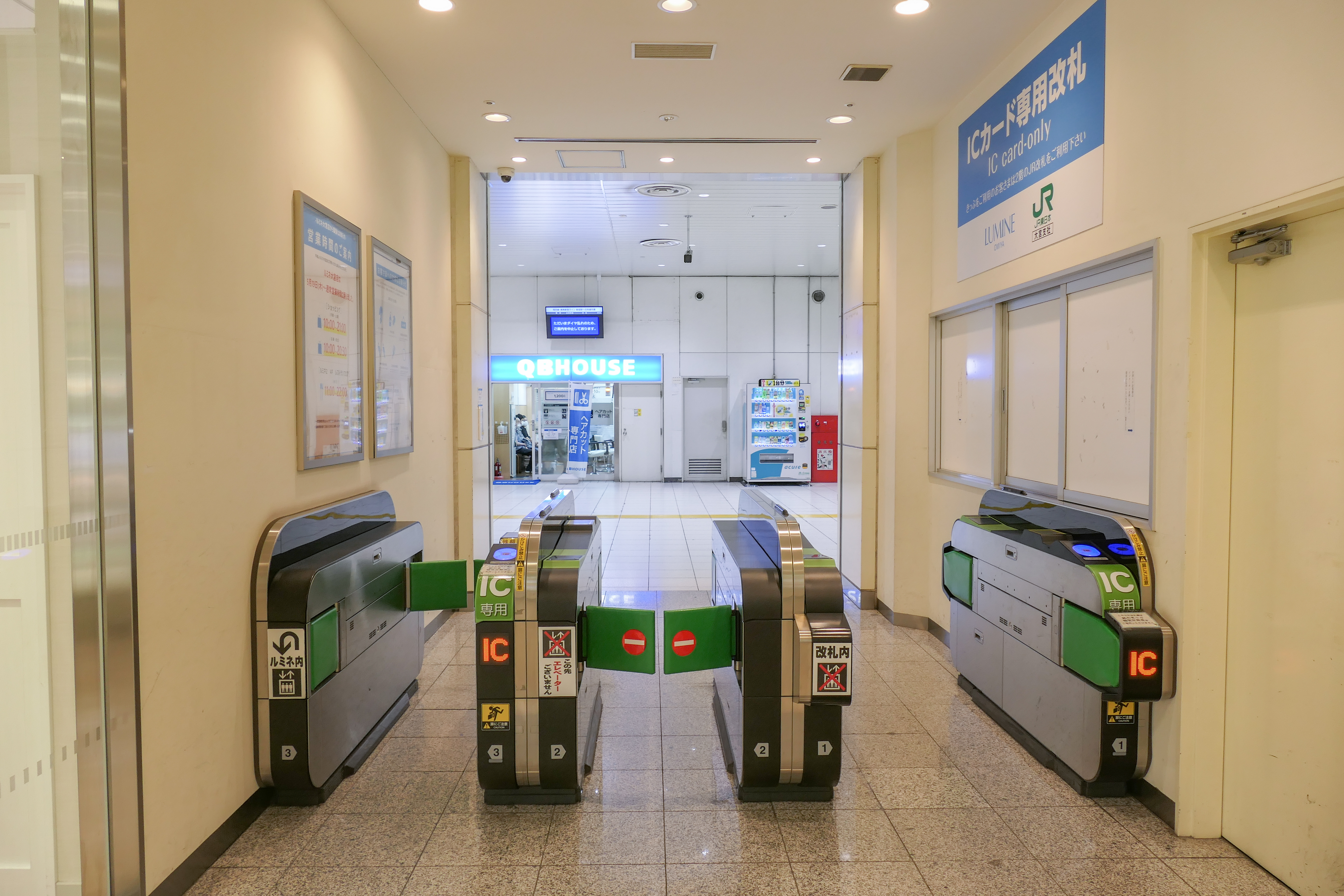
LUMINE south gate in August 2022

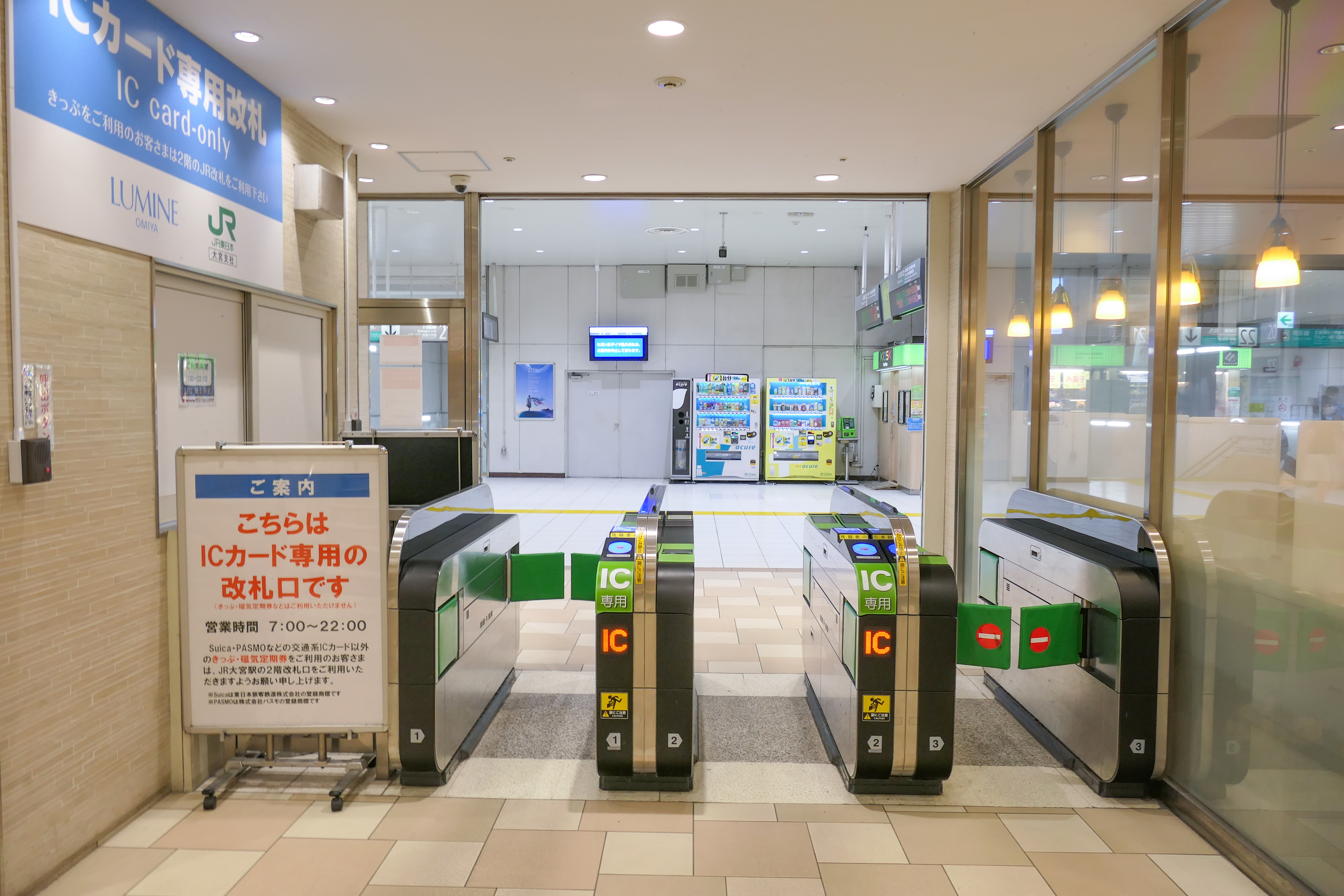
LUMINE north gate in August 2022

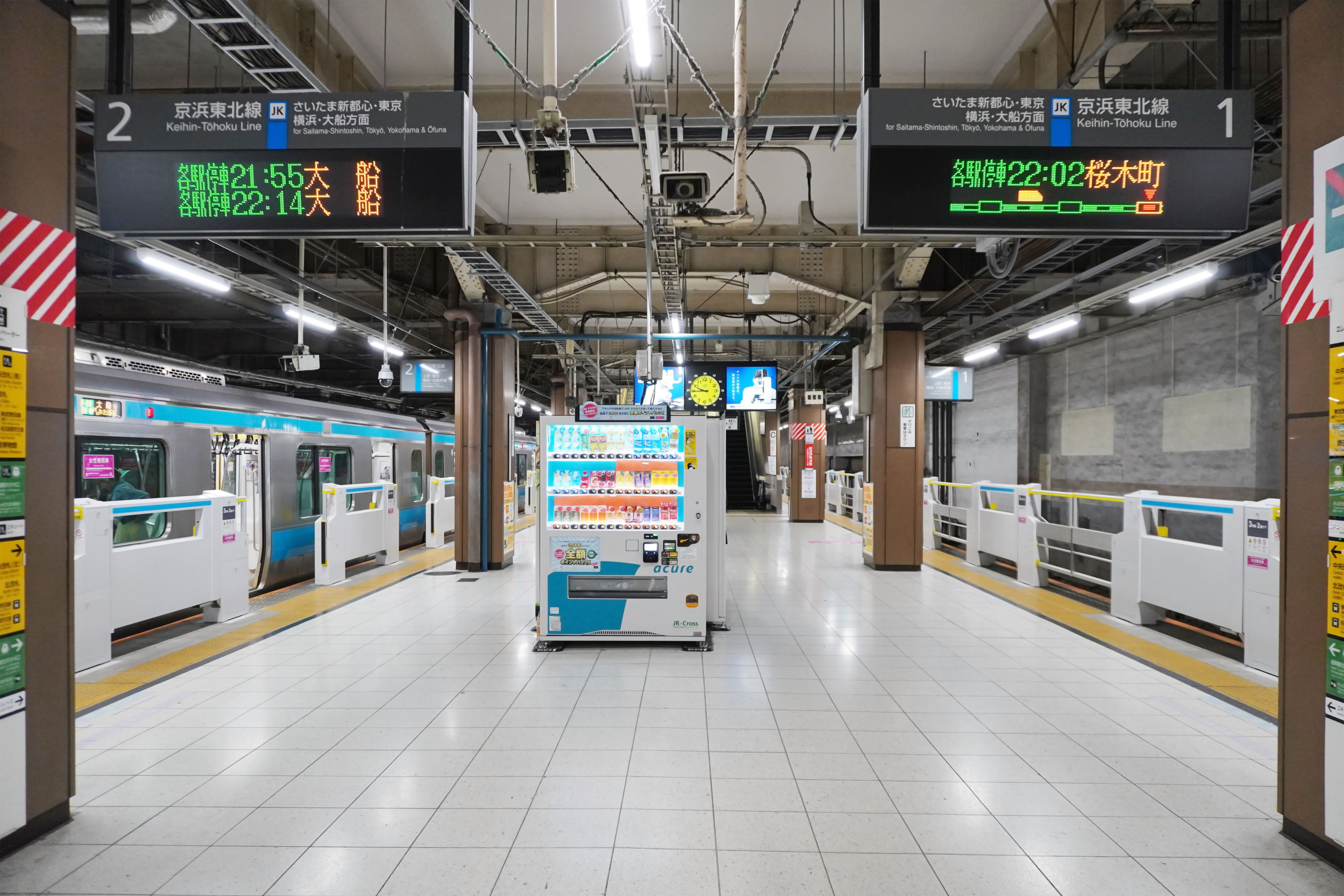
Keihin-Tōhoku Line platform in March 2024

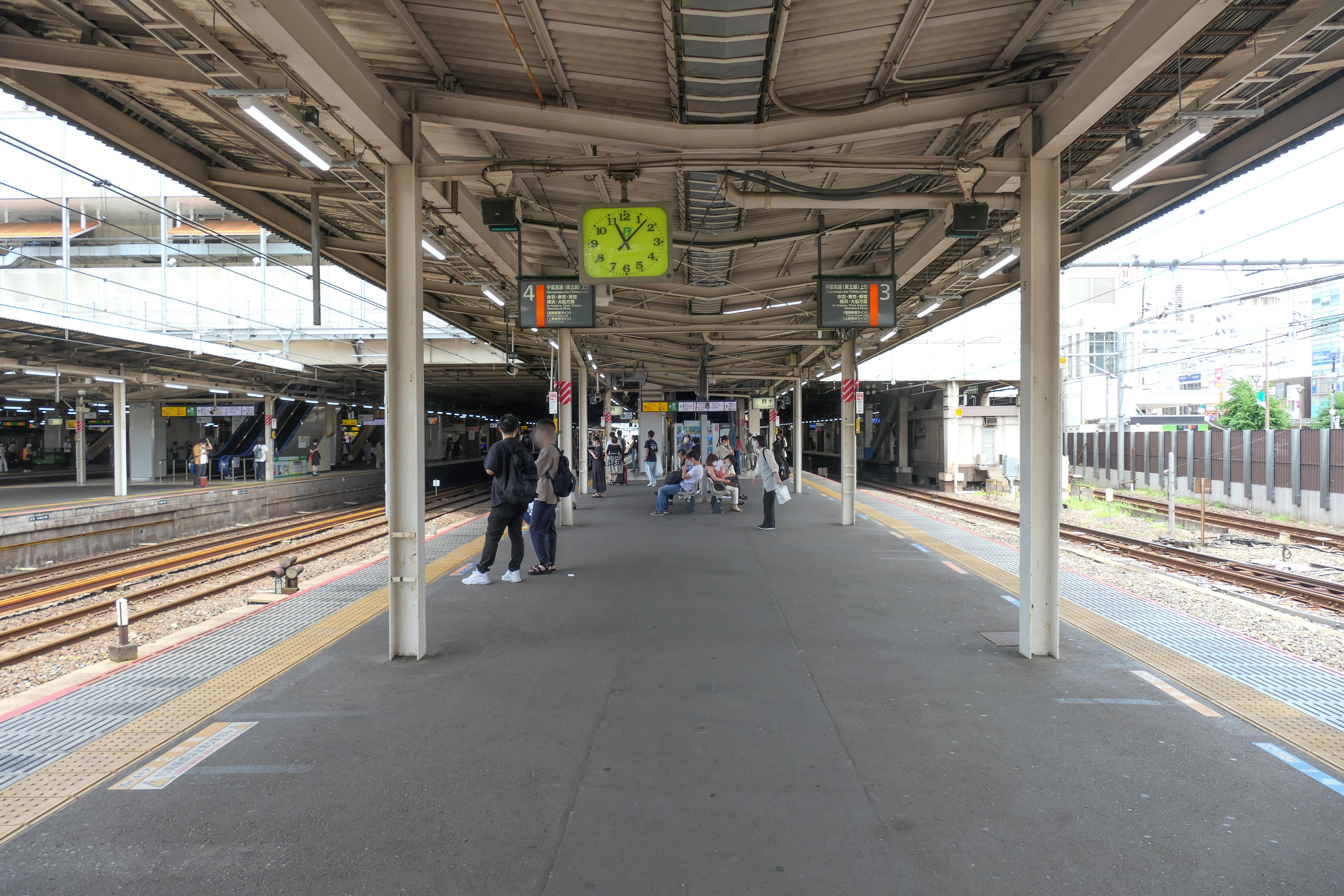
Utsunomiya Line platform in July 2021

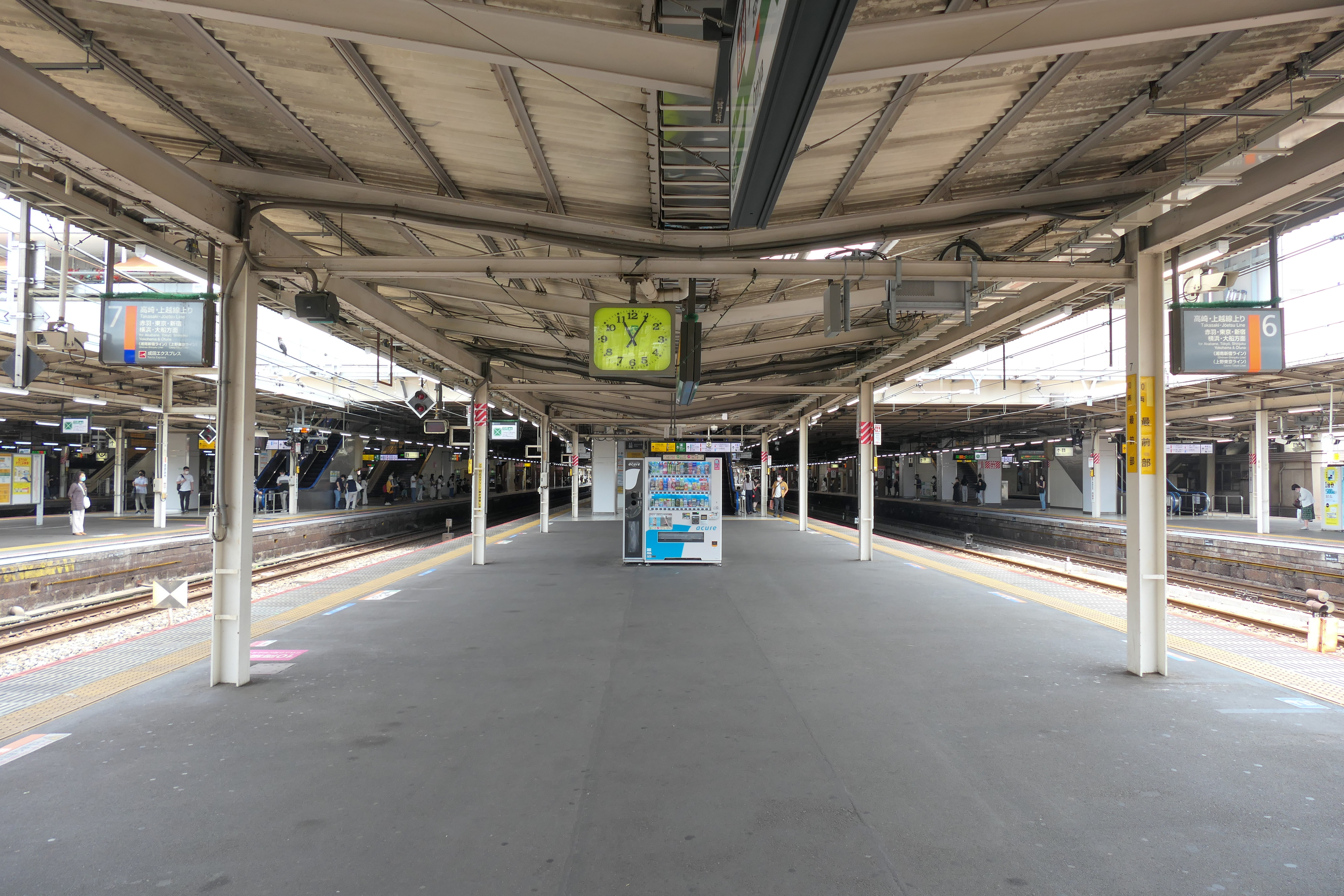
Takasaki Line platform in July 2021

These are five ground-level island platforms. Tracks 5 and 10 are through tracks not served by platforms.

1, 2	Keihin-Tōhoku Line	for Akabane, Ueno, Tokyo, Yokohama, and Ōfuna
3, 4	Utsunomiya Line (Ueno-Tokyo Line)	for Ueno, Tokyo, Yokohama, Ōfuna, Atami, Numazu and Ito (via Tokaido Line and Itō Line)
3, 4	Shōnan-Shinjuku Line	for Shinjuku, Yokohama, Ōfuna and Zushi (via Yokosuka Line)
3, 4	■ Musashino	for Kita-Asaka, Tachikawa, and Hachioji (via Musashino Line and Chūō Line (Rapid))
3, 4	■ Shimōsa	for Minami-Koshigaya, Shim-Matsudo, Nishi-Funabashi, and Kaihimmakuhari (via Musashino Line)
6, 7	Takasaki Line (Ueno-Tokyo Line)	for Ueno, Tokyo, Yokohama, Ōfuna, Atami, Numazu and Itō (via Tōkaidō Line and Ito Line)
6, 7	Shōnan-Shinjuku Line	for Shinjuku, Yokohama, Ōfuna, Hiratsuka, and Odawara (via Tōkaidō Line)
6, 7	■ Ltd. Exp. Narita Express	for Shinjuku, Tokyo and Narita Airport
8	■ Takasaki Line	for Kumagaya, Takasaki and Maebashi
8	■ Ltd. Exp. Kusatsu	for Takasaki and Naganohara-Kusatsuguchi
8	■ Ltd. Exp. Minakami	for Takasaki and Minakami
8	■ Ltd. Exp. Akagi & Swallow Akagi	for Takasaki and Maebashi
9	■ Utsunomiya Line	for Oyama, Utsunomiya and Kuroiso
11	■ Utsunomiya Line	for Oyama, Utsunomiya and Kuroiso
11	■ Takasaki Line	for Kumagaya, Takasaki, and Maebashi

==== No. 13–18 ====
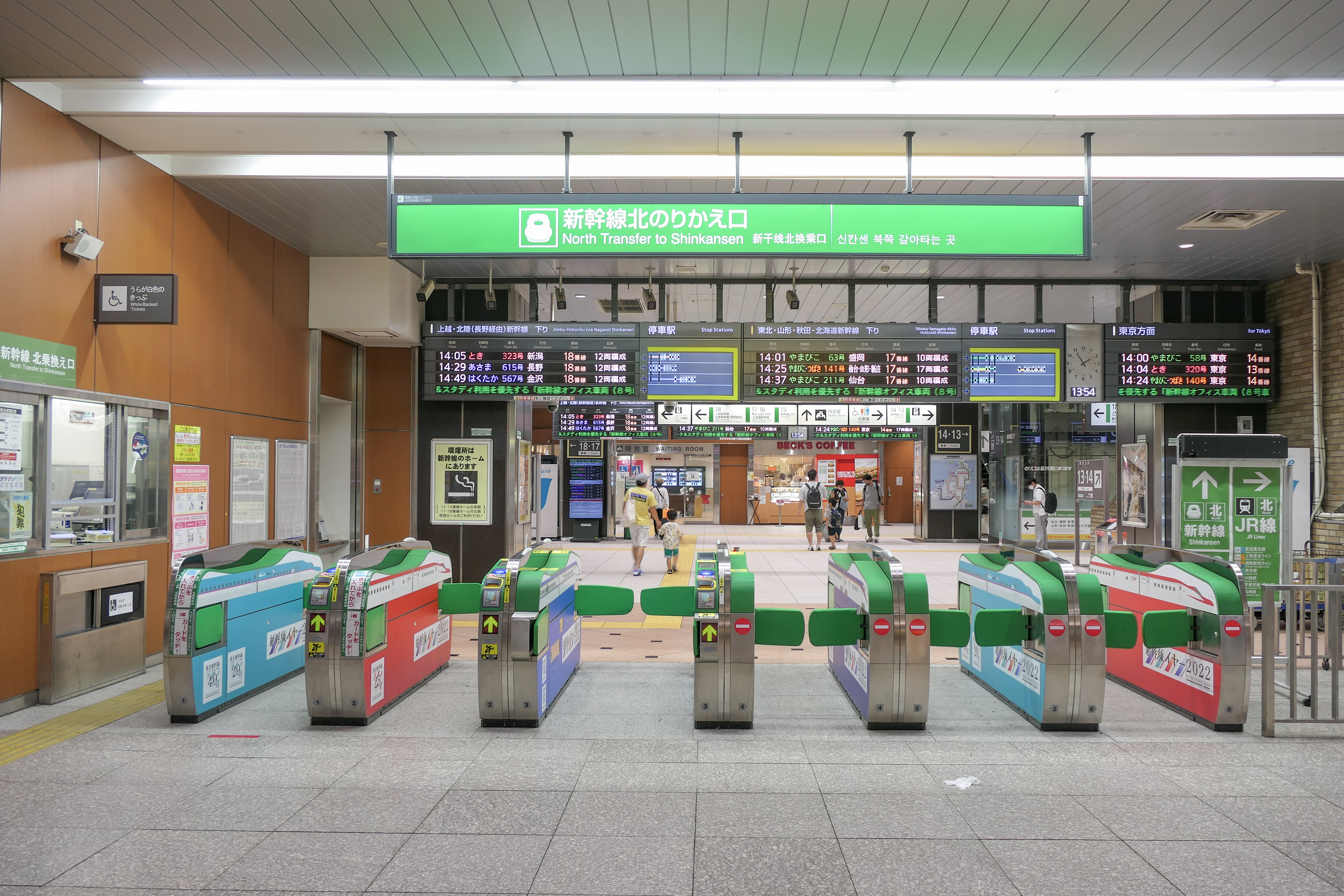
Shinkansen north transfer gate in August 2022

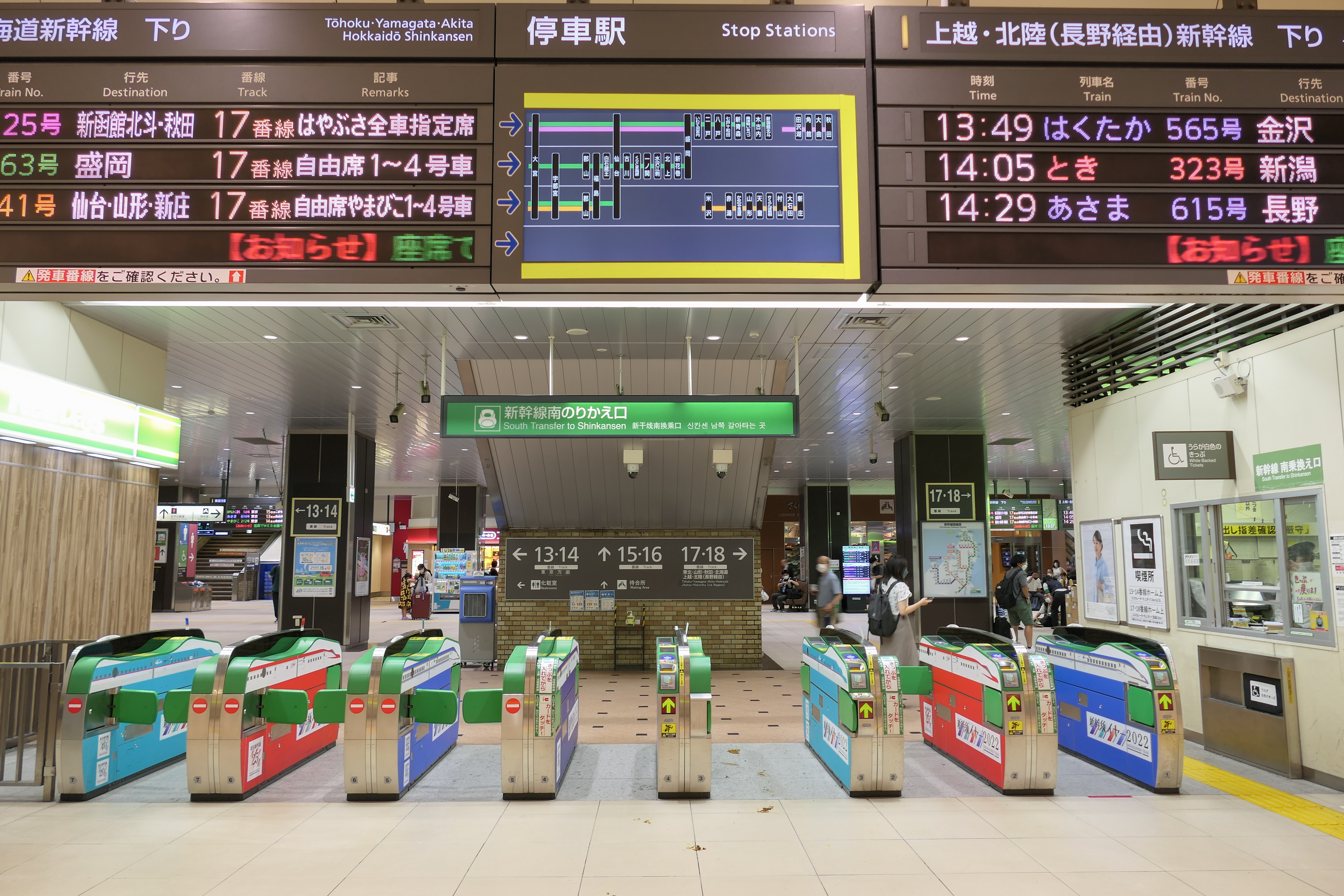
Shinkansen south transfer gate in August 2022

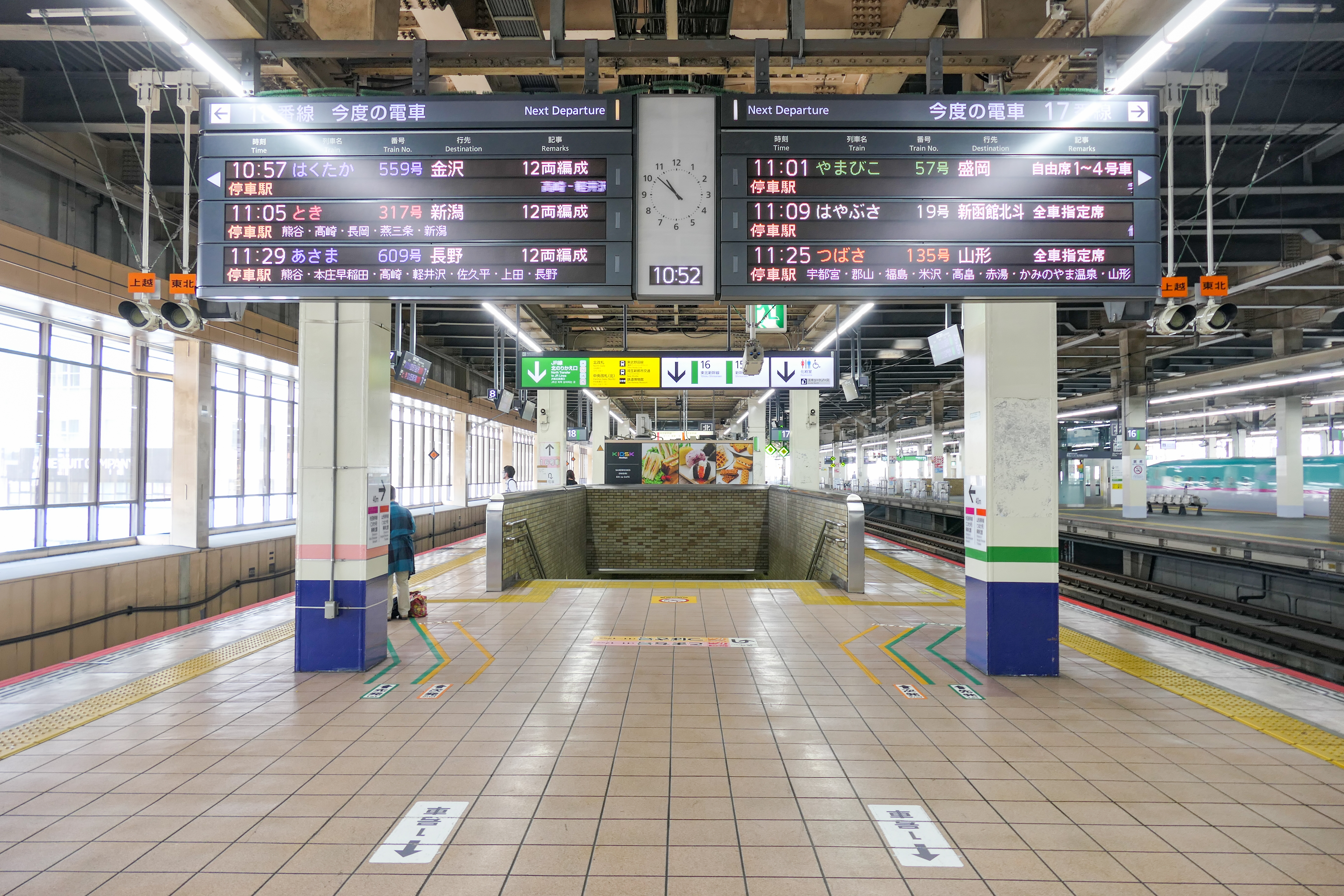
Shinkansen platforms in June 2022

These are three elevated island platforms at the third-floor level.

13-15	■ Shinkansen	for Ueno and Tokyo
16	■ Tōhoku Shinkansen (extra trains)	for Utsunomiya, Fukushima, Sendai, Morioka, and Shin-Aomori
17	■ Tōhoku・Hokkaidō Shinkansen	for Sendai, Morioka, Shin-Aomori and Shin-Hakodate-Hokuto
17	■ Yamagata Shinkansen Tsubasa	for Fukushima, Yamagata and Shinjō
17	■ Akita Shinkansen Komachi	for Morioka and Akita
18	■ Jōetsu Shinkansen	for Takasaki, Echigo-Yuzawa and Niigata
18	■ Hokuriku Shinkansen	for Takasaki, Nagano, Toyama, and Kanazawa

==== No. 19–22 ====
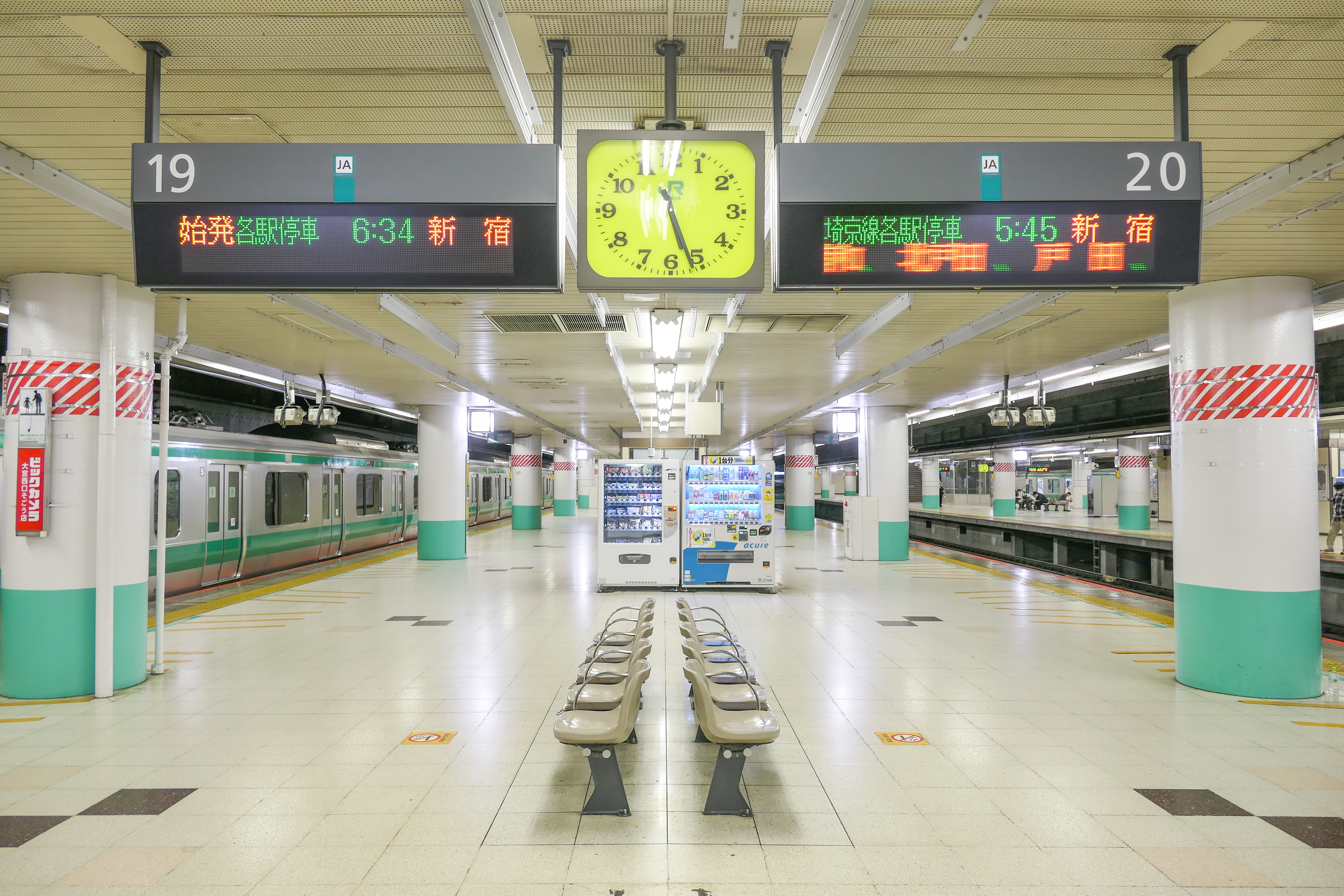
The underground Saikyō/Kawagoe Line platforms in July 2022

These are two underground island platforms.

19-20	Saikyō Line	for Musashi-Urawa, Ikebukuro, Shinjuku, Ōsaki; Rinkai Line for Shin-Kiba
21	■ Kawagoe Line	for Sashiogi and Kawagoe
22	Saikyō Line	for Musashi-Urawa, Ikebukuro, Shinjuku, Ōsaki; Rinkai Line for Shin-Kiba
22	■ Kawagoe Line	for Sashiogi and Kawagoe

=== Tōbu platforms ===
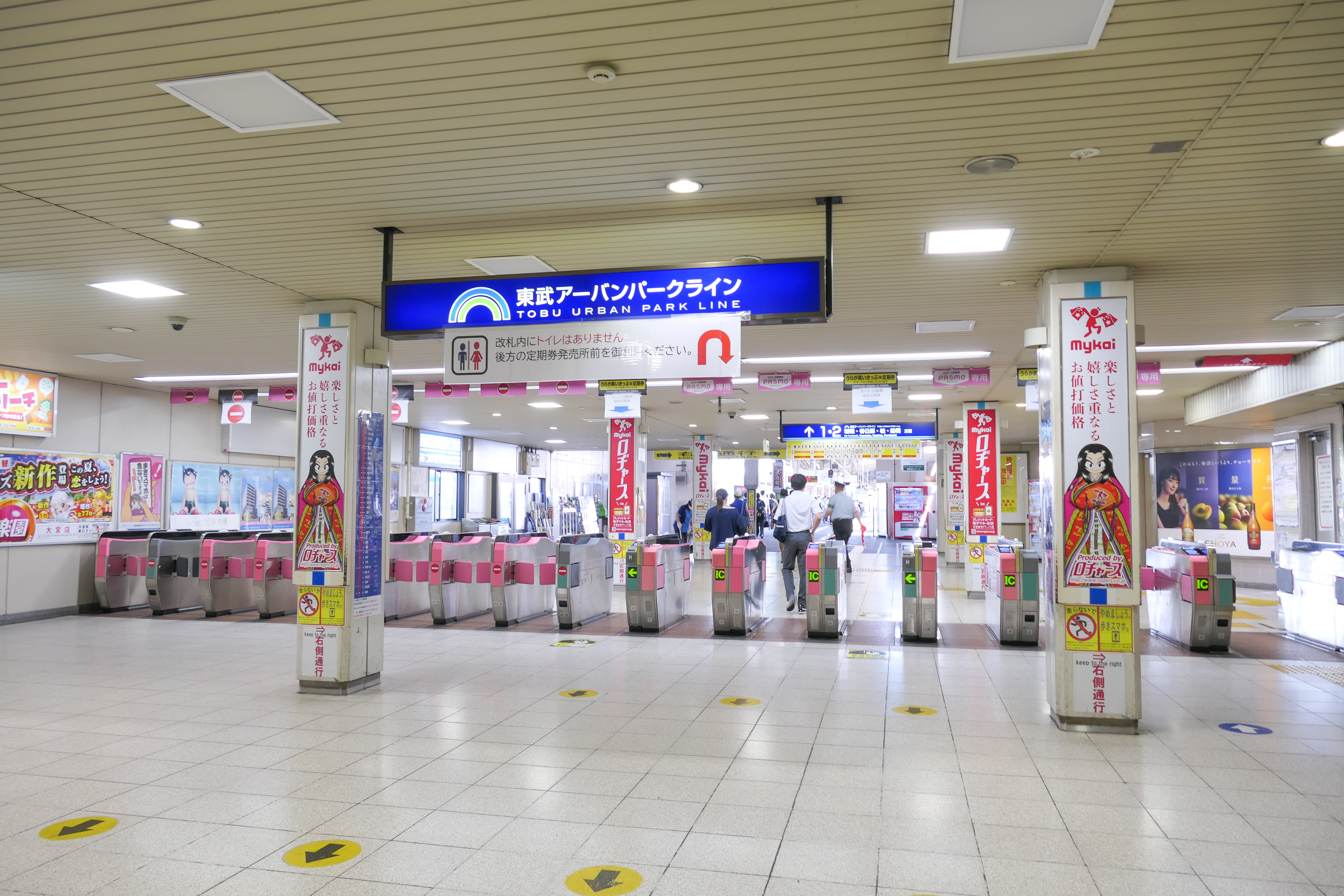
Tōbu Line ticket gate in July 2021

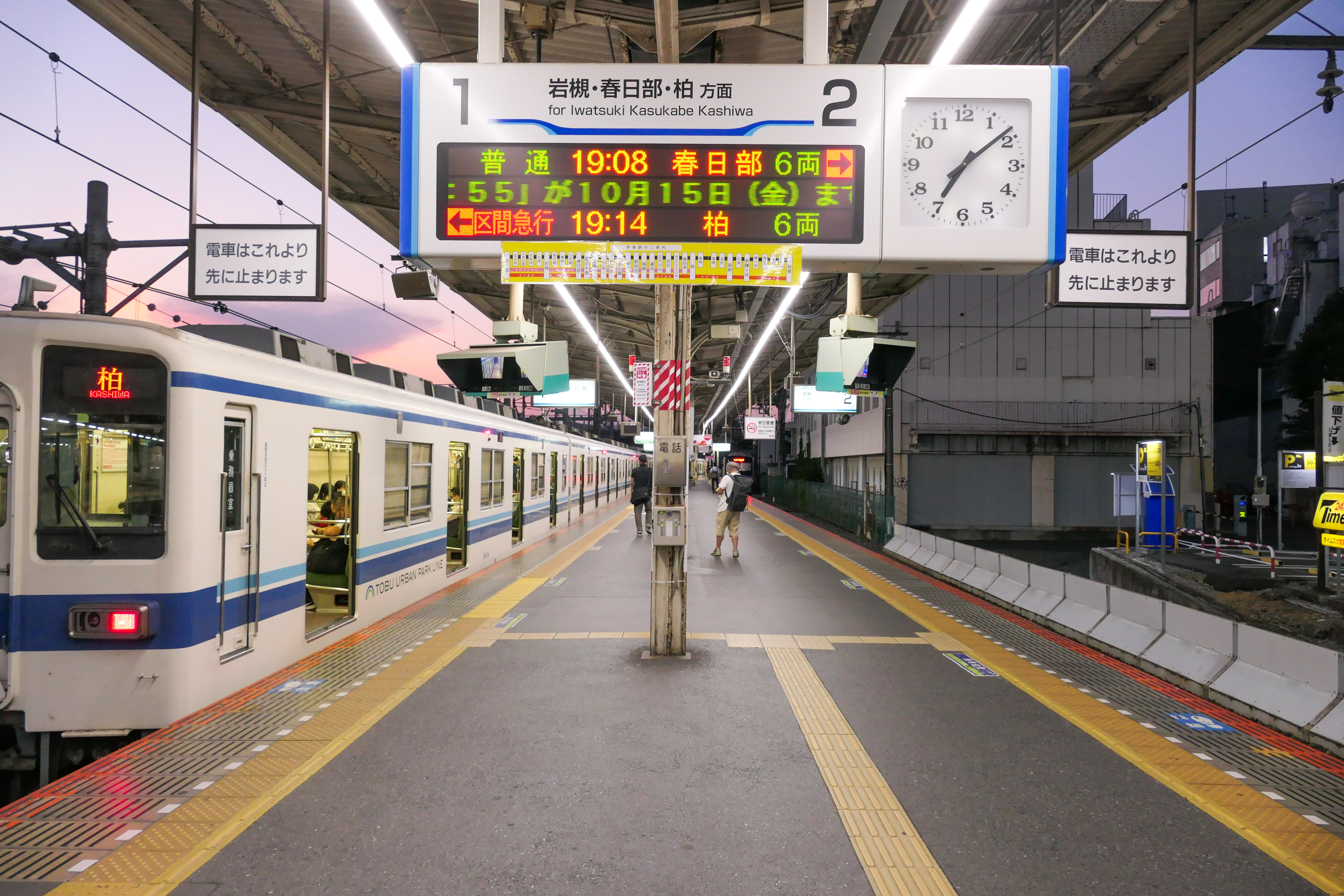
The Tōbu platforms in July 2021

These platforms are bay platforms.

1/2	Tōbu Urban Park Line	for Iwatsuki, Kasukabe, Nodashi, Kashiwa, and Funabashi

=== New Shuttle platform ===
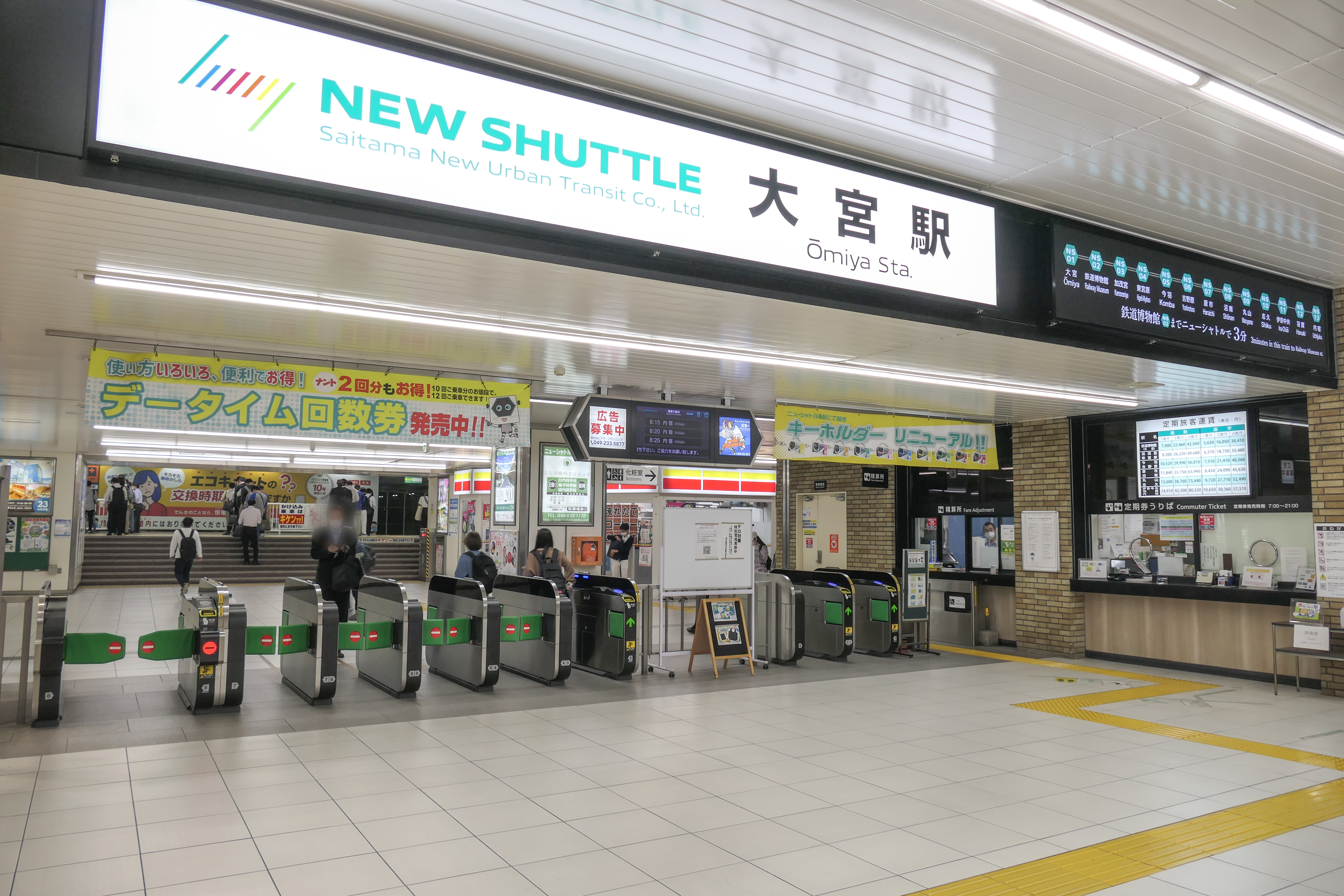
The New Shuttle ticket gate in June 2022

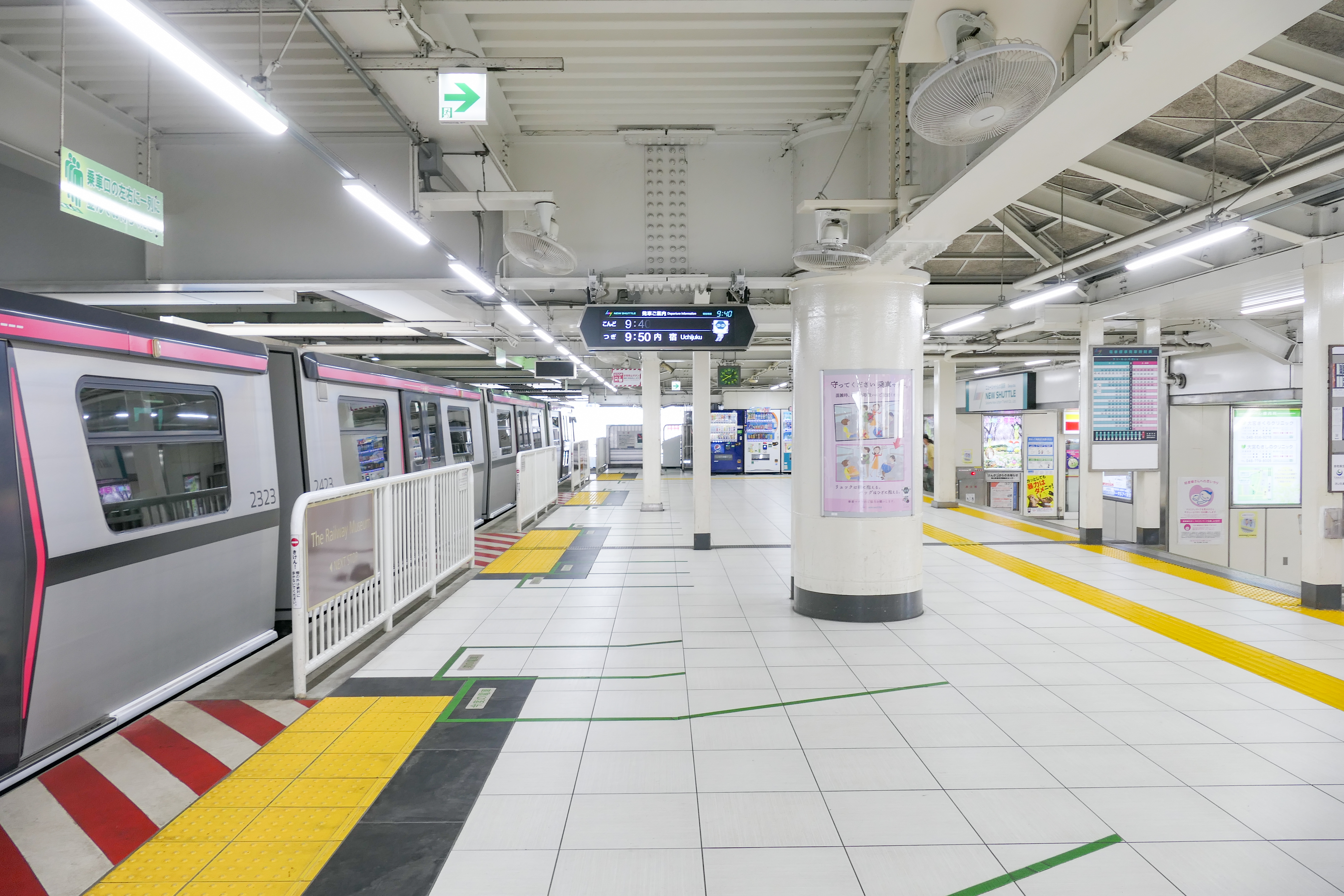
The New Shuttle platform in August 2022

A single platform on the middle of a balloon loop.

■ Ina Line (New Shuttle)	for Uchijuku

== History ==
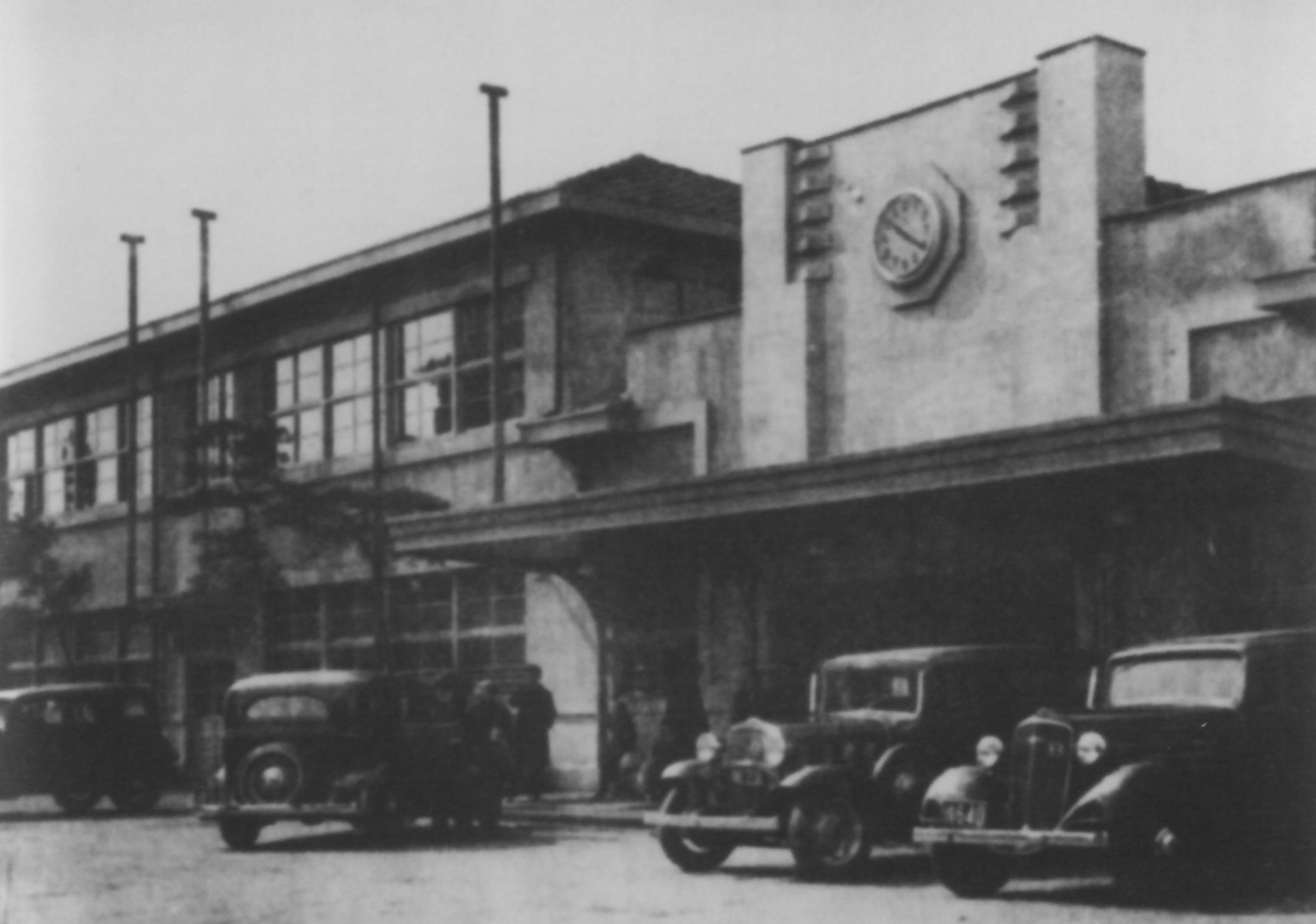
Ōmiya Station in 1934

Ōmiya Station opened on 16 March 1885 as a station of Nippon Railway.

In 1894, a railway workshop was opened to the north of the station, and this facility is still operated by JR East and Japan Freight Railway Company.

== Passenger statistics ==
In fiscal 2019, the JR East station was used by an average of 257,344 passengers daily (boarding passengers only), making it the busiest station operated by JR East in Saitama Prefecture and the eighth-busiest station on the JR East network as a whole. The JR East passenger figures for previous years are as shown below. In fiscal 2019, the Tobu station was used by an average of 135,984 passengers daily.

Fiscal year	Daily average
1999	228,571
2000	228,219
2001	227,835
2002	228,247
2003	227,683
2004	228,271
2005	231,599
2006	233,719
2007	239,111
2008	239,720
2009	236,424
2010	235,151
2011	235,744
2012	240,143

== Surrounding area ==
- The Railway Museum

Local and late-night buses and intercity coaches, including ones to Narita International Airport and Haneda Airport, also depart from this station.

== See also ==
- List of railway stations in Japan
- Ōmiya Station (Kyoto)
