= Nakada Station =

Metro station in Yokohama, Japan

Coordinates: 35°24′40.15″N 139°30′41.08″E

B04 Nakada Station 中田駅
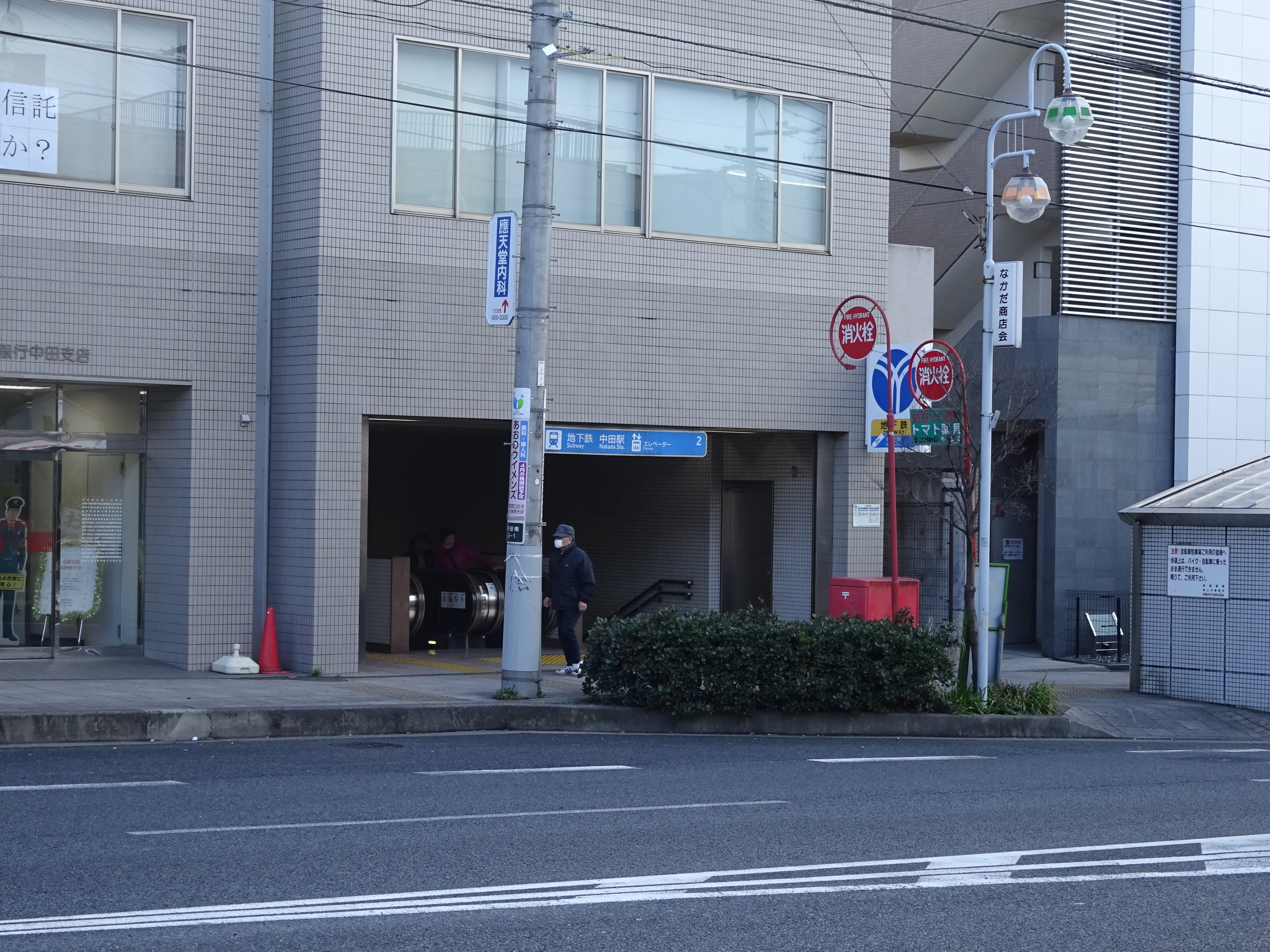
- Entrance No.2

General information
- Location: Nakada-Minami 3-1-5, Izumi, Yokohama, Kanagawa （横浜市泉区中田南三丁目1-5） Japan
- System: Yokohama Municipal Subway station
- Operator: Yokohama City Transportation Bureau
- Line: Blue Line
- Platforms: 1 island platform
- Tracks: 2

Other information
- Station code: B04

History
- Opened: 29 August 1999; 27 years ago

Passengers
- 2008: 8,094 daily

Services
Preceding station	Yokohama Municipal Subway	Following station
Tateba B03 towards Shonandai	Blue Line Rapid Local	Odoriba B05 towards Azamino
Location
- Location within Yokohama Location within Kanagawa Prefecture Location within Japan

Nakada Station (中田駅, Nakada-eki) is an underground metro station located in Izumi-ku, Yokohama, Kanagawa, Japan operated by the Yokohama Municipal Subway’s Blue Line (Line 1). It is 4.8 kilometers from the terminus of the Blue Line at Shōnandai Station.

== Lines ==
- Yokohama Municipal Subway
  - Blue Line

== Station layout ==
Nakada Station has a single underground island platform, located three stories underneath an above-ground station building. The exit gates are two stories underground, and parking lot is on the first storey underground.

=== Platforms ===
1	■ Blue Line (Yokohama)	Shōnandai
2	■ Blue Line (Yokohama)	Totsuka, Kamiōoka, Kannai, Yokohama, Azamino

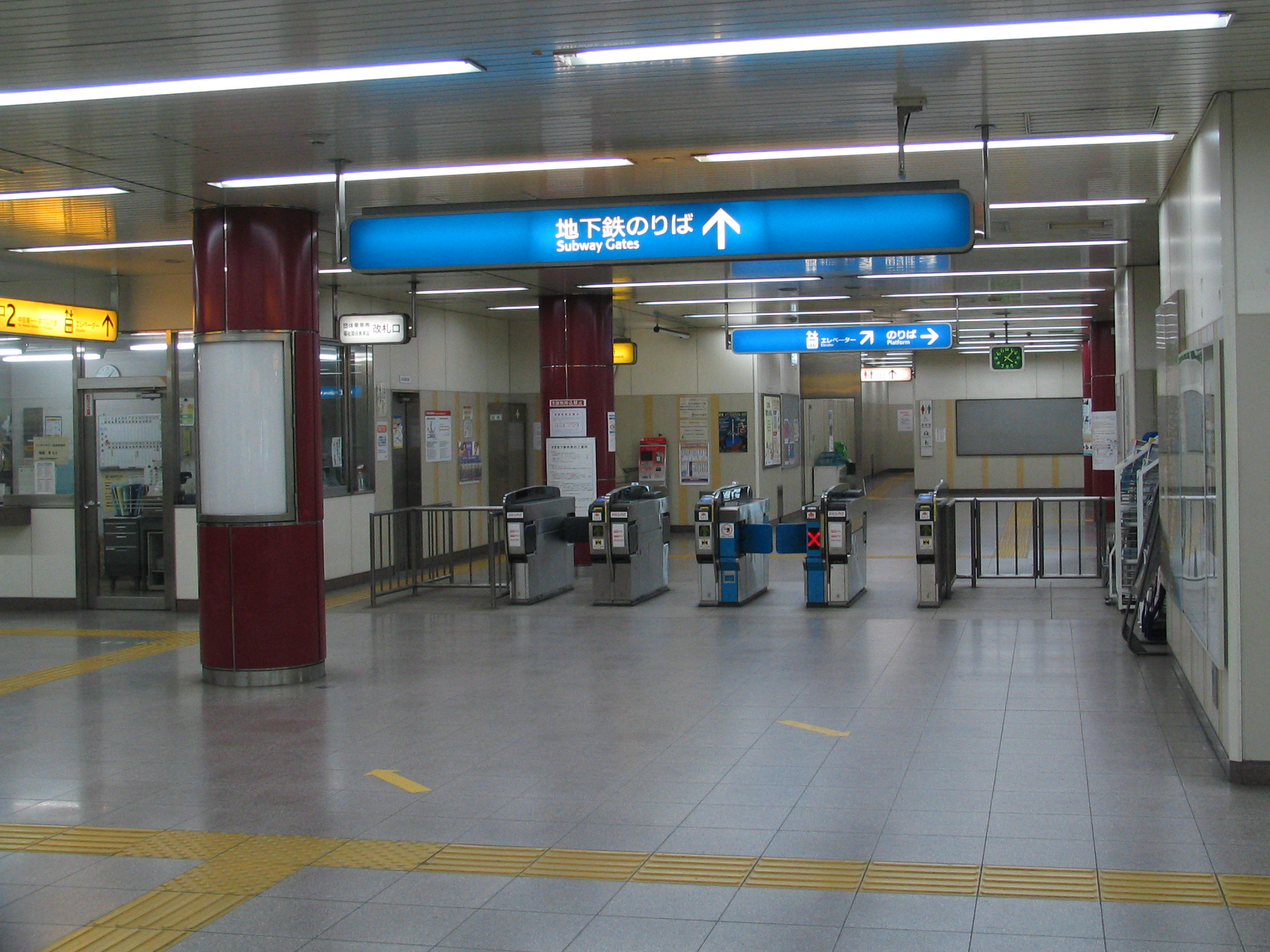
Ticket gates

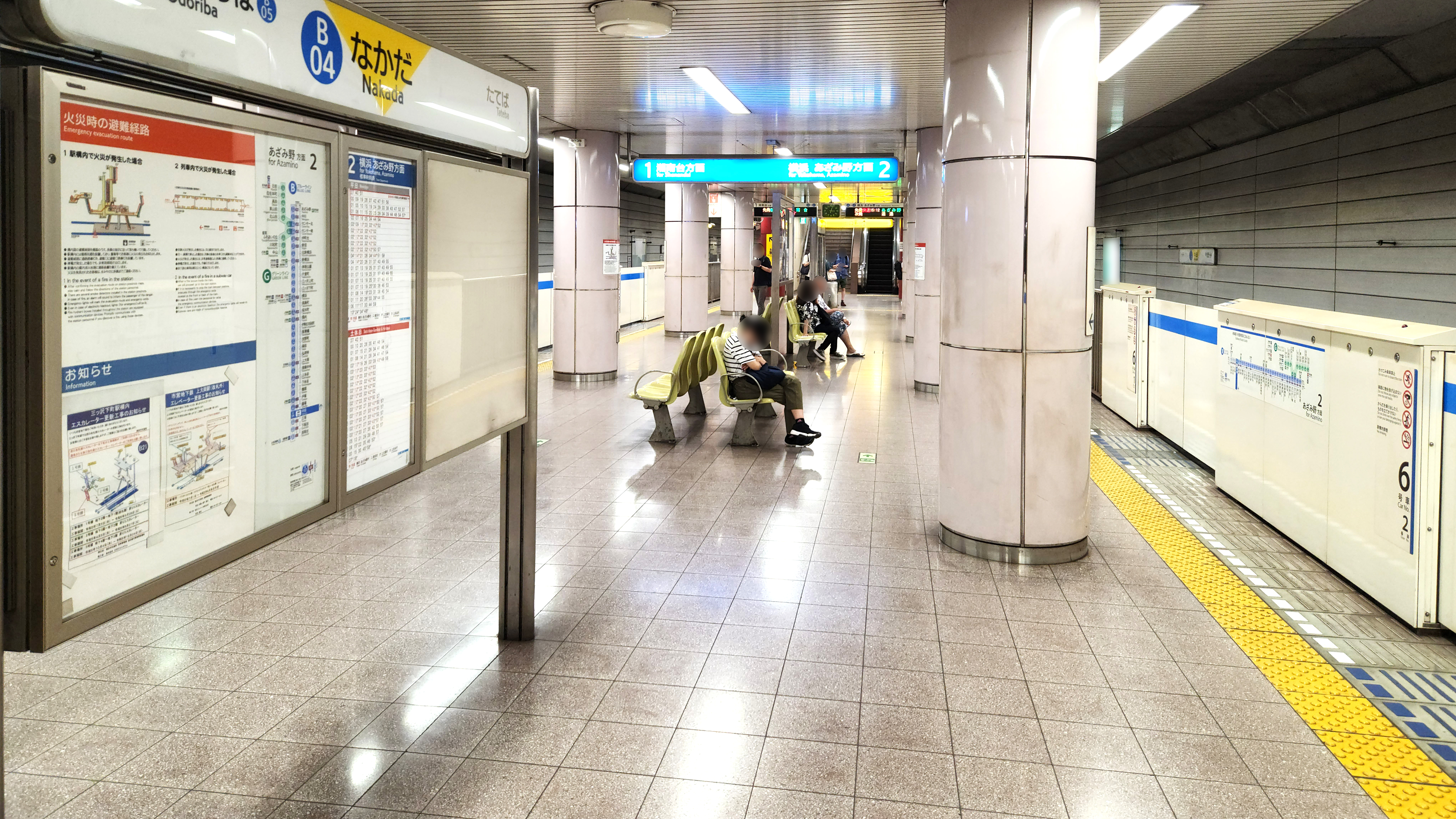
The platform in July 2023

== History ==
Nakada Station was opened on 29 August 1999. Platform screen doors were installed in September 2007.
