= Tateba Station =

Metro station in Yokohama, Japan

Coordinates: 35°24′51.47″N 139°30′0.89″E

B03 Tateba Station 立場駅
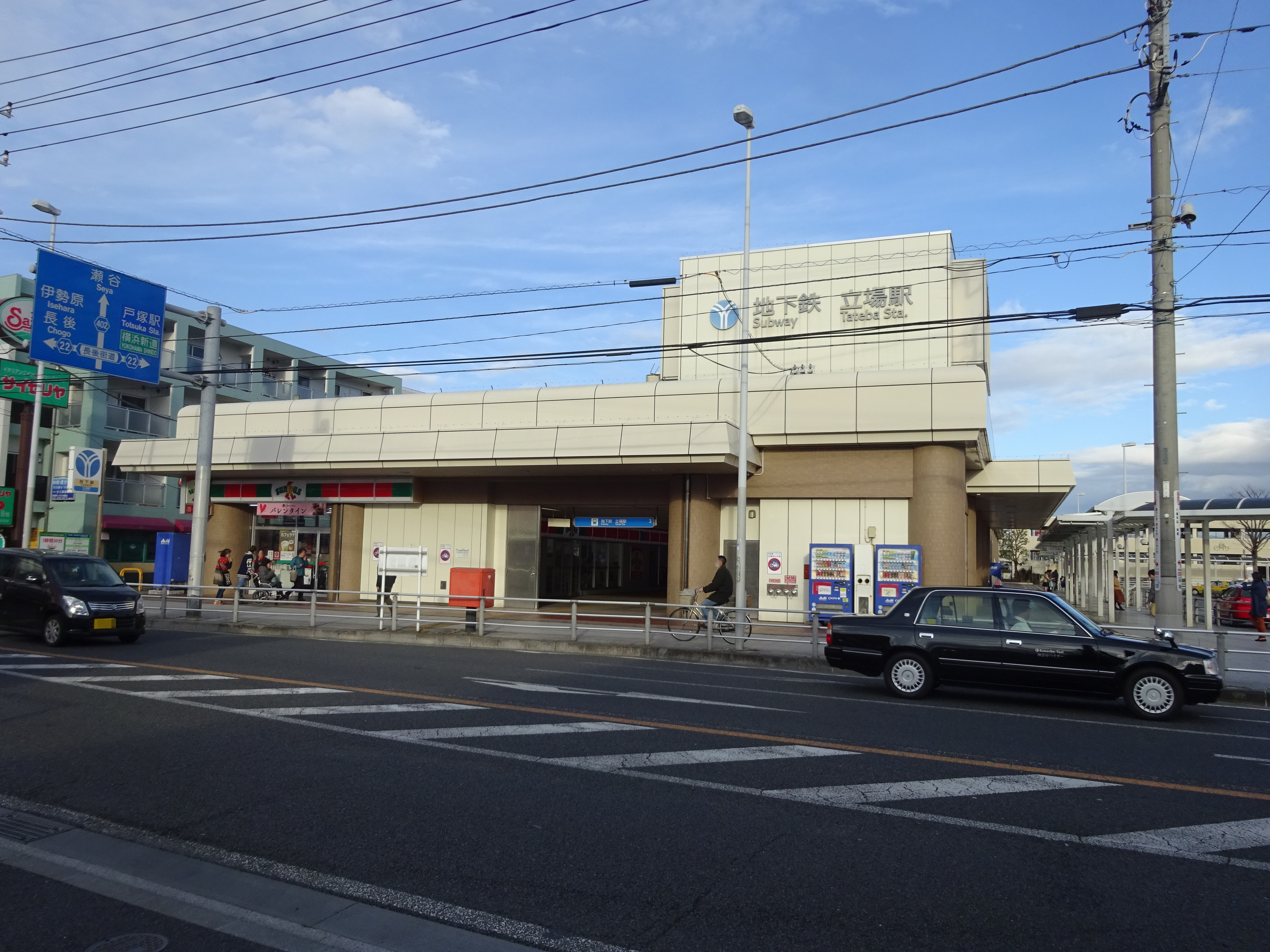
- Tateba Station building

General information
- Location: Nakada-Nishi 1-1-30, Izumi, Yokohama, Kanagawa （横浜市泉区下中田西一丁目1-30） Japan
- System: Yokohama Municipal Subway station
- Operator: Yokohama City Transportation Bureau
- Line: Blue Line
- Platforms: 1 island platform
- Tracks: 2

Other information
- Station code: B03

History
- Opened: 29 August 1999; 27 years ago

Passengers
- 2008: 10,015 daily

Services
Preceding station	Yokohama Municipal Subway	Following station
Shimoiida B02 towards Shonandai	Blue Line Rapid Local	Nakada B04 towards Azamino
Location
- Location within Yokohama Location within Kanagawa Prefecture Location within Japan

Tateba Station (立場駅, Tateba-eki) is an underground metro station located in Izumi-ku, Yokohama, Kanagawa, Japan operated by the Yokohama Municipal Subway’s Blue Line (Line 1). It is 3.7 kilometers from the terminus of the Blue Line at Shōnandai Station.

== Lines ==
- Yokohama Municipal Subway
  - Blue Line

== Station layout ==
Tateba Station has a single underground island platform serving two tracks, located two stories underneath a large above-ground station building.

=== Platforms ===
1	■ Blue Line (Yokohama)	Shōnandai
2	■ Blue Line (Yokohama)	Totsuka, Kamiōoka, Kannai, Yokohama, Azamino

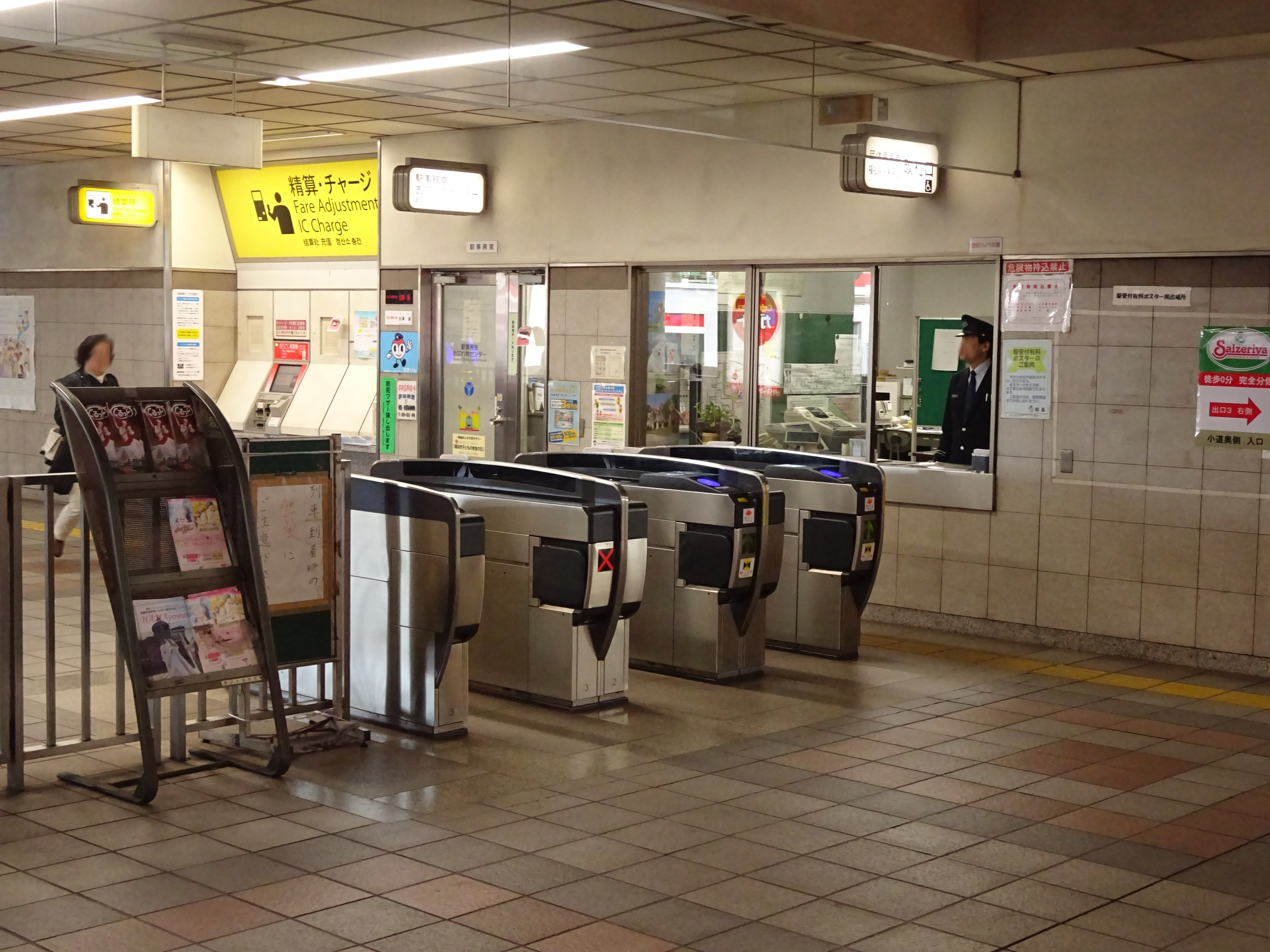
Ticket gates

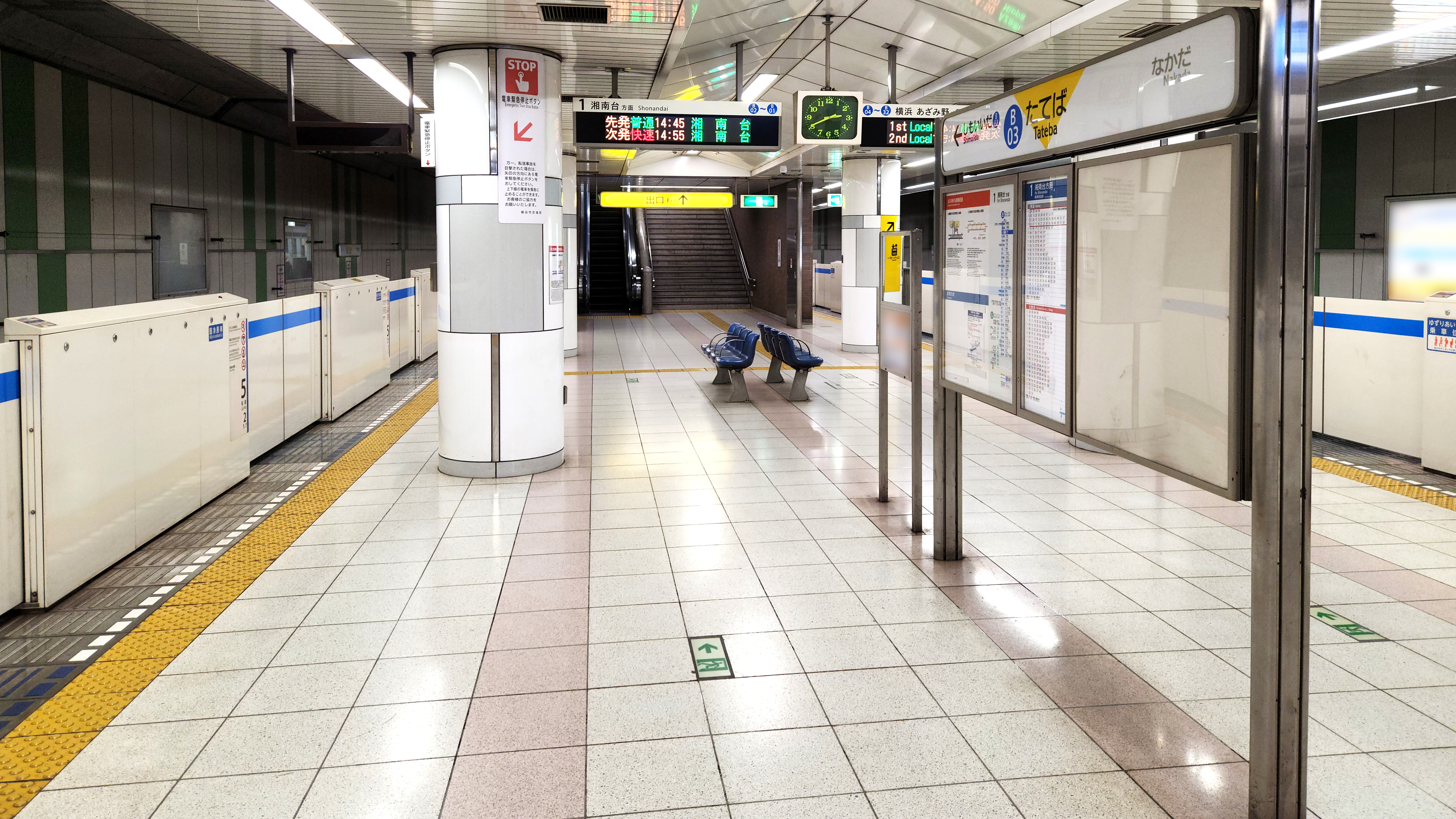
The platform in July 2023

== History ==
Tateba Station was opened on 29 August 1999. Platform screen doors were installed in September 2007.
