= Shimoiida Station =

Metro station in Yokohama, Japan

Coordinates: 35°24′12.56″N 139°28′59.46″E

B02 Shimoiida Station 下飯田駅
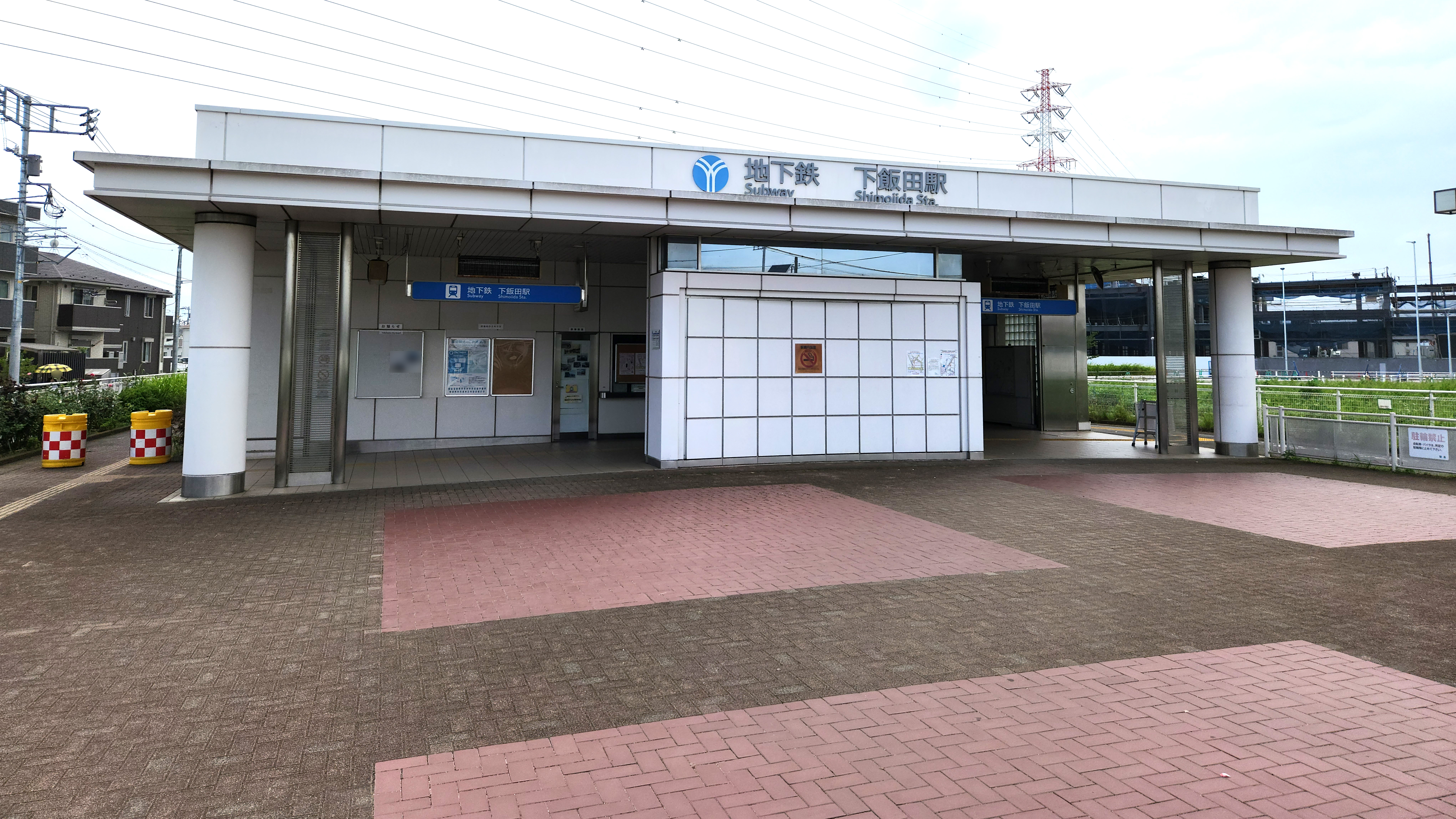
- The station building in July 2023

General information
- Location: Shimoiida 829-1, Izumi, Yokohama, Kanagawa （横浜市泉区下飯田町829-1） Japan
- System: Yokohama Municipal Subway station
- Operator: Yokohama City Transportation Bureau
- Line: Blue Line
- Platforms: 1 island platform
- Tracks: 2
- Connections: Sōtetsu Izumino Line (Yumegaoka Station)

Other information
- Station code: B02

History
- Opened: 29 August 1999; 27 years ago

Passengers
- 2008: 2,615 daily

Services
Preceding station	Yokohama Municipal Subway	Following station
Shōnandai B01 towards Shonandai	Blue Line Rapid Local	Tateba B03 towards Azamino
Location
- Location within Yokohama Location within Kanagawa Prefecture Location within Japan

Shimoiida Station (下飯田駅, Shimoiida-eki) is an underground metro station located in Izumi-ku, Yokohama, Kanagawa, Japan operated by the Yokohama Municipal Subway’s Blue Line (Line 1). It is 1.6 kilometers from the terminus of the Blue Line at Shōnandai Station.

== Lines ==
- Yokohama Municipal Subway
  - Blue Line (Line 1)

== Station layout ==
Shimoiida Station has a single underground island platform serving two tracks.

=== Platforms ===
1	■ Blue Line (Yokohama)	Shōnandai
2	■ Blue Line (Yokohama)	Totsuka, Kamiōoka, Kannai, Yokohama, Azamino

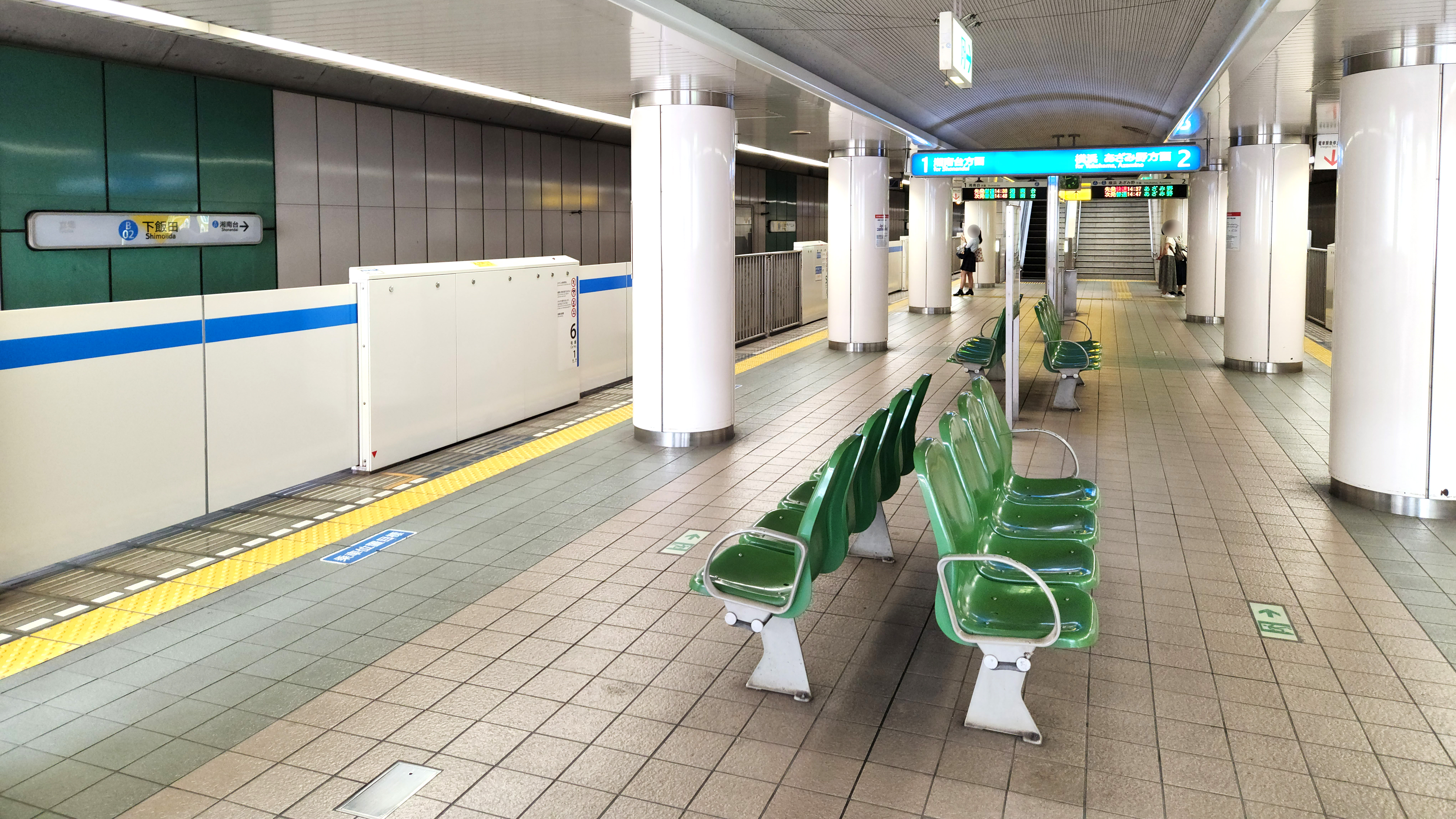
The platform in July 2023

== History ==
Shimoiida Station was opened on 29 August 1999. Since 20 January 2007, an ATO system has been in operation at the station. Platform screen doors were installed in September 2007.
