= Odoriba Station =

Metro station in Yokohama, Japan

Coordinates: 35°24′20″N 139°31′7″E

B05 Odoriba Station 踊場駅
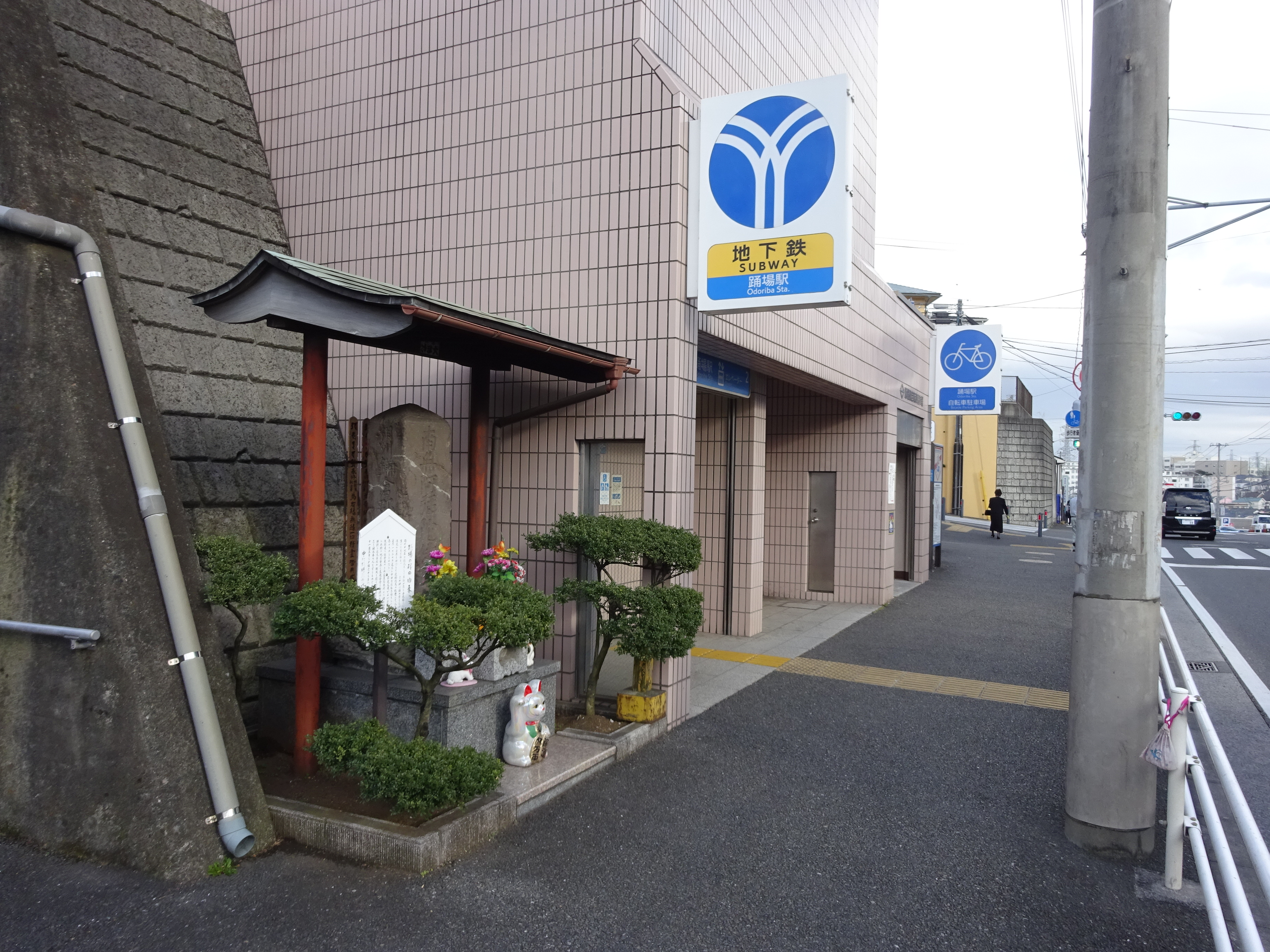
- Entrance No. 2

General information
- Location: Nakada-Minami 1-2-1, Izumi, Yokohama, Kanagawa （横浜市泉区下中田南一丁目2-1） Japan
- System: Yokohama Municipal Subway station
- Operator: Yokohama City Transportation Bureau
- Line: Blue Line
- Platforms: 1 island platform
- Tracks: 2

Other information
- Station code: B05

History
- Opened: 29 August 1999; 27 years ago

Passengers
- 2008: 8,908 daily

Services
Preceding station	Yokohama Municipal Subway	Following station
Nakada B04 towards Shonandai	Blue Line Rapid Local	Totsuka B06 towards Azamino
Location
- Location within Yokohama Location within Kanagawa Prefecture Location within Japan

Odoriba Station (踊場駅, Odoriba-eki) is an underground metro station located in Izumi-ku, Yokohama, Kanagawa, Japan operated by the Yokohama Municipal Subway’s Blue Line (Line 1). It is 5.7 kilometers from the terminus of the Blue Line at Shōnandai Station. "Odoriba"(It means "Dance place" in Japanese) is an unofficial place name, it is named after folklore in Totsuka-juku "Cats' dance place".

== Lines ==
- Yokohama Municipal Subway
  - Blue Line

== Station layout ==
Odoriba Station has a single underground island platform serving two tracks.

=== Platforms ===
1	■ Blue Line (Yokohama)	Shōnandai
2	■ Blue Line (Yokohama)	Totsuka, Kamiōoka, Kannai, Yokohama, Azamino

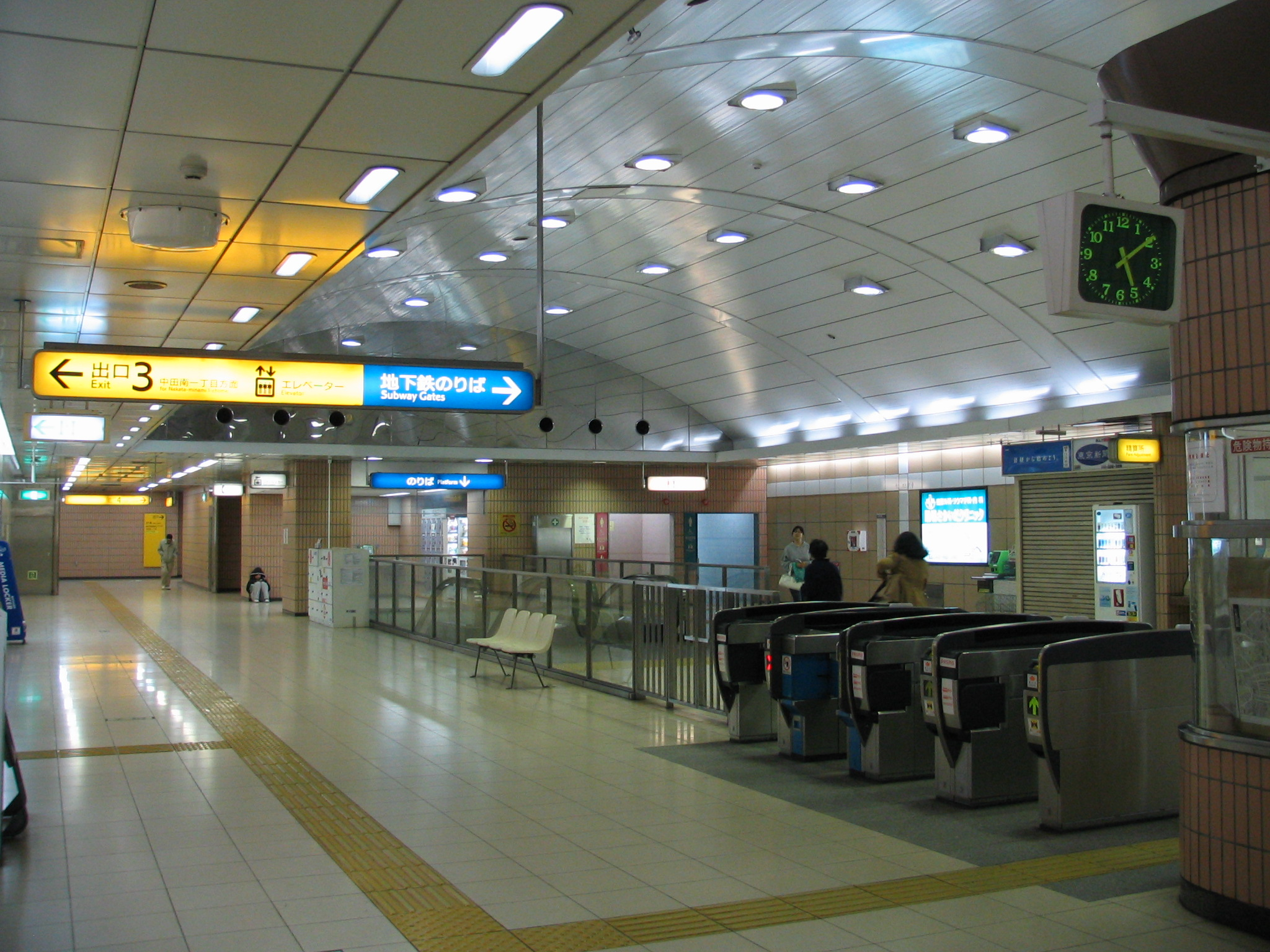
Ticket gates

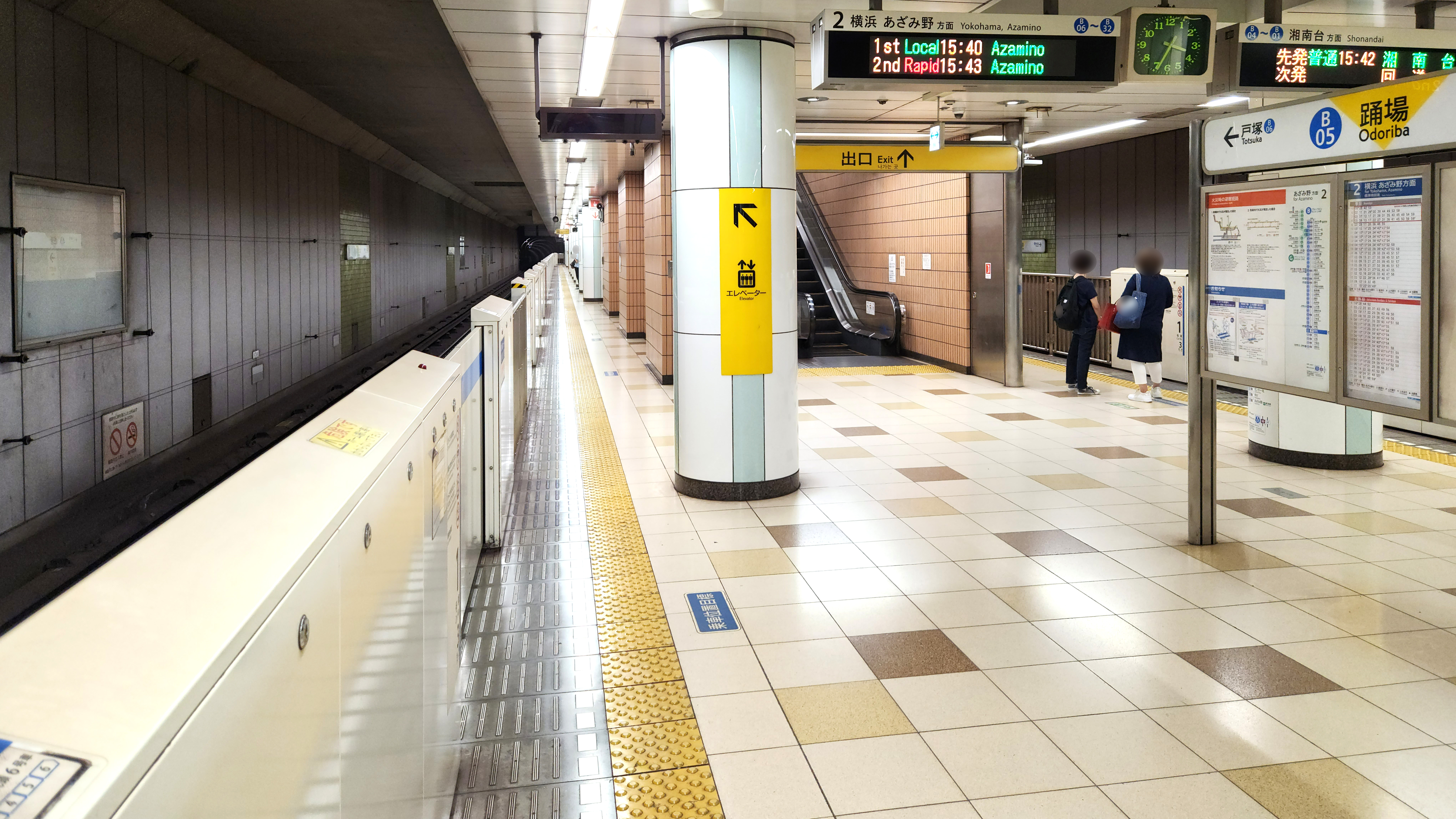
The platform in July 2023

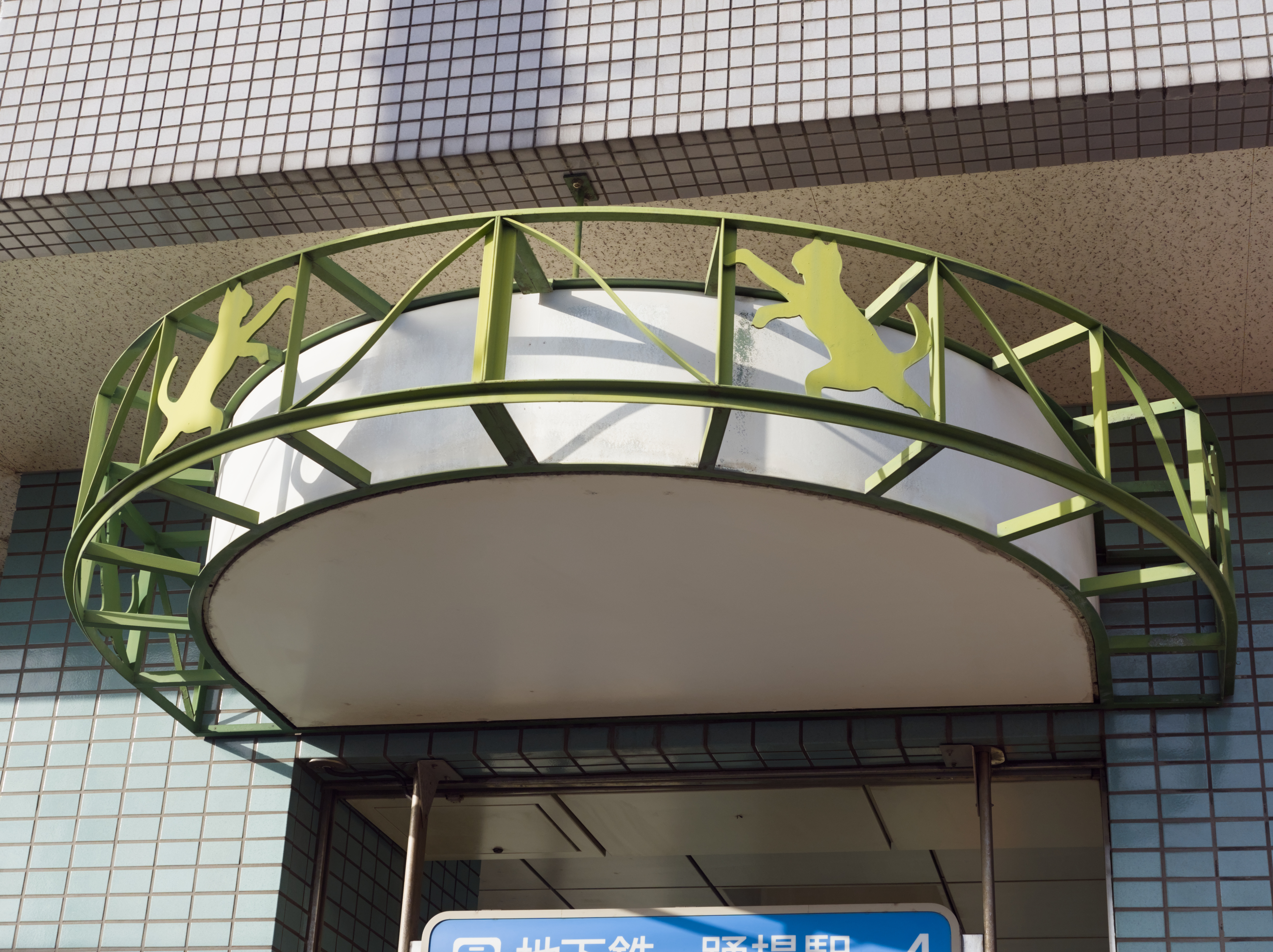
Entrance No. 4

== History ==
Odoriba Station was opened on 29 August 1999. Since 20 January 2007, an ATO system has been in operation at the station. Platform screen doors were installed in September 2007.
