= Azamino =

Coordinates: 35.568764°N 139.553518°E

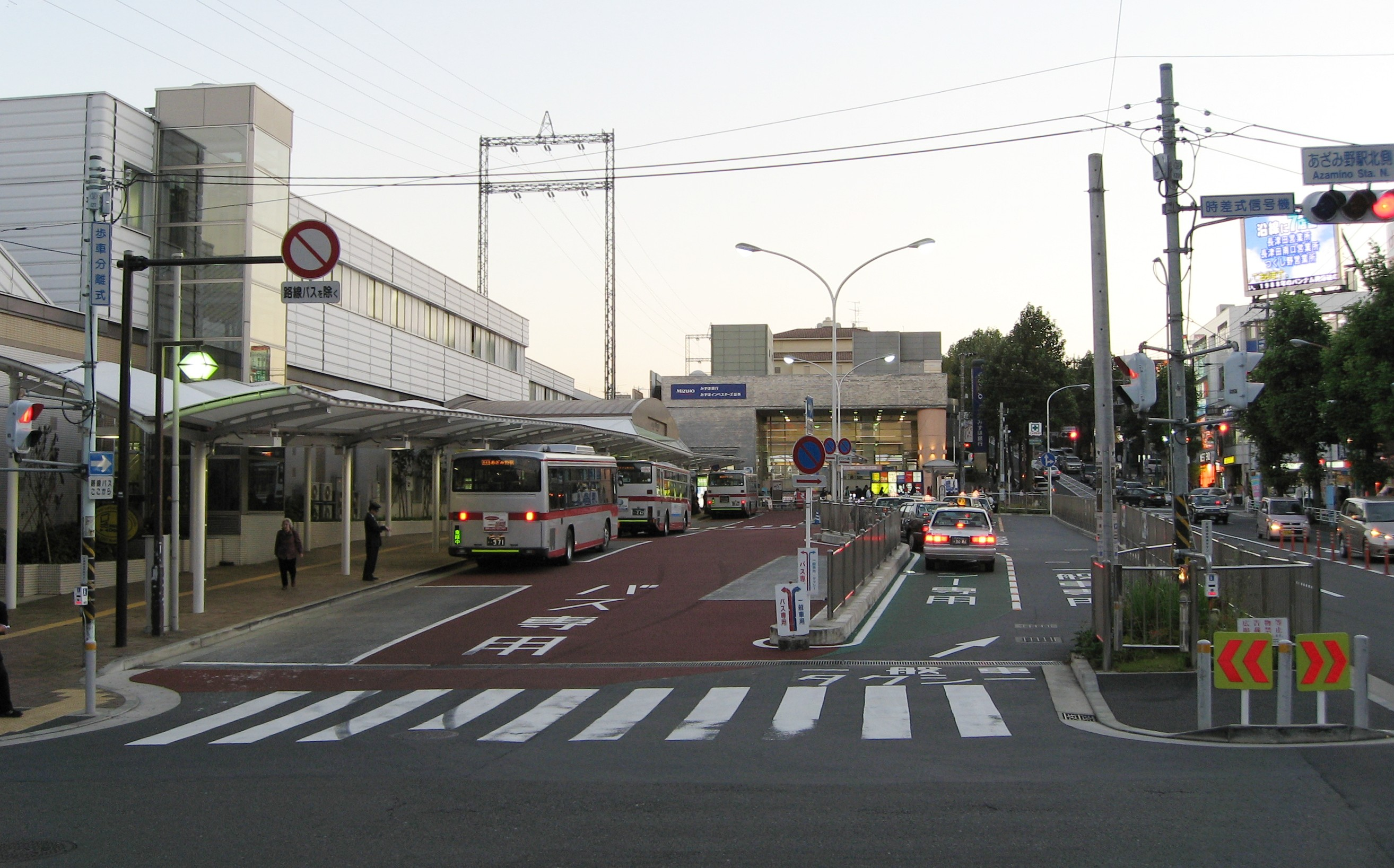
View of Field of West Exit of Azamino Station

Azamino (あざみ野) is a bedroom community of Tokyo and Yokohama, located in Aoba-ku, Yokohama, Kanagawa Prefecture, Japan. The area is 20 minutes from Shibuya Station on the Tōkyū Den-en-toshi Line and 27 minutes by subway from Yokohama Station on the Yokohama Subway. Known as an upscale enclave, its residents have come to endearingly refer to themselves as Azaminese. It has seen development in recent years. It is located next to the trendy Tama Plaza.

In 1983, Shiki Arts Center, the home base of Shiki Theatre Company, was built in Azamino, to commemorate the 30th anniversary of the company's founding.

== See also ==
- Azamino Station
