= Gumyōji Station (Yokohama Municipal Subway) =

Metro station in Yokohama, Japan

Coordinates: 35°25′23″N 139°36′7.5″E

B12 Gumyōji Station 弘明寺駅
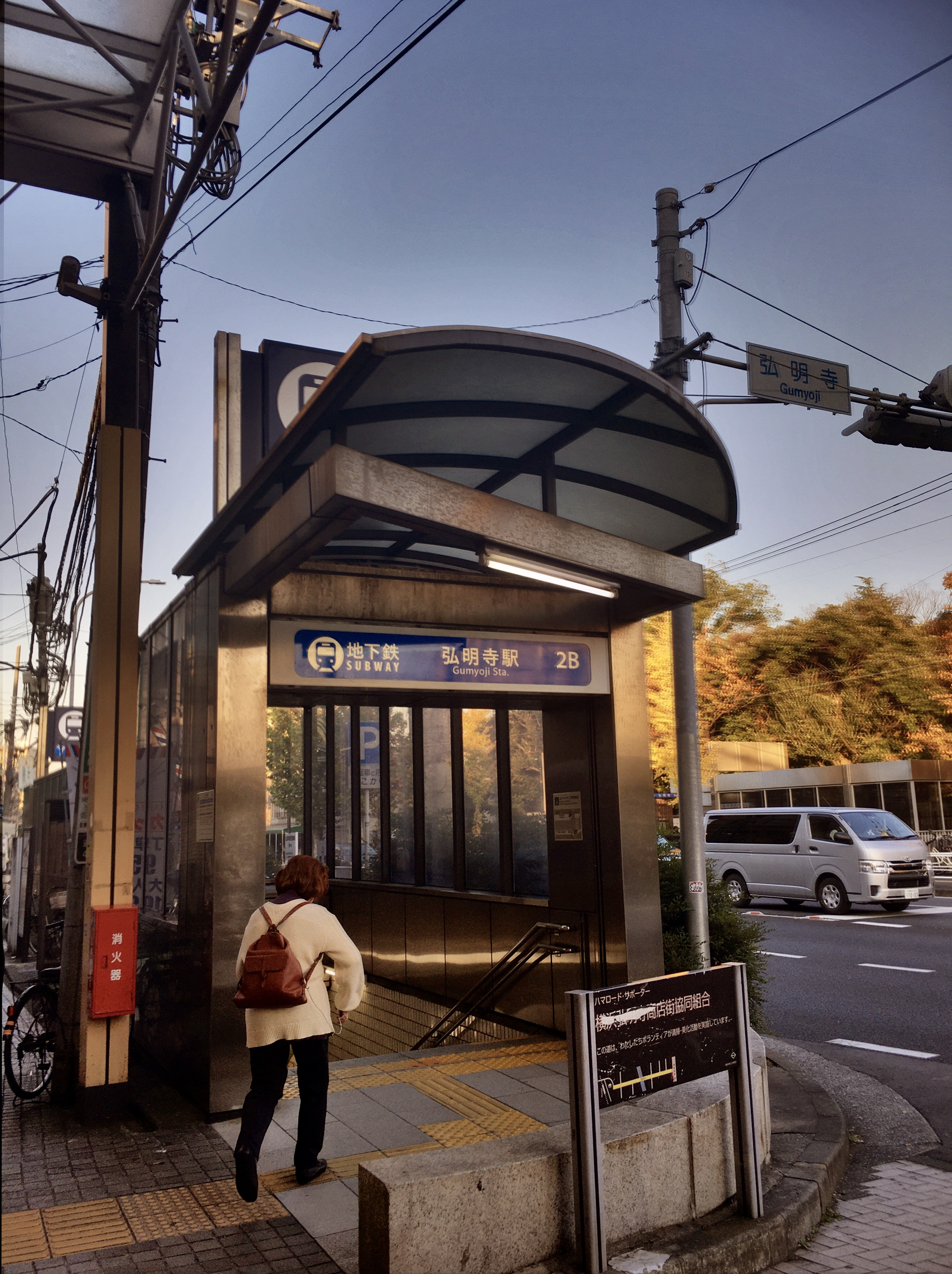
- Entrance 2B in November 2020

General information
- Location: Tōrichō 4-114, Minami, Yokohama, Kanagawa （横浜市南区通町四丁目114） Japan
- System: Yokohama Municipal Subway station
- Operator: Yokohama City Transportation Bureau
- Line: Blue Line
- Distance: 15.4 km (9.6 mi) from Shōnandai
- Platforms: 2 side platforms
- Tracks: 2

Other information
- Station code: B12

History
- Opened: December 16, 1972; 53 years ago

Passengers
- 2008: 8,558 daily

Services
Preceding station	Yokohama Municipal Subway	Following station
Kamiōoka B11 towards Shonandai	Blue Line Local	Maita B13 towards Azamino
Location
- Location within Yokohama Location within Kanagawa Prefecture Location within Japan

Gumyōji Station (弘明寺駅, Gumyōji-eki) is an underground metro station located in Minami-ku, Yokohama, Kanagawa, Japan operated by the Yokohama Municipal Subway’s Blue Line (Line 1). Note that Gumyōji Station of the Keikyū Main Line is located about 500 m away, on the other side of the Gumyōji Kannon Shopping Street (弘明寺かんのん通り商店街).

== Lines ==
- Yokohama Municipal Subway
  - Blue Line

== Station layout ==
Gumyōji Station is an underground station with two opposed side platforms serving two tracks.

=== Platforms ===
1	■ Blue Line (Yokohama)	Kamiōoka, Totsuka, Shōnandai
2	■ Blue Line (Yokohama)	Kannai, Yokohama, Shin-Yokohama, Azamino

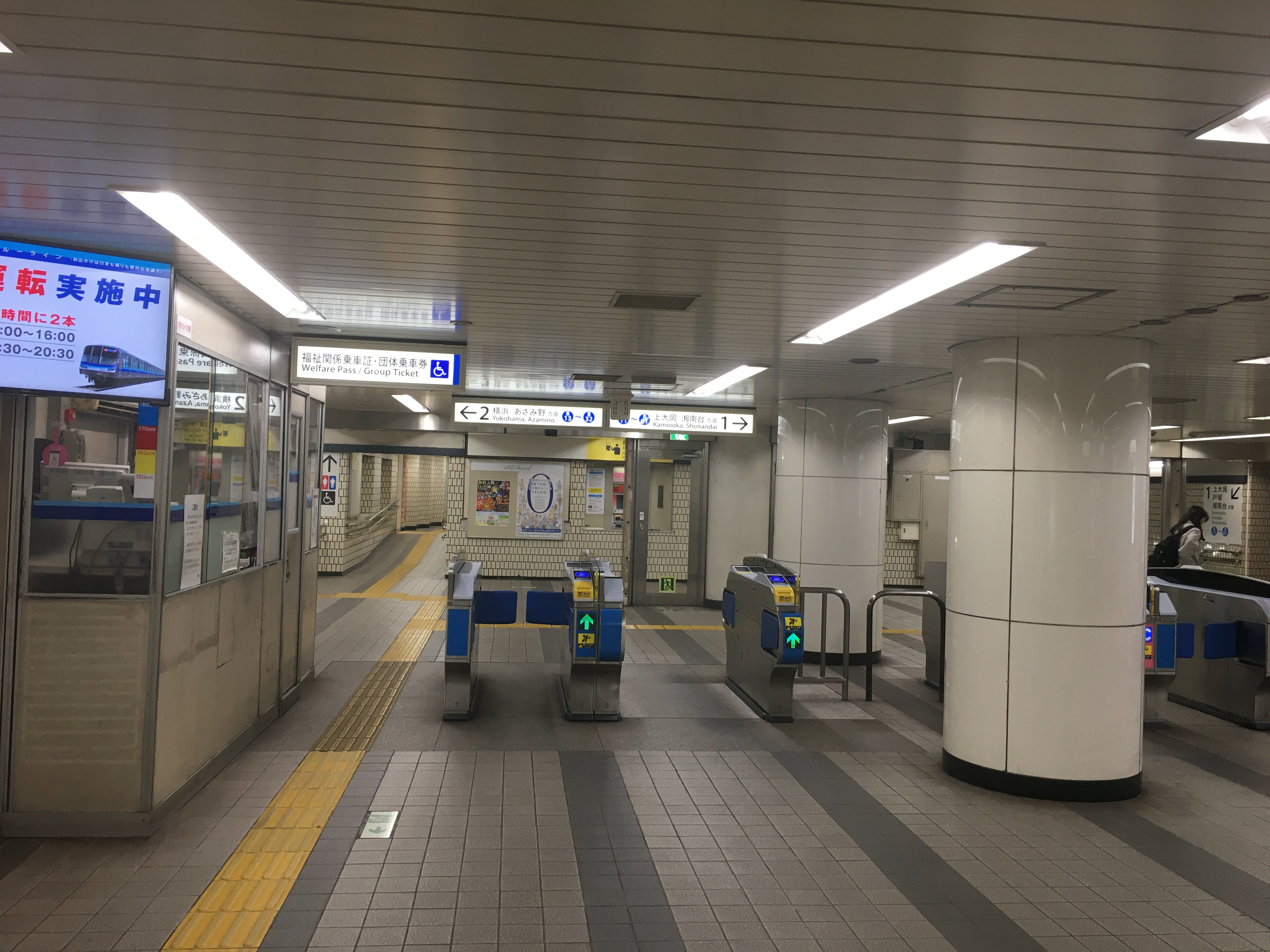
Ticket gates

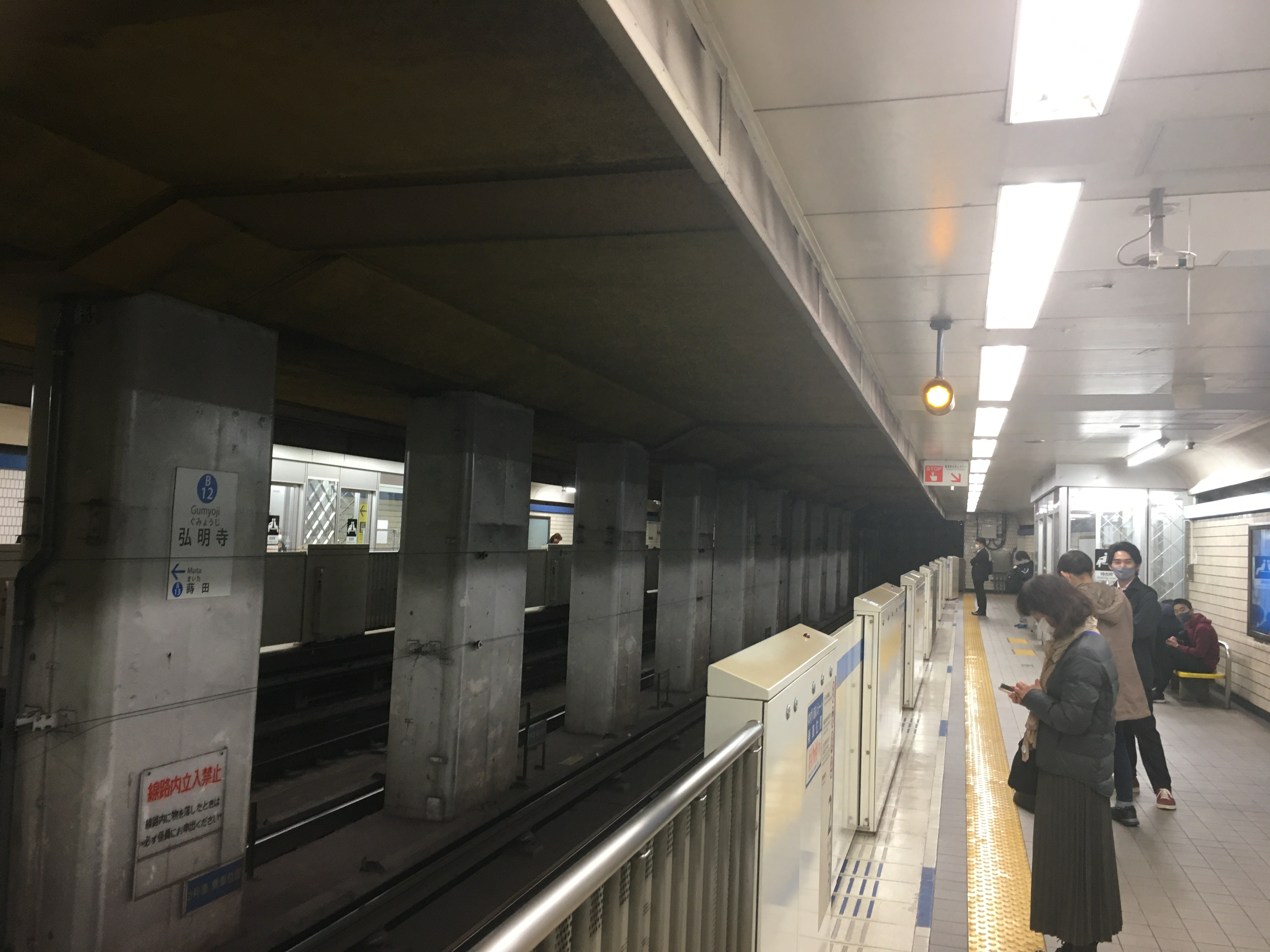
Platform

== History ==
Gumyōji Station was opened on 16 December 1972. Platform screen doors were installed in September 2007.
