= Gumyōji Station =

Gumyōji Station could refer to one of two train stations in Japan:

- Gumyōji Station (Yokohama Subway)
- Gumyōji Station (Keikyū)
