= Izumi-ku =

The word "Izumi-ku" may refer to:

- Izumi-ku, Yokohama is one of the wards of Yokohama City, Japan
- Izumi-ku, Sendai is one of the wards of Sendai City, Japan
