= Tama-plaza Station =

Railway station in Yokohama, Japan

Tama-plaza たまプラーザ

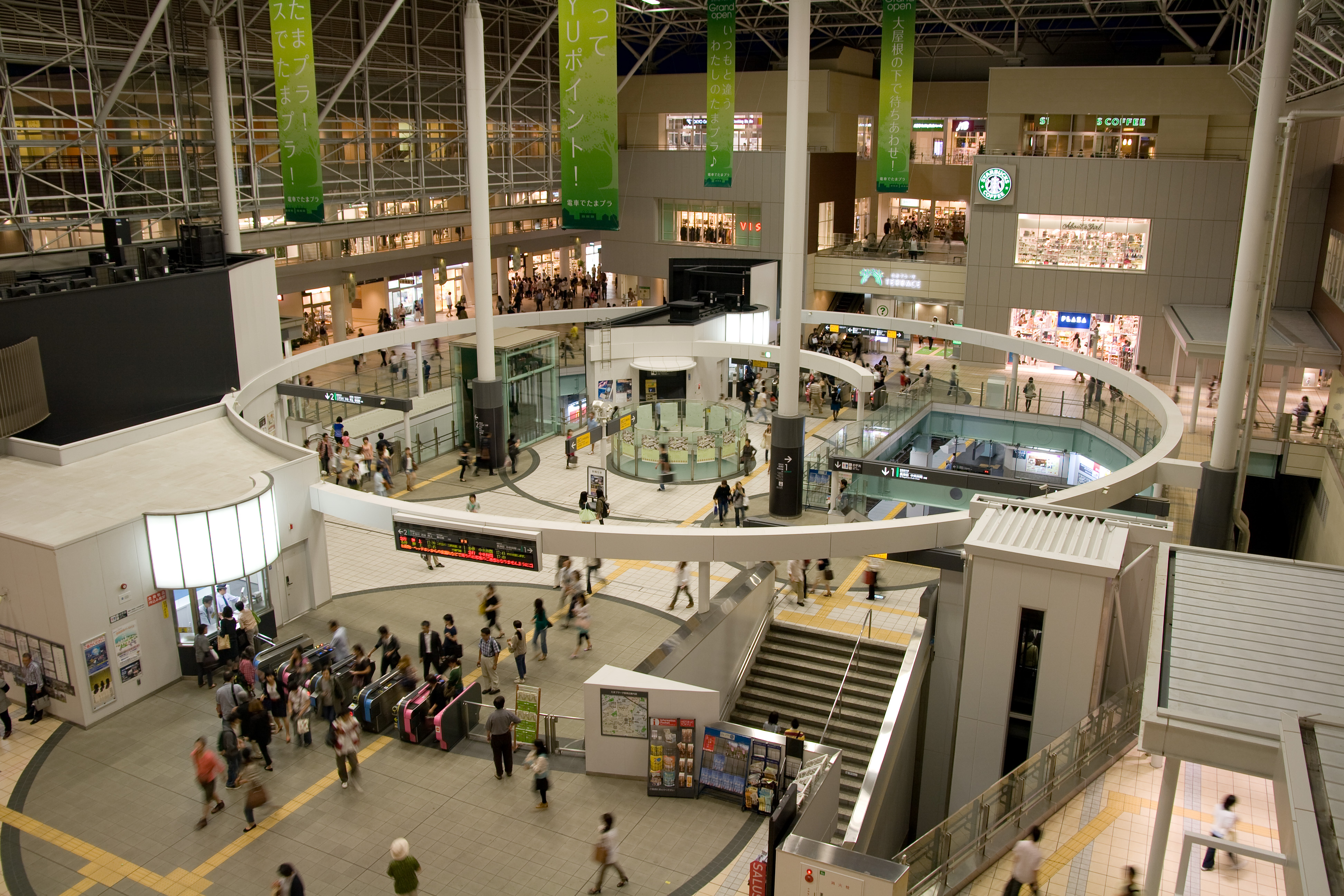
- Tama-plaza station

General information
- Location: 1-3 Utsukushigaoka, Aoba-ku, Yokohama-shi, Kanagawa-ken 225-0002; Japan
- Coordinates: 35°34′39″N 139°33′30″E
- Operator: Tōkyū Railways
- Line: Den-en-toshi Line
- Distance: 17.1 km (10.6 mi) from Shibuya
- Platforms: 2 side platforms
- Tracks: 2
- Connections: Bus terminal

Construction
- Structure type: Underground

Other information
- Station code: DT15
- Website: Official website

History
- Opened: 1 April 1966; 60 years ago

Passengers
- FY2019: 59,624

Services
Preceding station	Tōkyū Railways	Following station
Azamino towards Chūō-rinkan	Den-en-toshi Line Express Semi-Express Local	Saginuma towards Shibuya
Location
- Location within Tokyo Bay and Bōsō Peninsula Location within Kanagawa Prefecture Location within Japan

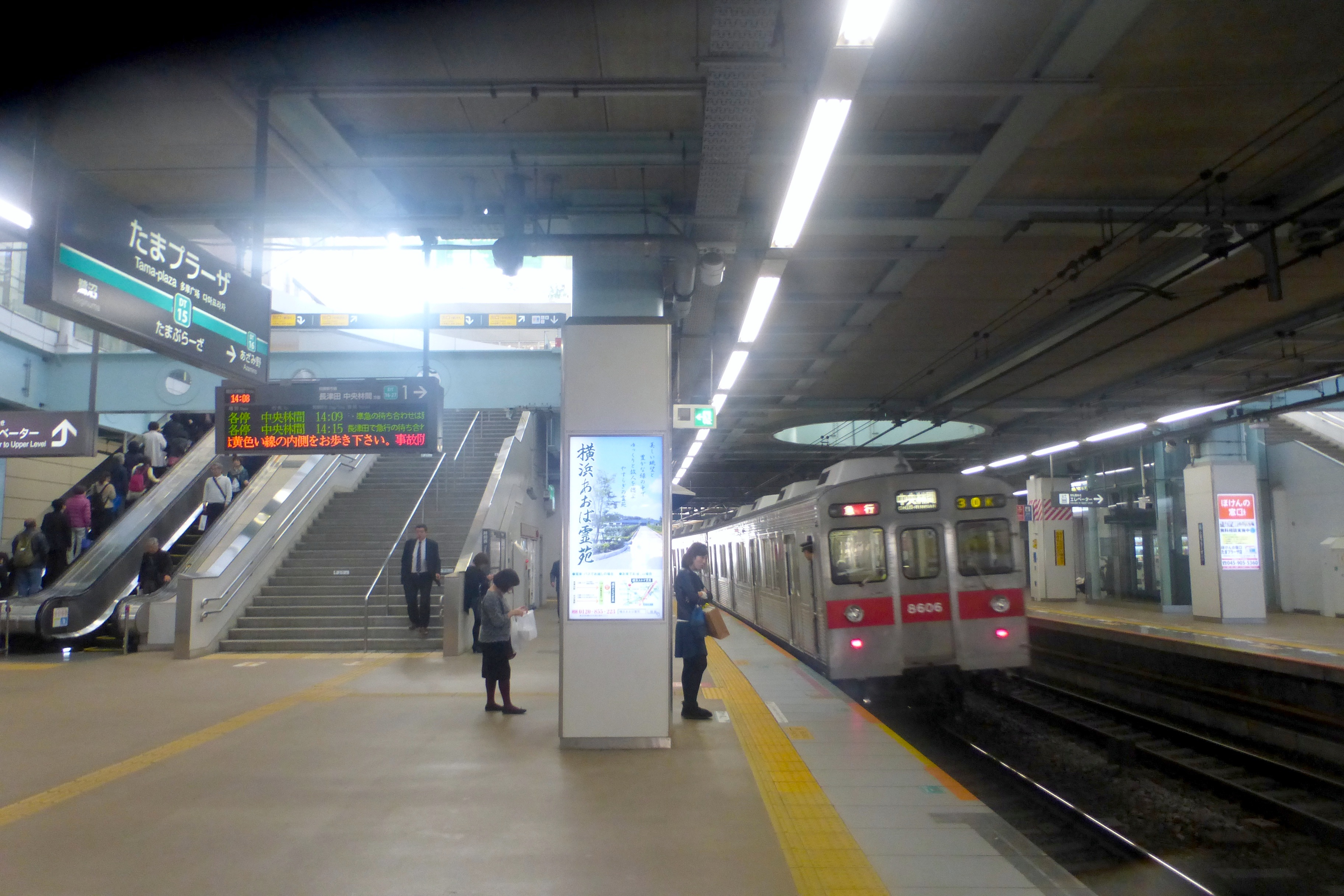
Platforms with a train, 2015

Tama-plaza Station (たまプラーザ駅, Tama-purāza-eki) is a passenger railway station located in Aoba-ku, Yokohama, Kanagawa Prefecture, Japan, operated by the private railway company Tokyu Corporation.

== Lines ==
Tama-plaza Station is served by the Tōkyū Den-en-toshi Line from Shibuya in Tokyo to Chūō-rinkan in Kanagawa Prefecture. It is 17.1 kilometers from the terminus of the line at Shibuya.

== Station layout ==
The station consists of two opposed side platforms serving two tracks.

=== Platforms ===
1	■ Tōkyū Den-en-toshi Line	Nagatsuta・Chūō-rinkan
2	■ Tōkyū Den-en-toshi Line	Futako-tamagawa・Shibuya・Oshiage (Tokyo Metro Hanzōmon Line)・Tōbu-Dōbutsu-Kōen (Tobu Skytree Line)

== History ==
Tama-plaza Station was opened on April 1, 1966. The station building was extensively remodeled in 2006 by the American firm Laguarda.Low Architects.

== Passenger statistics ==
In fiscal 2019, the station was used by an average of 59,624 passengers daily.

The passenger figures for previous years are as shown below.

Fiscal year	daily average
2005	64,238
2010	71,255
2015	81,065

== Surrounding area ==
- Tokyu Department Store Tama Plaza
- Kokugakuin University Tamaplaza Campus
- Kanagawa Prefectural Motoishikawa High School

== See also ==
- List of railway stations in Japan
