= Totsuka Station =

Railway and metro station in Yokohama, Japan

TTKJT06 JO10 JS10 B06 Totsuka Station 戸塚駅
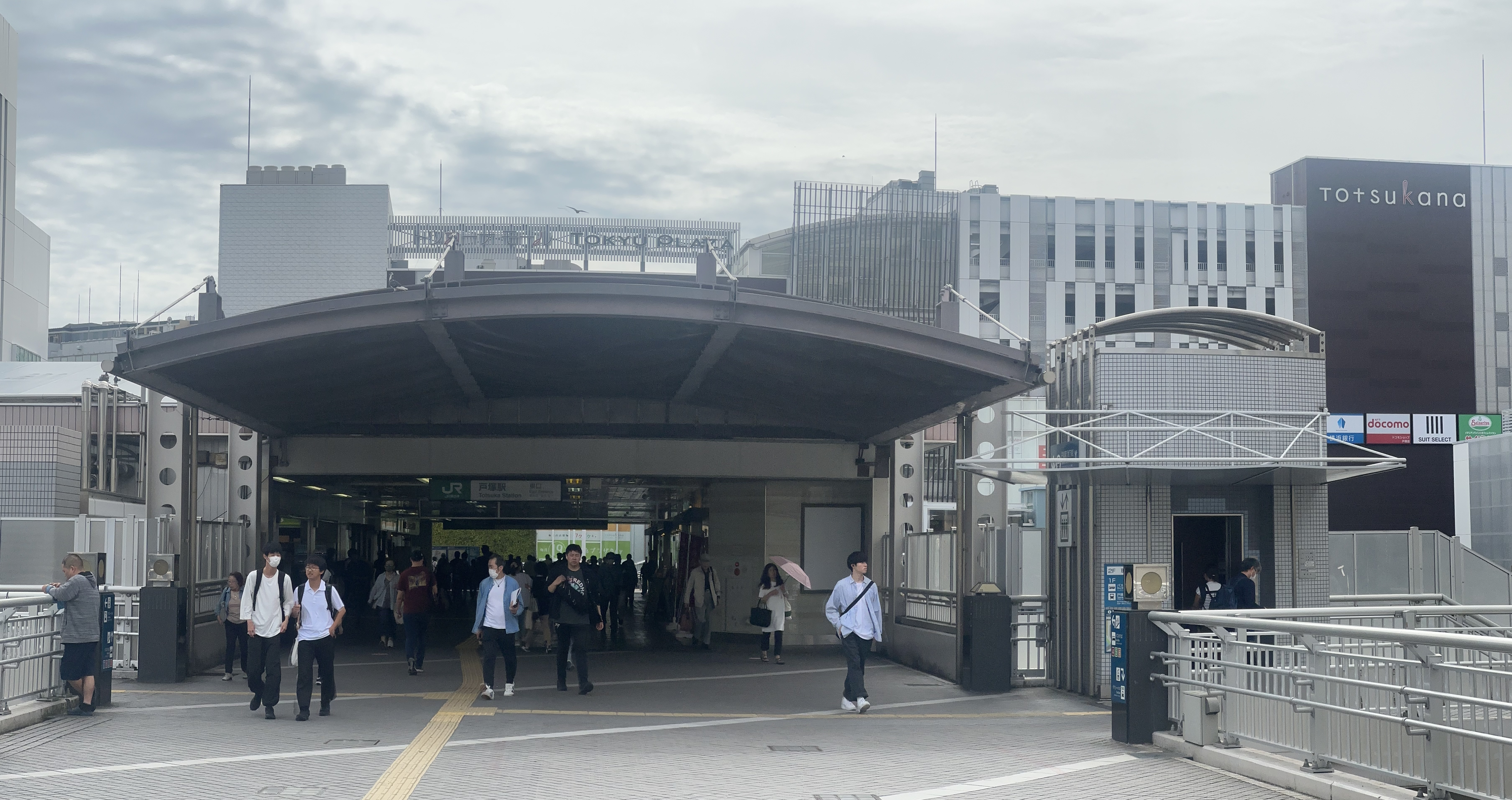
- East entrance, 2024

General information
- Location: Totsuka-chō, Totsuka-ku, Yokohama-shi, Kanagawa-ken 244-0003; Japan
- Coordinates: 35°24′2″N 139°32′3″E
- System: JR East station Yokohama Municipal Subway station
- Operator: JR East; Yokohama City Transportation Bureau
- Lines: Tōkaidō Main Line; Yokosuka Line; Shōnan-Shinjuku Line; Blue Line
- Distance: 40.9 km (25.4 mi) from Tokyo
- Platforms: 3 island platforms
- Connections: Bus terminal

Other information
- Status: Staffed (Midori no Madoguchi )
- Station code: JT06, JO10, JS10, B06
- Website: Official website

History
- Opened: 11 July 1887; 139 years ago

Passengers
- FY2019: 112,598 daily (JR East); 44,137 (daily, Blue Line)

Services
Preceding station	JR East	Following station
Ōfuna towards Atami	Tōkaidō Line	Yokohama towards Tokyo
Ōfuna Terminus	Narita Express	Yokohama towards Narita Airport Terminal 1
Ōfuna towards Kurihama	Yokosuka Line	Higashi-Totsuka JO11 towards Tokyo
Ōfuna towards Odawara or Zushi	Shōnan–Shinjuku Line Special Rapid Rapid	Yokohama towards Takasaki or Maebashi
Ōfuna towards Odawara or Zushi	Shōnan–Shinjuku Line Rapid Local	Higashi-Totsuka JS11 towards Utsunomiya
Preceding station	Yokohama Municipal Subway	Following station
Odoriba B05 towards Shonandai	Blue Line Rapid	Kaminagaya B09 towards Azamino
Odoriba B05 towards Shonandai	Blue Line Local	Maioka B07 towards Azamino
Location
- Location within Yokohama Location within Kanagawa Prefecture Location within Japan

The Totsuka Station (Japanese: 戸塚駅, Japanese pronunciation: [Totsuka-eki]) is an interchange passenger railway station located in Totsuka-ku, Yokohama, Japan, operated by the East Japan Railway Company (JR East) and the Yokohama City Transportation Bureau.

== Lines ==
JR Totsuka Station is served by the Tōkaidō Main Line, Yokosuka Line and Shōnan-Shinjuku Line and is 40.9 kilometers from Tokyo. The underground Blue Line station is 7.4 kilometers from the terminus of the subway line at Shōnandai.

== Station layout ==
JR Totsuka Station is a ground level station with two island platforms serving four tracks, with an additional set of freight tracks on the west side. The platforms are connected to the station's two gates upstairs (over the tracks) and downstairs (underground). The station has a Midori no Madoguchi staffed ticket office. The Yokohama Subway station, connected with the JR underground concourse, has one underground island platform.

=== JR East platforms ===
1	Yokosuka Line	for Yokohama, Musashi-Kosugi, Shinagawa and Tokyo; Sōbu Line (Rapid) for Chiba, Narita Line for Narita Airport, Uchibō Line for Kimitsu, Sotobō Line for Kazusa-Ichinomiya
1	■ Narita Express	for Yokohama, Tokyo, Narita Airport
1	Shōnan-Shinjuku Line	for Yokohama, Musashi-Kosugi, Shinjuku, Ōmiya; Utsunomiya Line for Oyama, and Utsunomiya; Takasaki Line for Kagohara, Takasaki and Maebashi
2	Tōkaidō Line (Ueno-Tokyo Line)	for Yokohama, Tokyo, Ueno, Ōmiya; Utsunomiya Line for Utsunomiya and Kuroiso; Takasaki Line for Takasaki and Maebashi
3	Tōkaidō Line	for Ōfuna, Hiratsuka, Odawara, Atami and Numazu; Itō Line for Itō
4	Yokosuka Line	for Ōfuna, Zushi, Kamakura, Yokosuka, and Kurihama
4	Shōnan-Shinjuku Line	for Ōfuna; Yokosuka Line for Zushi; Tōkaidō Line for Hiratsuka and Odawara

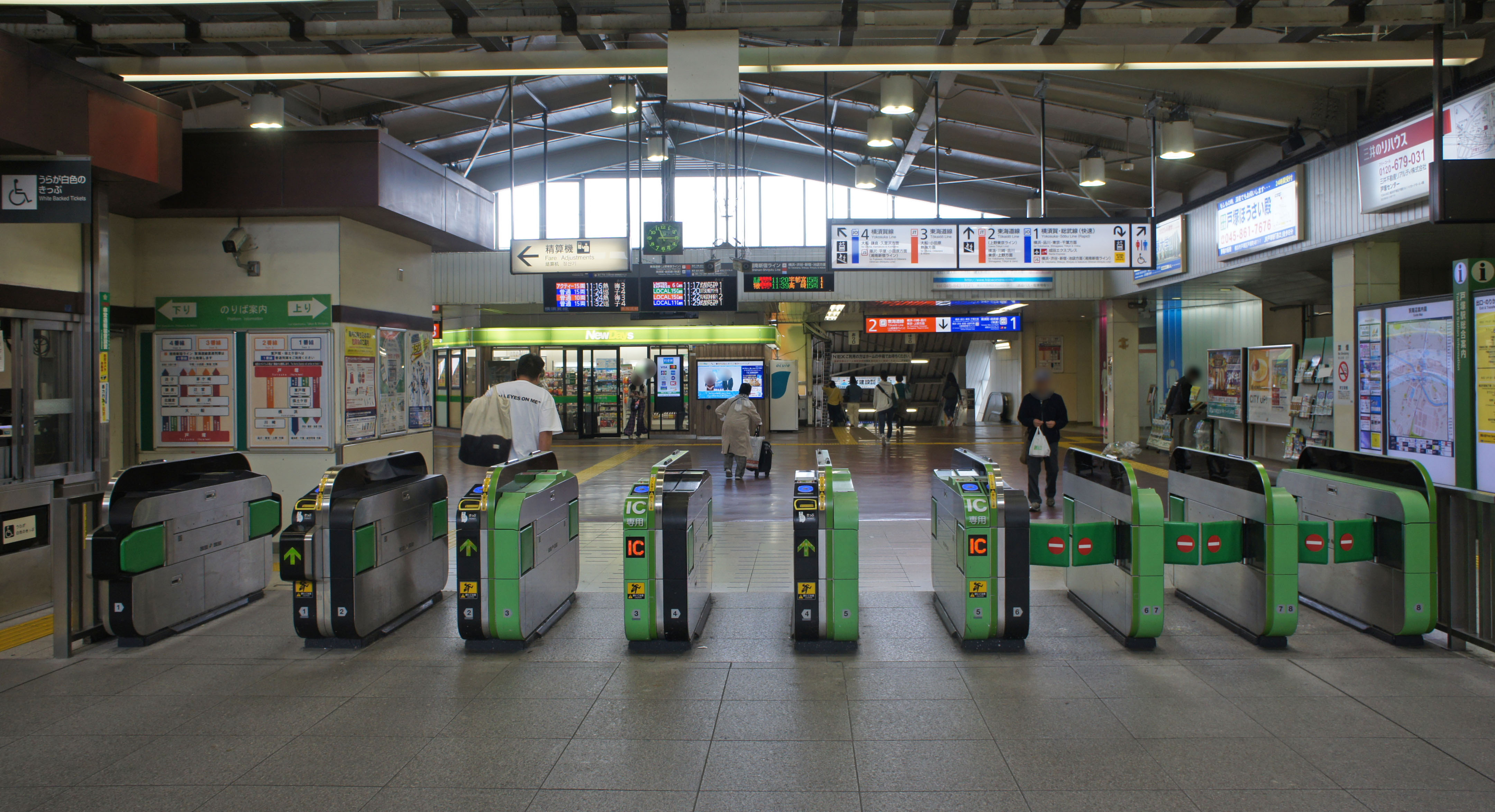
Ticket gates

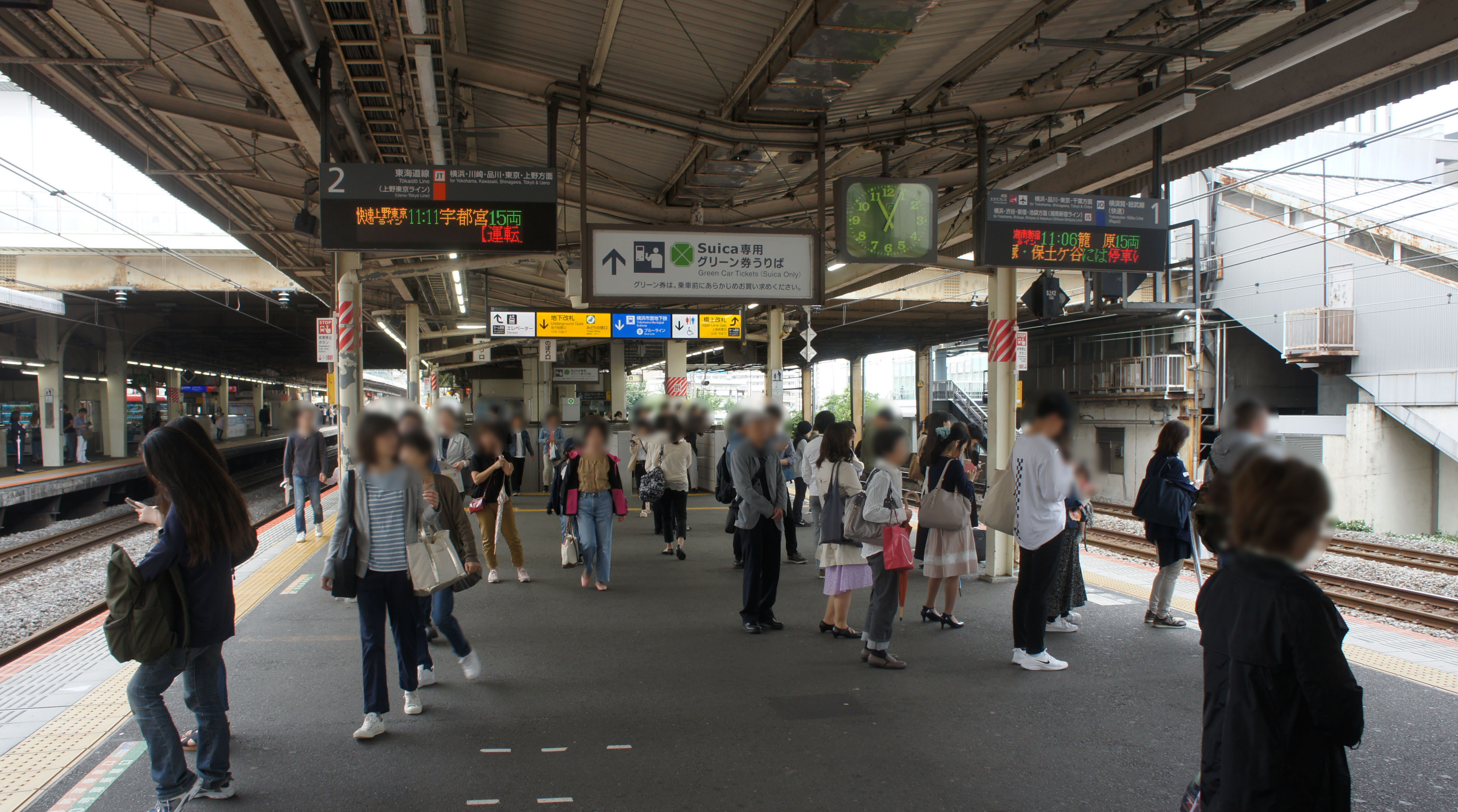
Platforms 1 and 2

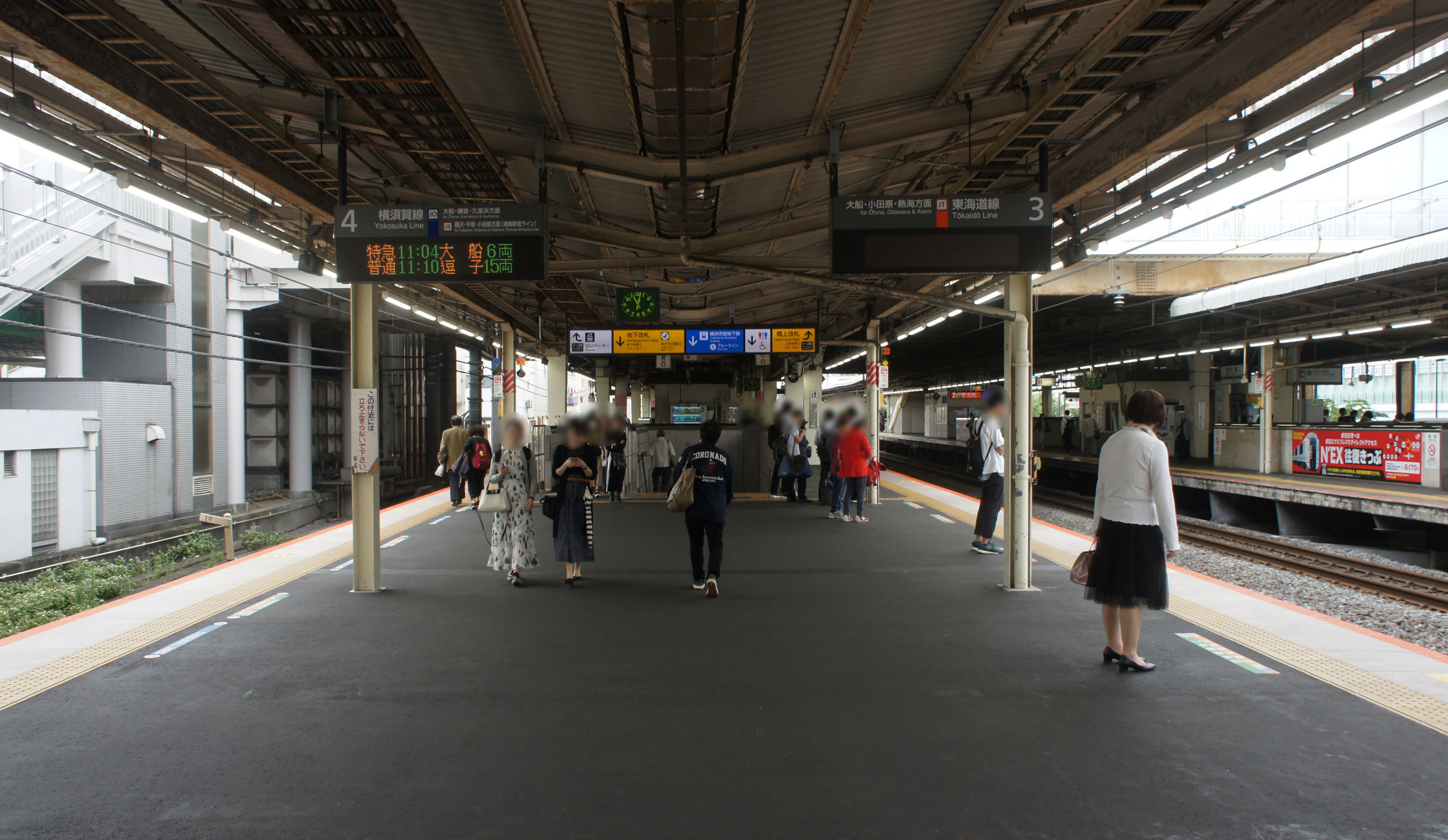
Platforms 3 and 4

=== Yokohama Municipal Subway platforms ===
1	Blue Line	for Shōnandai
2	Blue Line	for Kami-Ōoka, Kannai, Shin-Yokohama, and Azamino

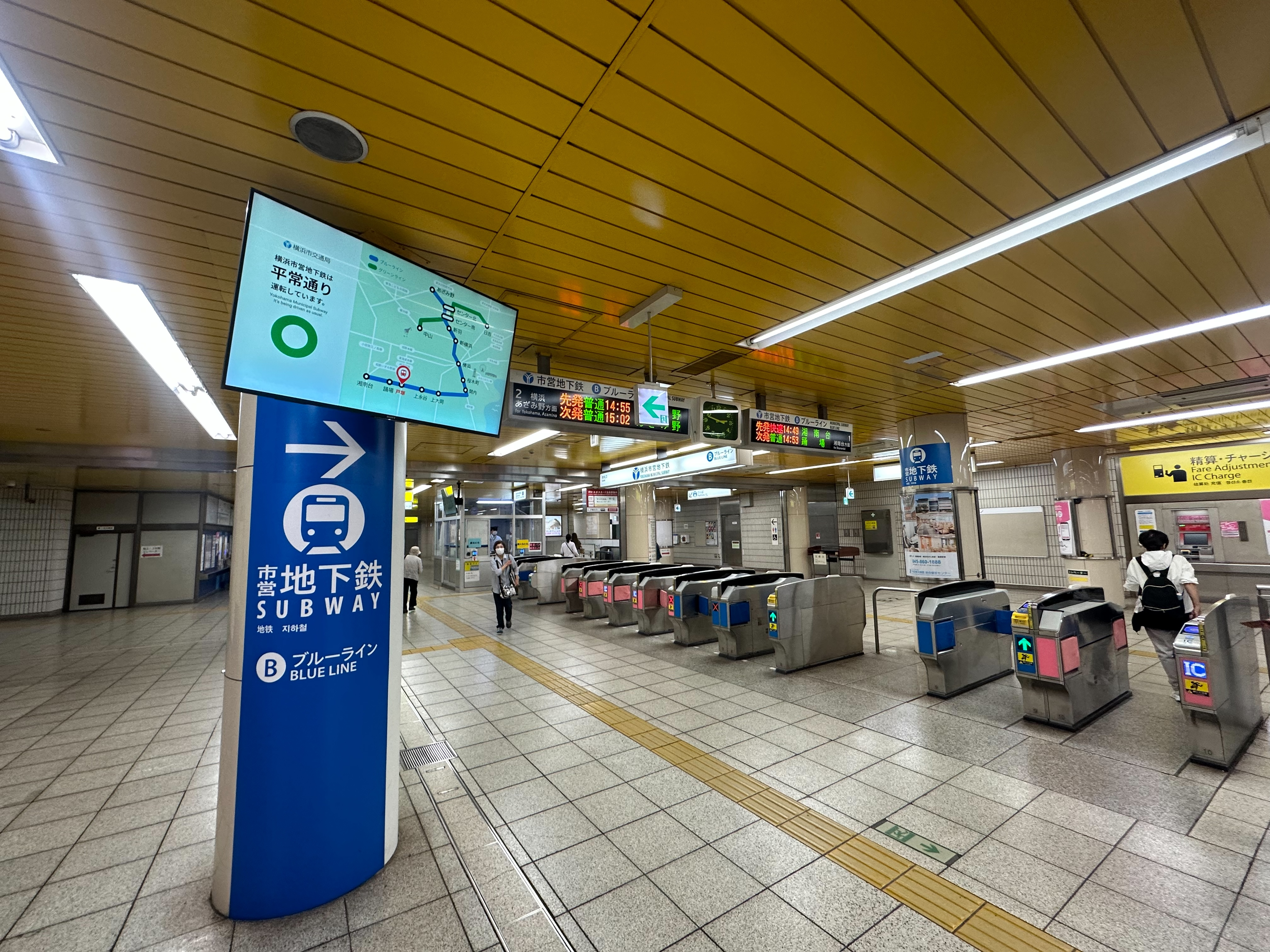
Ticket gates

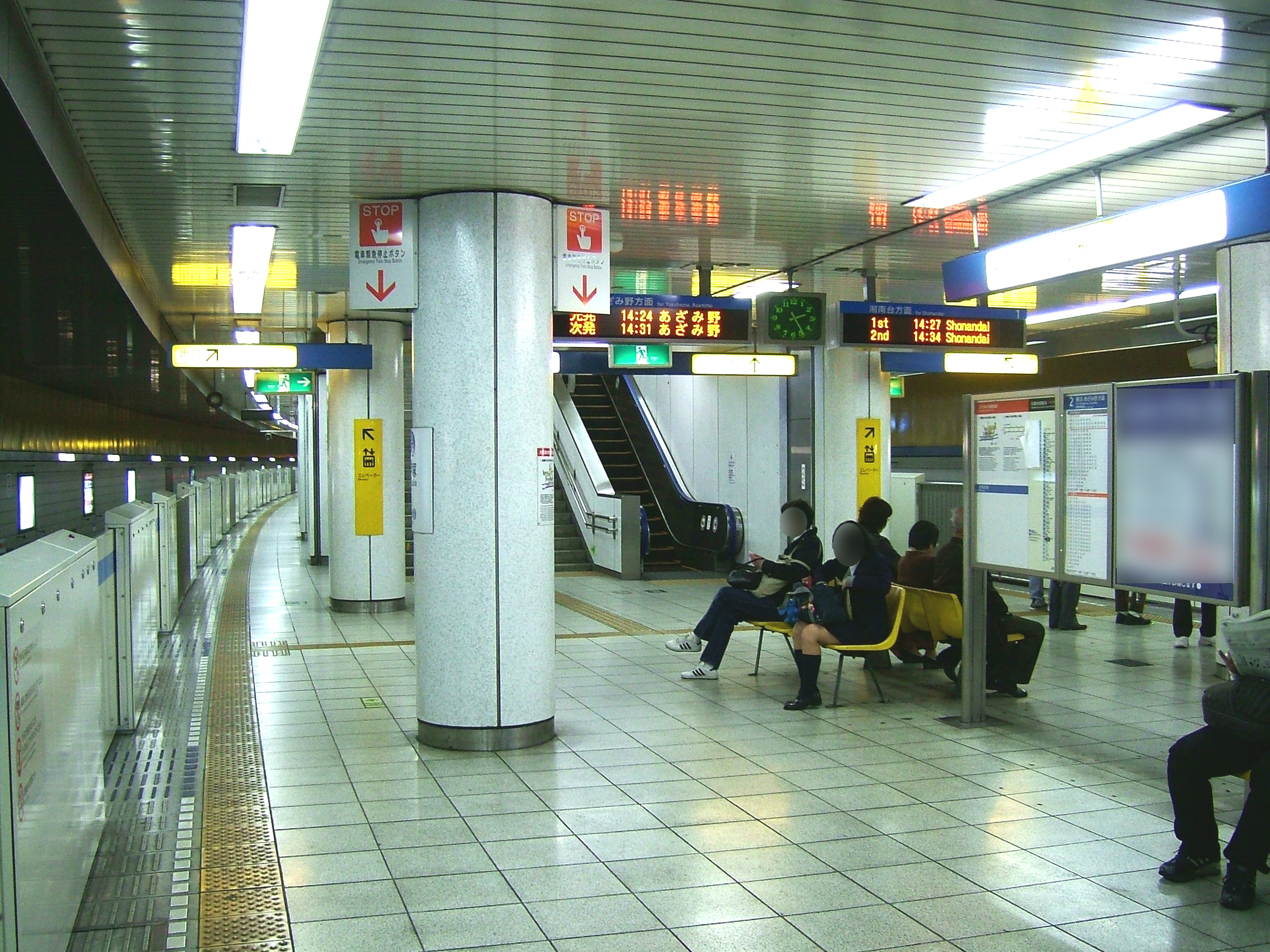
Platform

== History ==
=== JR East ===
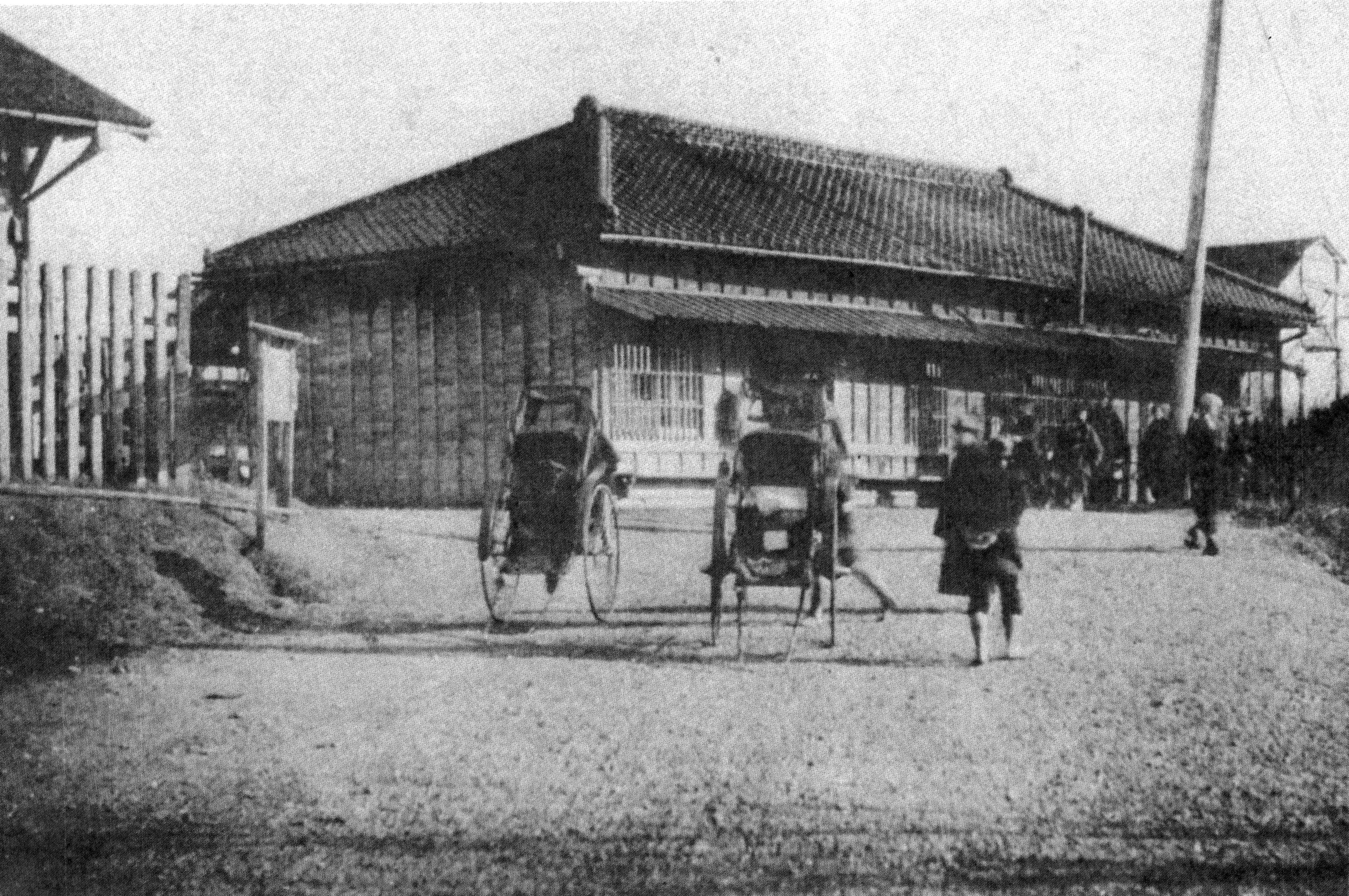
Totsuka Station in Meiji or Taishō period

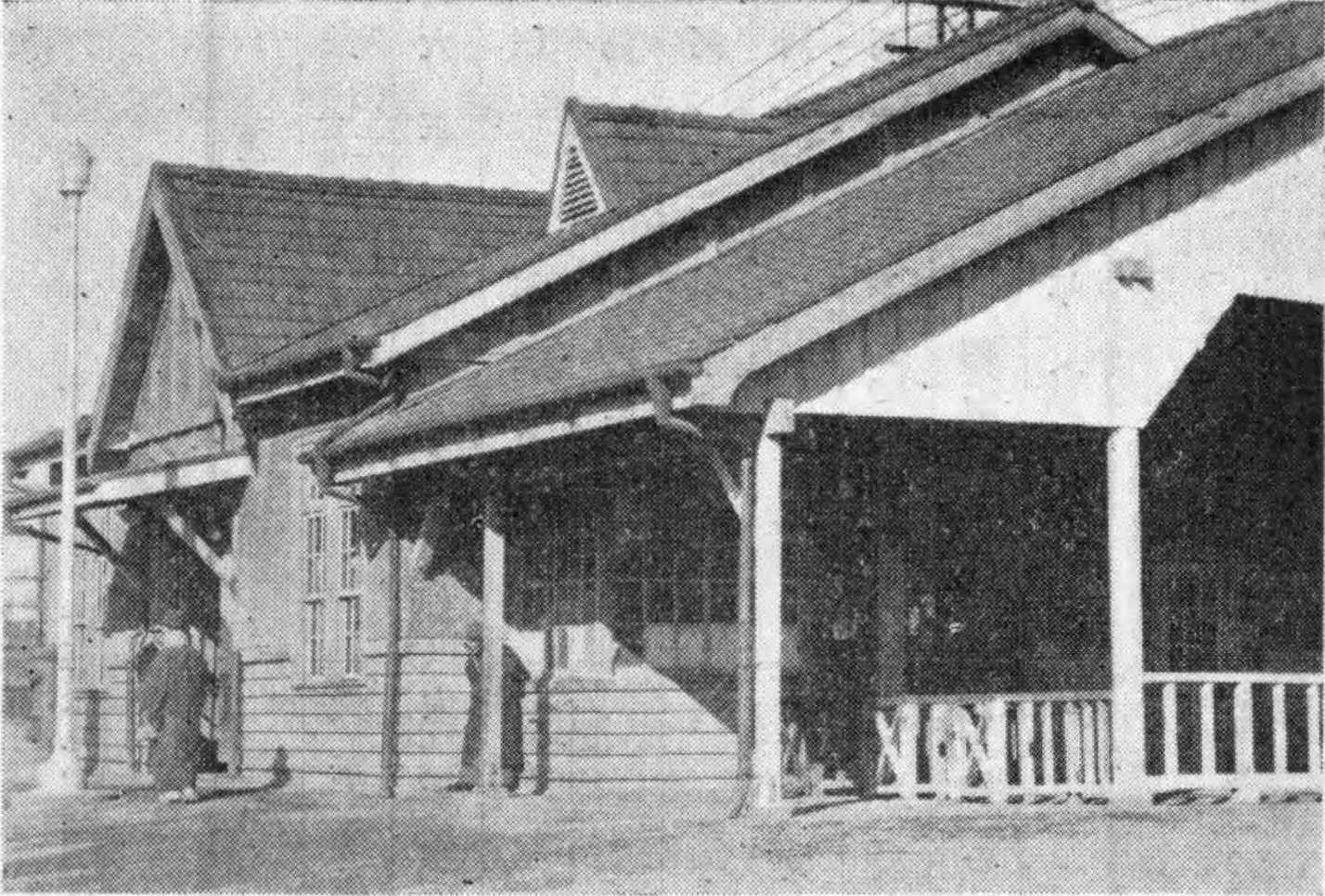
Totsuka Station, circa 1934

Totsuka Station was opened on July 11, 1887, as a station on the Japanese Government Railways (JGR), the predecessor to the post-war Japanese National Railways (JNR). The station building was originally on the west side of the station. The east gate was added in 1937. The current building over the tracks was completed on March 26, 1969.

On March 15, 1930, when Yokosuka Line trains were replaced by electric multiple units, all Tokaido Line trains ceased to stop at Totsuka Station. Before the Tokaido Line and Yokosuka Line were separated and the station became a junction of the two lines on October 1, 1980, the two lines used the same tracks, but only Yokosuka Line trains stopped at Totsuka Station. The current platforms 1 and 2 did not exist, and the platform 1 (now platform 3) served the Tokyo-bound Yokosuka Line, while line 2 (now line 4) served the away-from-Tokyo direction. Additionally, the current freight lines did not exist, with the old freight lines located where the current platforms 1 and 2 are. From March 1973 when one island platform was added, there were two island platforms, with platform 2 serving the Tokyo-bound trains, and platform 3 serving the other direction. The lines on platforms 1 and 4 were built, but were not used until 1980.

Originally, the station handled both passengers and freight. In 1923, a separate freight yard was completed as a part of the station to the north of the passenger platforms across the crossing with Tōkaidō Highway. All freight operations were discontinued from May 1970. As the addition of the new freight lines claimed the land of the bus terminal in front of the station's west gate, the bus terminal was relocated to the site of the former freight yard in July 1971. The bus terminal is now called the Second Bus Center and is distinguished from the larger Bus Center beside the Totsukana building on the same side of the station.

With the privatization of the JNR on April 1, 1987, the station came under the operational control of JR East. Shōnan-Shinjuku Line trains and Narita Express limited express services began stopping at Totsuka Station from December 1, 2001.

The timetable was revised on March 18, 2007, so that Tokaido Line Acty rapid trains all stopped at this station. This resolved the confusing situation that existed before, when the Shonan-Shinjuku Line rapid and special rapid trains stopped at the station, but Tokaido Line Acty services did not. Before the change, it was also the only station for changing trains at which the Acty did not stop. As before, the Tokaido Line commuter rapid still do not stop at this station.

=== Yokohama Municipal Subway ===
The Blue Line of the Yokohama Subway connected to Totsuka Station on 24 May 1987 with temporary facilities. The permanent subway station was opened on 27 August 1989.

== Accidents ==
At 05:42 on December 15, 1923, local passenger train No. 21 to Shimonoseki collided with the locomotive and a wagon of freight train No. 603, which was blocking the main line. Two locomotives and two wagons were overturned. As a result, the driver of train No. 603 was killed instantly and three passengers were slightly injured. The cause of the accident was a signalman's carelessness according to the official record of the railway.

At 09:52 on July 27, 1939, about 500 workers of a nearby Nippon Kōgaku factory entered the track near the station to see off a colleague. The semi-express train No. 221 to Numazu hit some of them, killing eight and injuring seven.

== Passenger statistics ==
In fiscal 2019, the station was used by an average of 112,598 passengers daily (boarding passengers only). In fiscal 2019, the Yokohama Municipal Subway station was used by an average of 44,137 passengers per day (boarding passengers only), making it the second busiest station on the Blue Line (after Yokohama)

The daily passenger figures (boarding passengers only) for previous years are as shown below.

Fiscal year	JR East	Blue Line
2005	101,458	37,020
2010	105,662	41,314
2015	110,797	44,016

== See also ==
- List of railway stations in Japan
