= Azamino Station =

Railway and metro station in Yokohama, Japan

B32 Azamino Station あざみ野駅

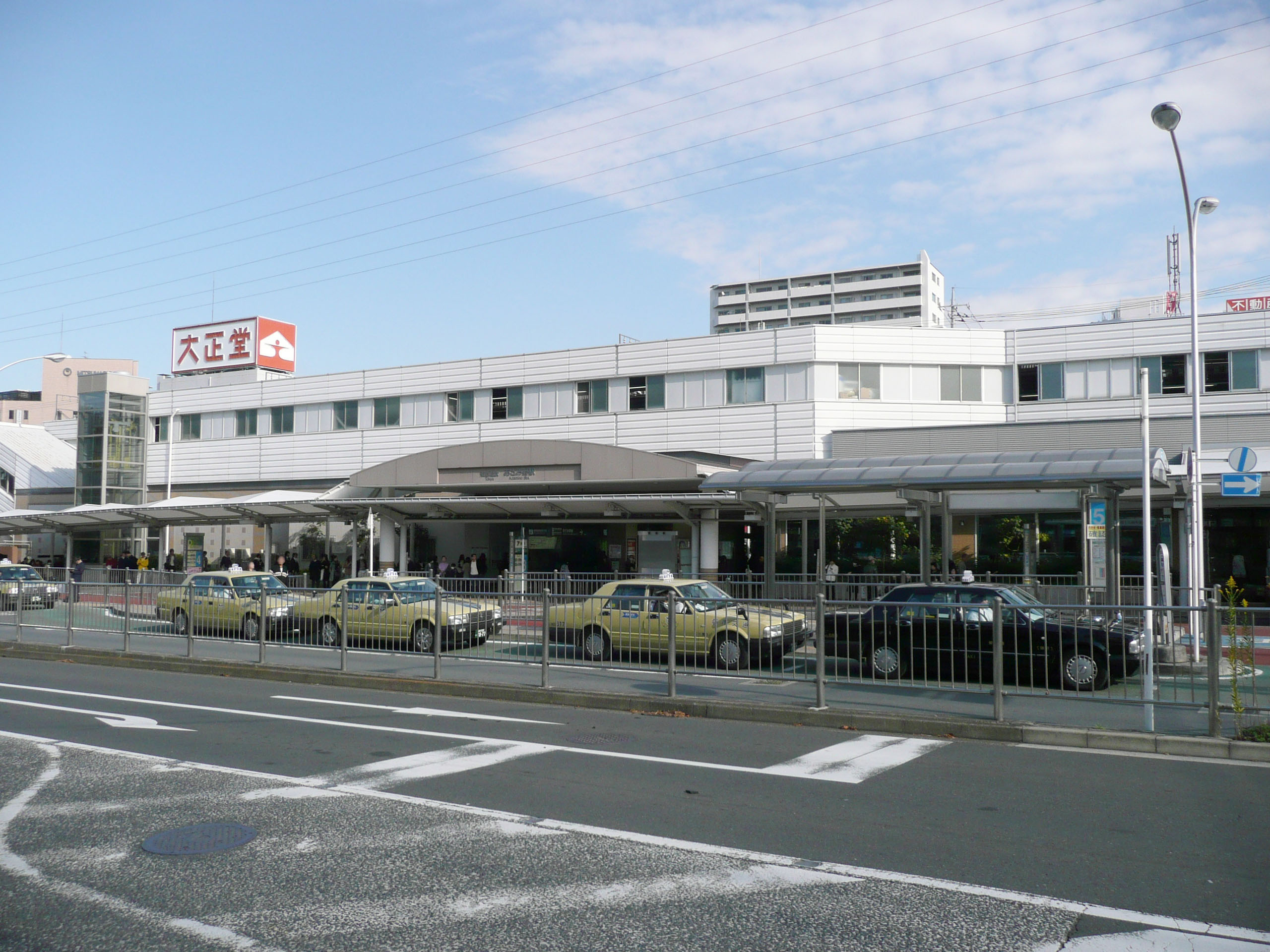
- Tōkyū Azamino Station

General information
- Location: Azamino 2-1-1, Aoba Ward, Yokohama City; Kanagawa Prefecture 225-0011; Japan
- Coordinates: 35°34′7.35″N 139°33′12.42″E
- Operator: Tōkyū Railways; Yokohama City Transportation Bureau
- Lines: Den-en-toshi Line; Blue Line
- Distance: 18.2 km (11.3 mi) from Shibuya
- Platforms: 2 side + 1 island platforms
- Connections: Bus stop

Other information
- Station code: DT16, B32

History
- Opened: 25 May 1977; 49 years ago

Passengers
- FY2019 (Daily): 136,108 (Tōkyū); 80,055 (Blue Line)

Services
Preceding station	Tōkyū Railways	Following station
Aobadai towards Chūō-rinkan	Den-en-toshi Line Express Semi Express	Tama-plaza towards Shibuya
Eda towards Chūō-rinkan	Den-en-toshi Line Local	Tama-plaza towards Shibuya
Preceding station	Yokohama Municipal Subway	Following station
Nakagawa B31 towards Shonandai	Blue Line Rapid Local	Terminus
Location
- Location within Yokohama Location within Kanagawa Prefecture Location within Tokyo Bay and Bōsō Peninsula Location within Japan

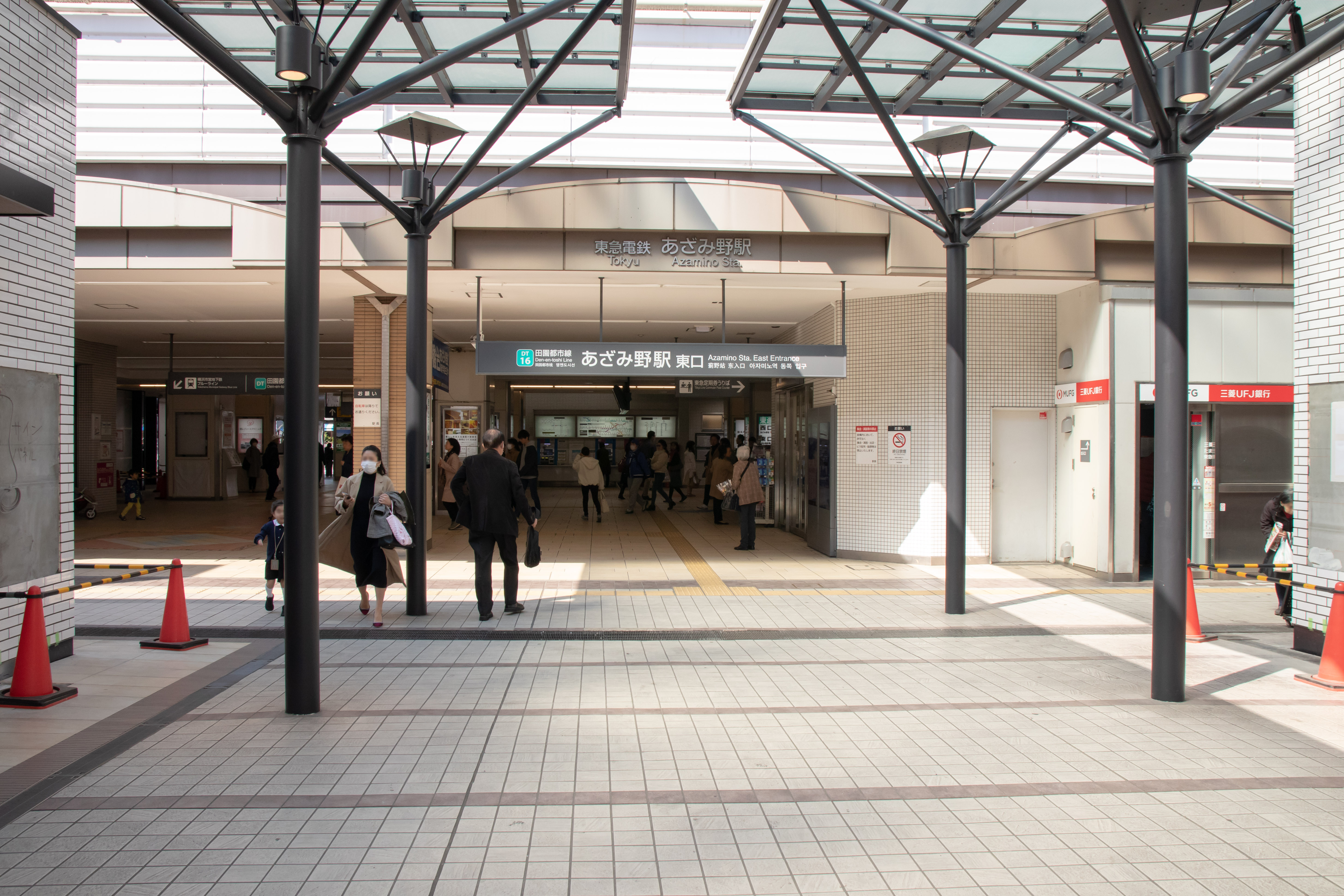
East entrance

Azamino Station (あざみ野駅, Azamino-eki) is an interchange railway station located in the Azamino neighborhood of Aoba-ku, Yokohama, Kanagawa Prefecture, Japan, operated by the private railway company, Tokyu Corporation and by the Yokohama City Transportation Bureau.

== Lines ==
Azamino Station is served by the Tōkyū Den-en-toshi Line and is 18.2 kilometers from the terminus of the line at Shibuya. It is also a terminal station of the Yokohama subway's Blue Line and is 20.7 kilometers from the terminus of the line at Shōnandai.

== Station layout ==
=== Tōkyū Den-en-toshi Line ===
Tōkyū Azamino Station has line has two opposed side platforms serving two tracks on the second floor of the station building.

==== Platforms ====
1	■ Tōkyū Den-en-toshi Line	Nagatsuta・Chūō-rinkan
2	■ Tōkyū Den-en-toshi Line	Futako-tamagawa・Shibuya・Oshiage (Tokyo Metro Hanzōmon Line)・Kasukabe (Tōbu Isesaki Line)

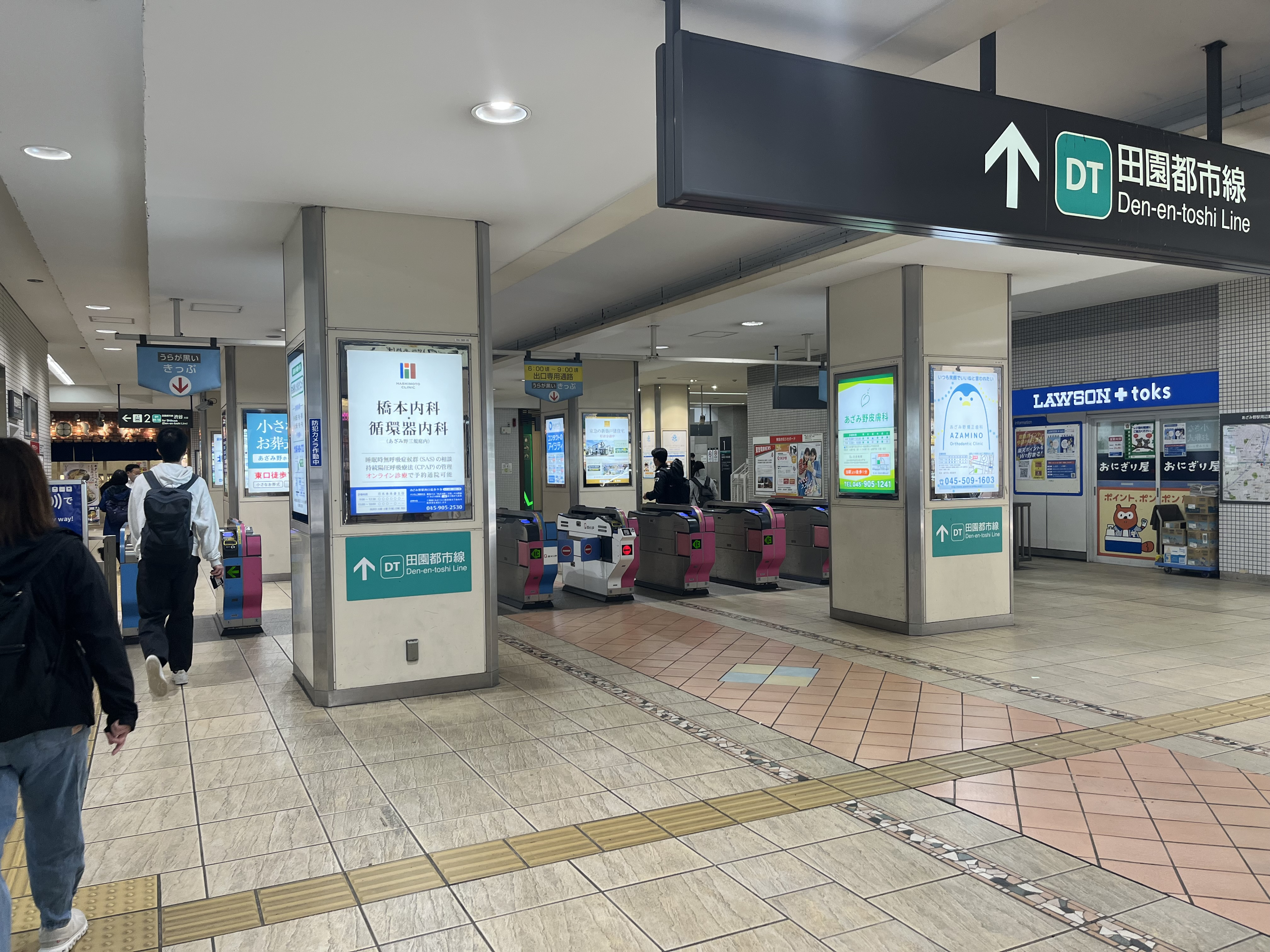
Ticket gates

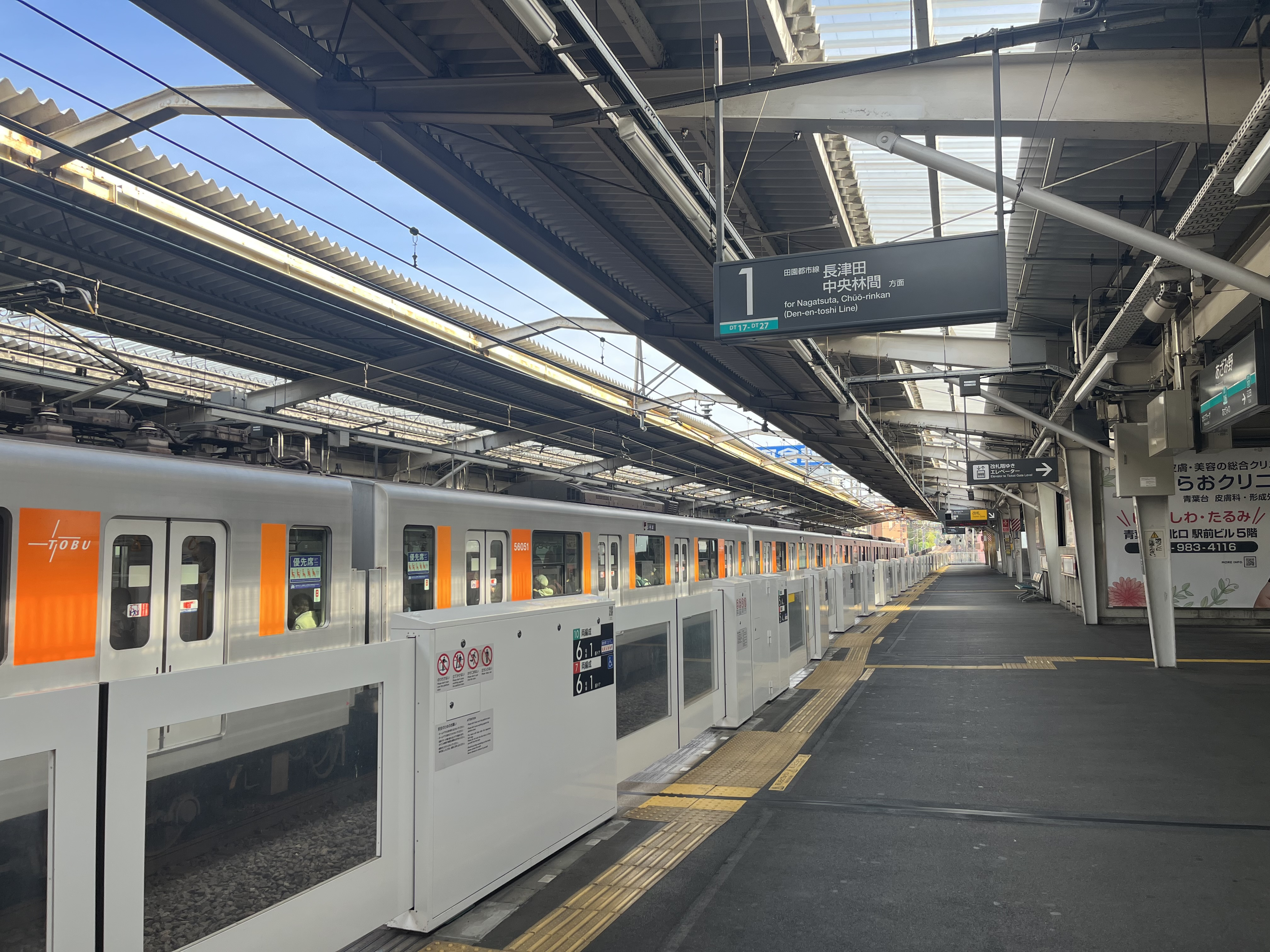
Platform

=== Yokohama Municipal Subway Blue Line ===
The underground Blue Line station has a single island platform.

==== Platforms ====
1	■ Blue Line (Yokohama)	Shin-Yokohama ・ Yokohama・ Kannai・ Totsuka・ Shōnandai
2	■ Blue Line (Yokohama)	Shin-Yokohama ・ Yokohama・ Kannai・ Totsuka・ Shōnandai

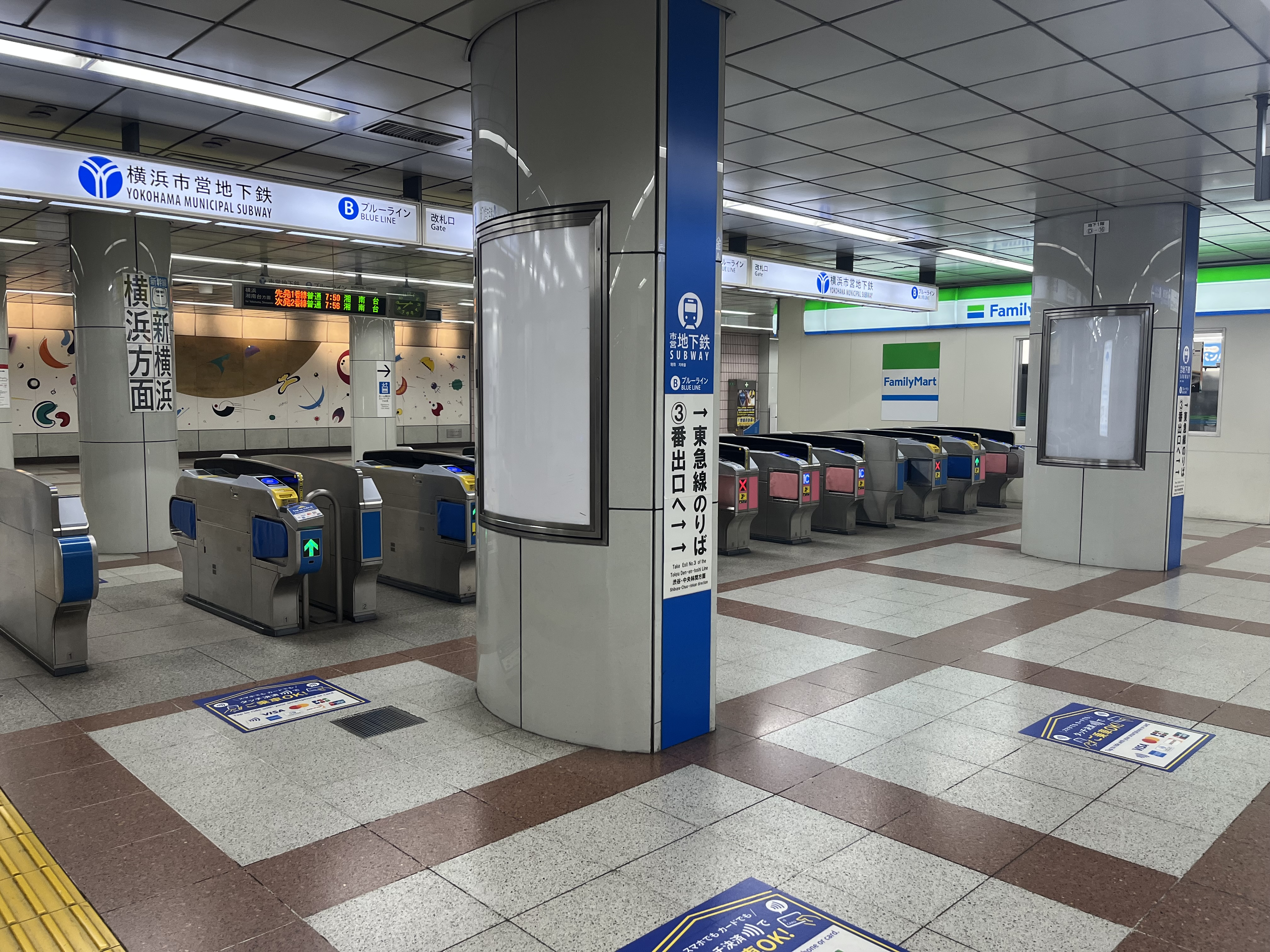
Ticket gates

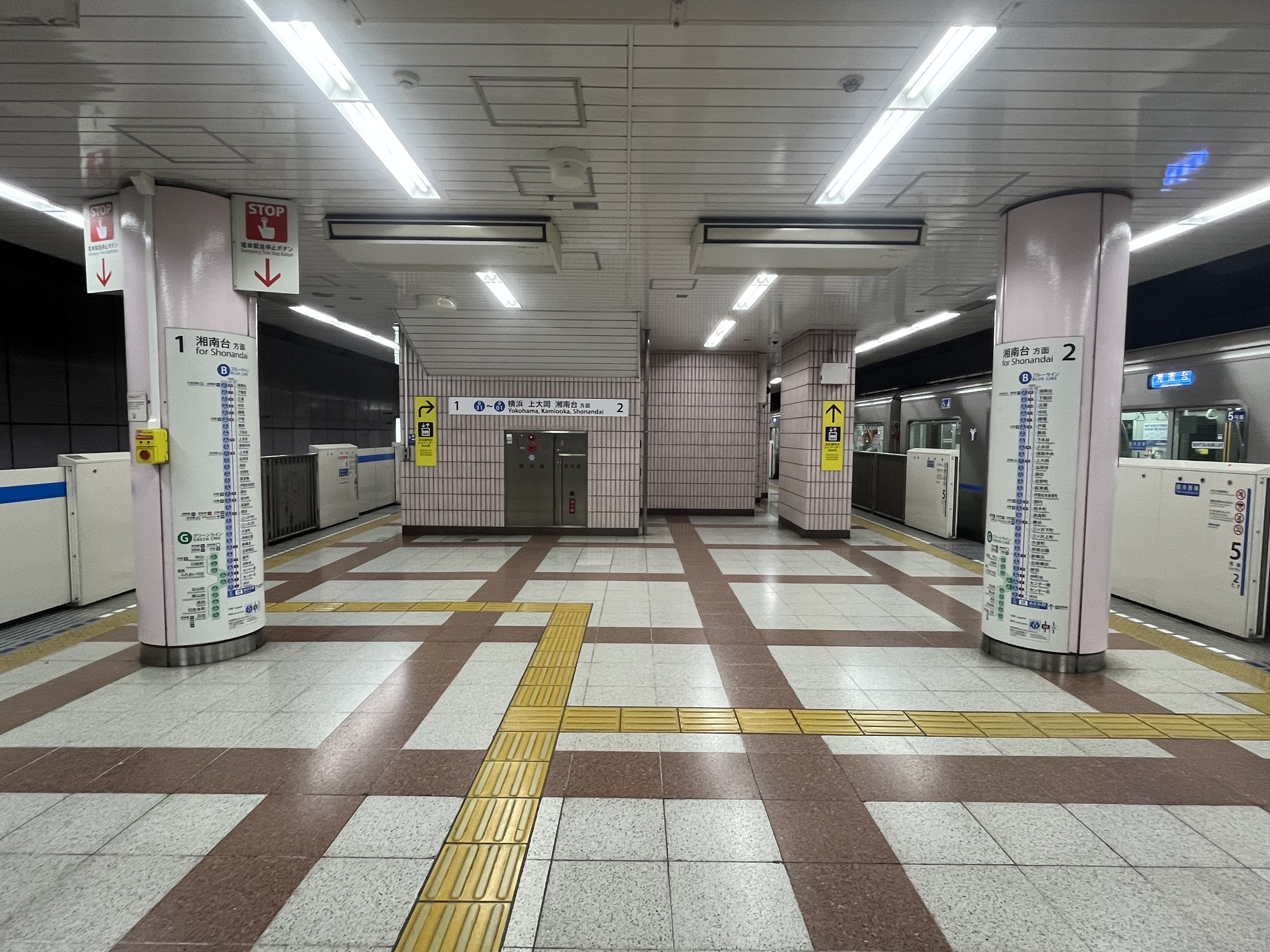
Platform

== History ==
Azamino Station was opened on 25 May 1977, as a station on the Den-en-toshi Line. The Yokohama subway connected Azamino to Shin-Yokohama Station on 18 March 1993.

== Passenger statistics ==
In fiscal 2019, the Tōkyū station was used by an average of 136,108 passengers daily. During the same period, the Yokohama Subway station was used by an average of 80,055 passengers daily.

The daily average passenger figures for previous years are as shown below.

Fiscal year	Tōkyū	Yokohama Subway
2005	125,464	81,992
2010	129,393	77,158
2015	134,691	80,176

== See also ==
- List of railway stations in Japan
