= Yokohama City Transportation Bureau =

Local government administrative agency

Transportation Bureau, City of Yokohama
- Monshō of the Transportation Bureau

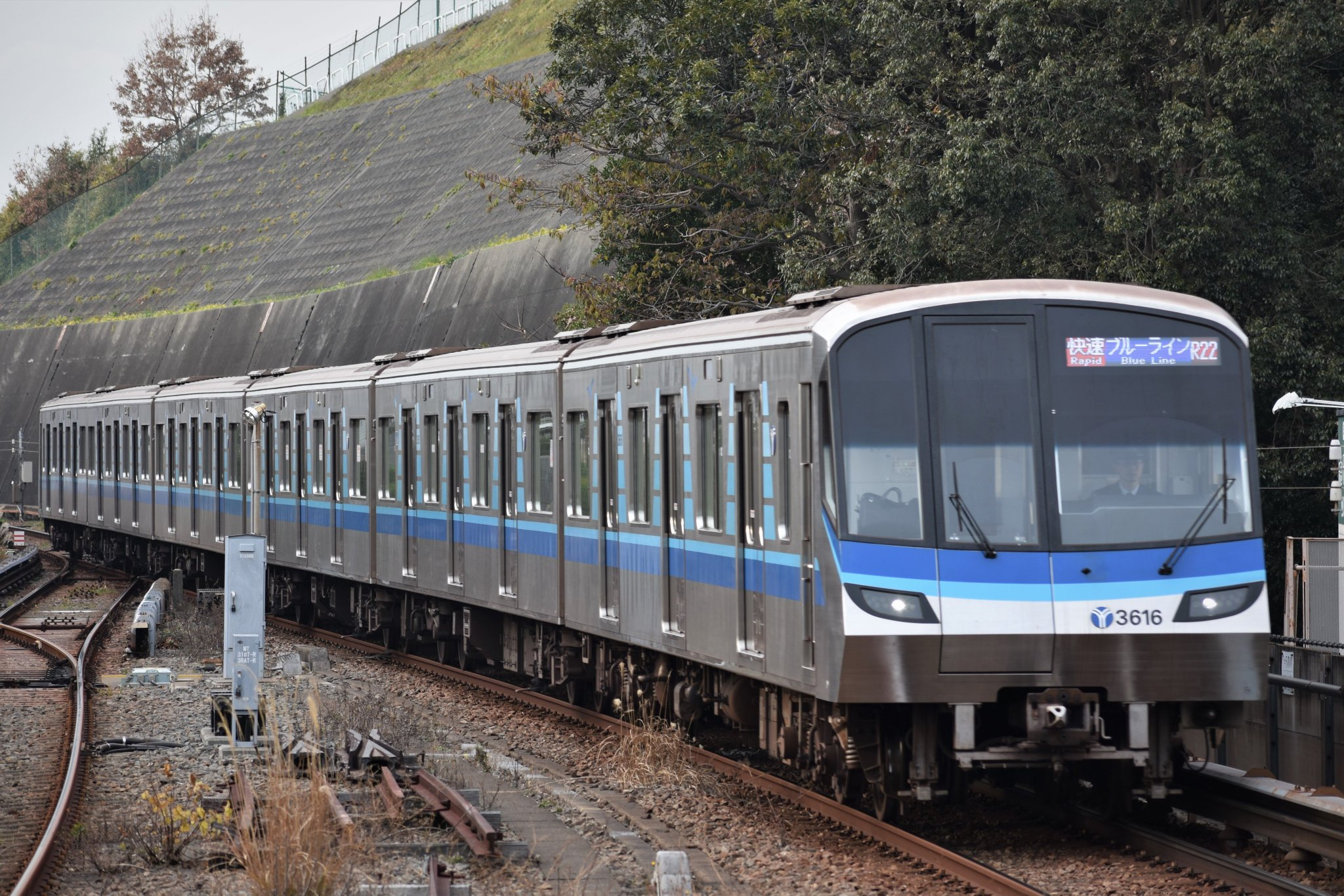
- 3000 series train on the Subway Blue Line
- Native name: 横浜市交通局
- Romanized name: Yokohama-shi Kōtsū-kyoku
- Founded: April 1, 1921
- Headquarters: Naka-ku, Yokohama
- Area served: Yokohama
- Website: www.city.yokohama.lg.jp/kotsu/

The Yokohama City Transportation Bureau, legally the Transportation Bureau, City of Yokohama (横浜市交通局, Yokohama-shi Kōtsū-kyoku) is the local government administrative agency in charge of public transport services in the city of Yokohama, Japan.

== Subway operations ==
The Yokohama Municipal Subway consists of the following lines:

- Line 1 (Blue Line), from Kannai to Shōnandai, via Kami-Ōoka, Totsuka
- Line 3 (Blue Line), from Kannai to Azamino, via Sakuragichō, Yokohama and Shin-Yokohama.
- Line 4 (Green Line), from Hiyoshi to Nakayama

Lines 1 and 3 operate with trains running through from Shonandai to Azamino. At 40.4 km, this is the second-longest subway in Japan after the Toei Ōedo Line in Tokyo.

The missing Line 2 was planned to connect Kanagawa-Shinmachi Station with Byōbugaura Station, along the Keikyū Main Line, but has been cancelled.

Although it runs entirely underground, the Minatomirai Line is not considered part of the subway network, and is not administered by the Transportation Bureau, but by the Yokohama Minatomirai Railway Company.

== Bus operations ==
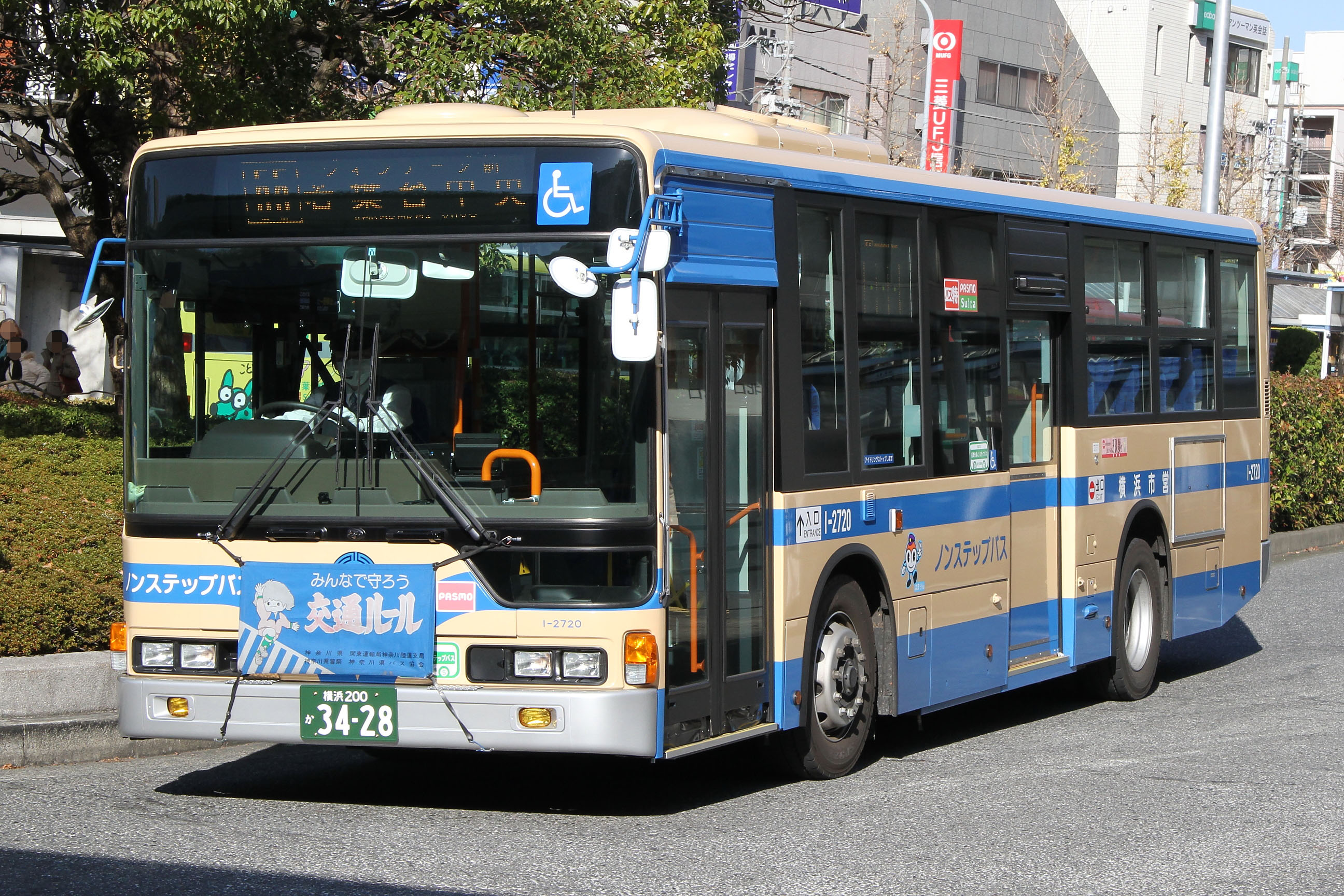
A fleet of Yokohama Municipal Bus

City bus services encompass 156 regular and sightseeing bus routes with 1,345 bus stops and a fleet of 1,002 vehicles.
