= Gumyōji =

Neighborhood in Yokohama

Coordinates: 35°25′28″N 139°35′55″E

Gumyōji (弘明寺町, Gumyōji-chō) is a neighborhood located in Minami-ku in the city of Yokohama in Kanagawa Prefecture, Japan. In reference to the Keikyu Line, it is between Kami-Ōoka and Idogaya Stations.

Within Gumyōji is the temple, Gumyō-ji, from which it gets its name. Also located within Gumyōji are the Ōoka Harappa park, Minami Library, Miurayu Onsen, the Kannon Dōri Shopping Street, Minami Police Station, the Open University of Japan, and the Uny store.

== Gumyō-ji ==
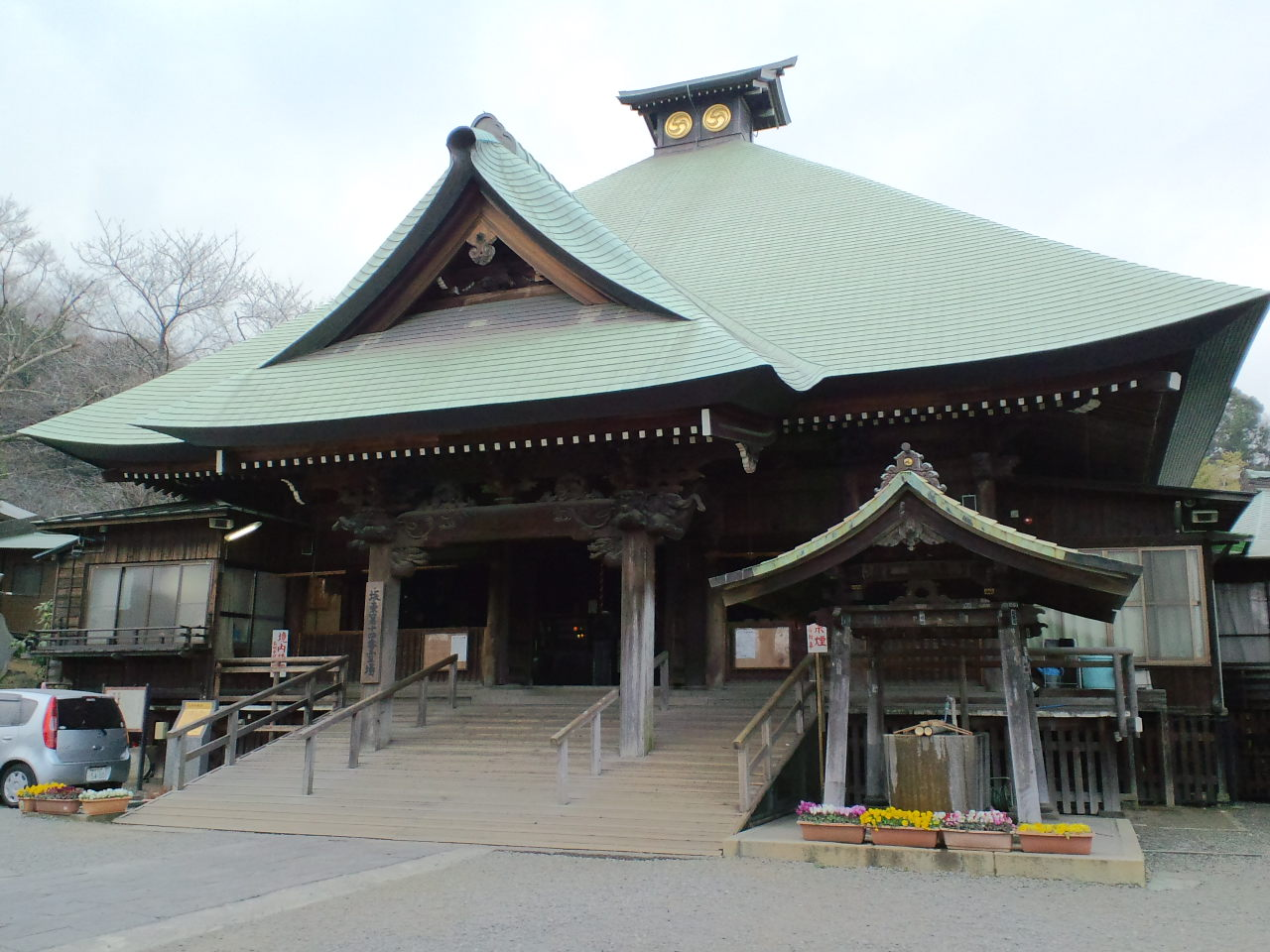
Gumyō-ji in 2009

Gumyō-ji is a Kōyasan Shingon-shū temple. According to temple legend, it was founded by Gyōki in 737, making it the oldest temple in Yokohama, but it is believed to have actually been founded in 1044. The temple was originally named Gumyō-ji (求明寺) during the Kamakura period but was renamed Gumyō-ji (弘明寺). The mountain behind the temple, once part of the temple grounds, is now Gumyō-ji Park. Its temple grounds are depicted in the 1834 Edo meisho zue. In 1901, the Gumyō-ji Preservation Society was established to restore the temple.

It houses a wooden statue of Jūichimen Kannon, 14th of the Bandō Sanjūsankasho, as well as the painting Senju Kannon with Twenty-Eight Attendants, from the late Kamakura period, which has been designated a Prefectural Culture Property.

== Minami Police Station ==
The Minami Police Station was built in 1983. The following table lists the number of crimes that occurred during 2006 and 2008 throughout Minami-ku.

throughout Minami-ku
	2007	2006
Theft related crimes	104	133
Bikes reported stolen	381	331
Total crimes reported	2430	2843

In 2008 there were a record of 766 traffic accidents in which 1 person died, 66 people were heavily injured, and 829 had minor injuries.

== Minami Library ==
The Minami Library is two stories tall. The Minami Library sits directly behind Gumyōji Station. The children's book section and front desk are on the first floor of the library. On the second floor are the general books section, newspapers, magazines, and an area reserved for studying. Three times a month, every second Saturday, third Tuesday, and fourth Wednesday there is a small event for children where they gather with the staff to learn, read books and play.

== Minami Sports Center ==
The Minami Sports Center is the main recreational center of Gumyōji. Here people can partake in various sports, including badminton (8000 yen fee for 10 classes); table tennis (6000 yen fee for 10 classes); exercise for the elderly (2500 yen for 10 classes); dance (2500 yen for 10 classes); and tai chi (4000 yen for 10 classes).

== Open University of Japan ==
In Gumyōji is one of the locations of the Open University of Japan. 5500 students attend this college, and about 90,000 students in total attend throughout all campuses. The school offers life science, industrial society, humanities, and natural science. There is also a tennis court located at the school for recreation.

== Kannon Dōri Shopping Street ==
The Kannon Dōri Shopping Street is a path that runs between the Gumyōji Subway and the Gumyōji Keikyu Line. This is also one of the most commonly taken paths in order to get to the Gumyōji Keikyu Line. Kannon Dōri is lined with stores and street is covered in an arcade protecting pedestrians from rain. These stores serve mainly neighborhood residents and include fruit and vegetable stores, shops selling Japanese tea, pharmacy, a takoyaki-okonomiyaki shop, etc.

UNY, a chain of grocery stores located throughout Japan, also has a store is located near the Kannon Dōri Shopping Street. Uny is a three-story building. The first floor is a grocery store, while the second and third floors have household goods and a 100-yen shop.

The Kannon Bridge near the center of the Kannon Dōri Shopping Street is a popular meeting spot during the spring time because of the several cherry blossom trees lining the river which passes under the bridge.

== Ōoka Harappa ==
Ōoka Harappa is one of the parks within Gumyōji near the Minami Sports Center. Every year the people of Gumyōji celebrate various festivals and events here. Some of those events include the Bon Festival and occasional flea markets. The park is always open to the public; it is popular amongst young children as an after school activity.
