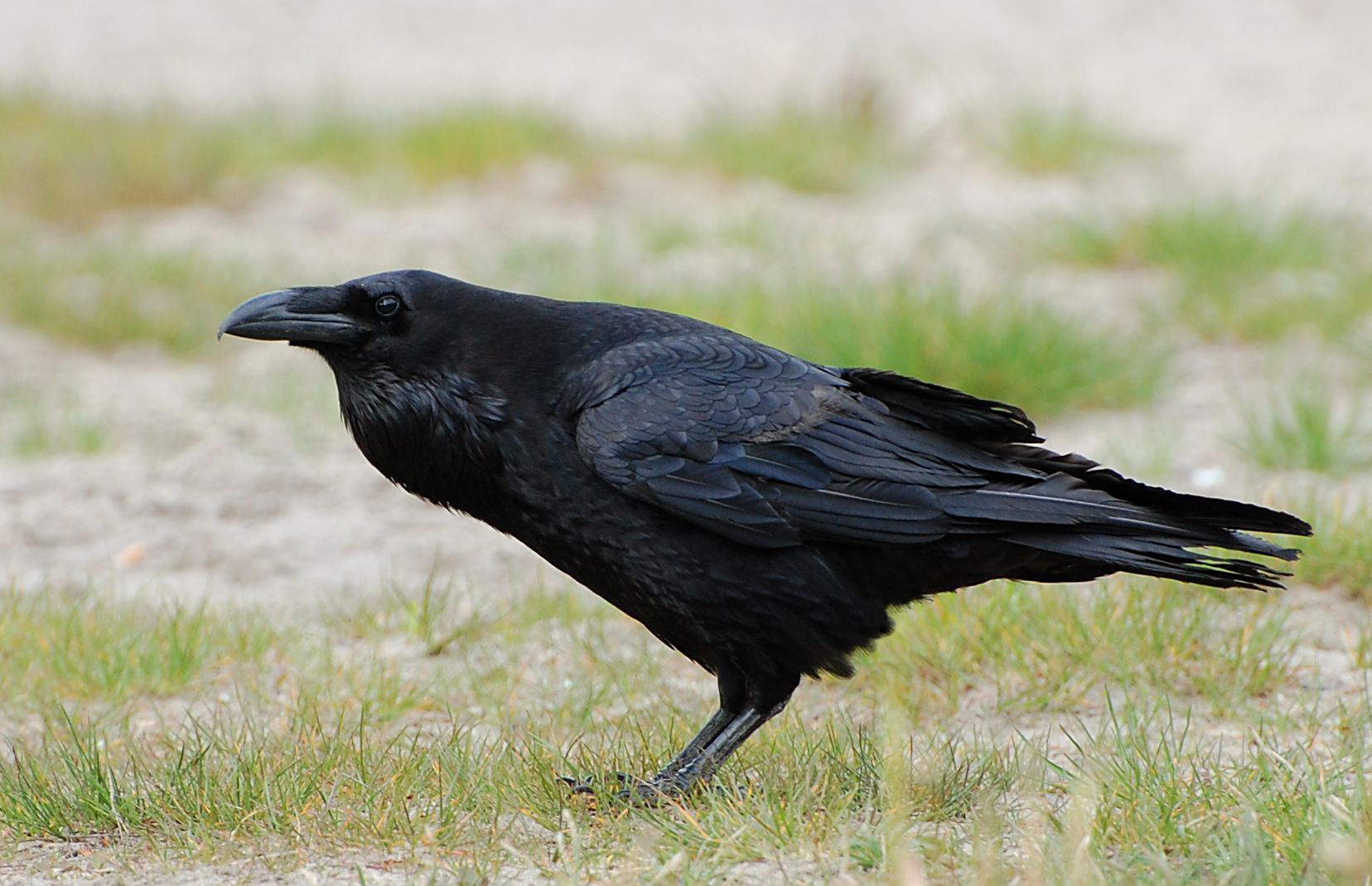
- Common raven (Corvus corax)

Scientific classification
- Kingdom: Animalia
- Phylum: Chordata
- Class: Aves
- Order: Passeriformes
- Family: Corvidae
- Subfamily: Corvinae
- Genus: Corvus; Linnaeus, 1758

Type species
- Corvus corax Linnaeus, 1758

Species
- Many, see List of Corvus species

Diversity
- 50 species

= Corvus =

Corvus Temporal range: 5–0 Ma Late Miocene origin based on molecular clock

Genus of birds including crows, ravens and rooks

Corvus is a widely distributed genus of passerine birds ranging from medium-sized to large-sized in the family Corvidae. It includes species commonly known as crows, ravens, and rooks. The species commonly encountered in Europe are the carrion crow, hooded crow, common raven, and rook; those discovered later were named "crow" or "raven" chiefly on the basis of their size, crows generally being smaller. The genus name is Latin for "raven".

The 46 or so members of this genus occur on all continents except South America, Antarctica and several islands. The genus Corvus makes up a third of the species in the family Corvidae. The members appear to have evolved in Asia from the corvid stock, which had evolved in Australia. The collective name for a group of crows is a "flock" or a "murder".

In 2002, research found that some crow species are capable of not only tool use, but also tool construction. Crows are now considered to be among the world's most intelligent animals with an encephalization quotient equal to that of many non-human primates.

== Description ==
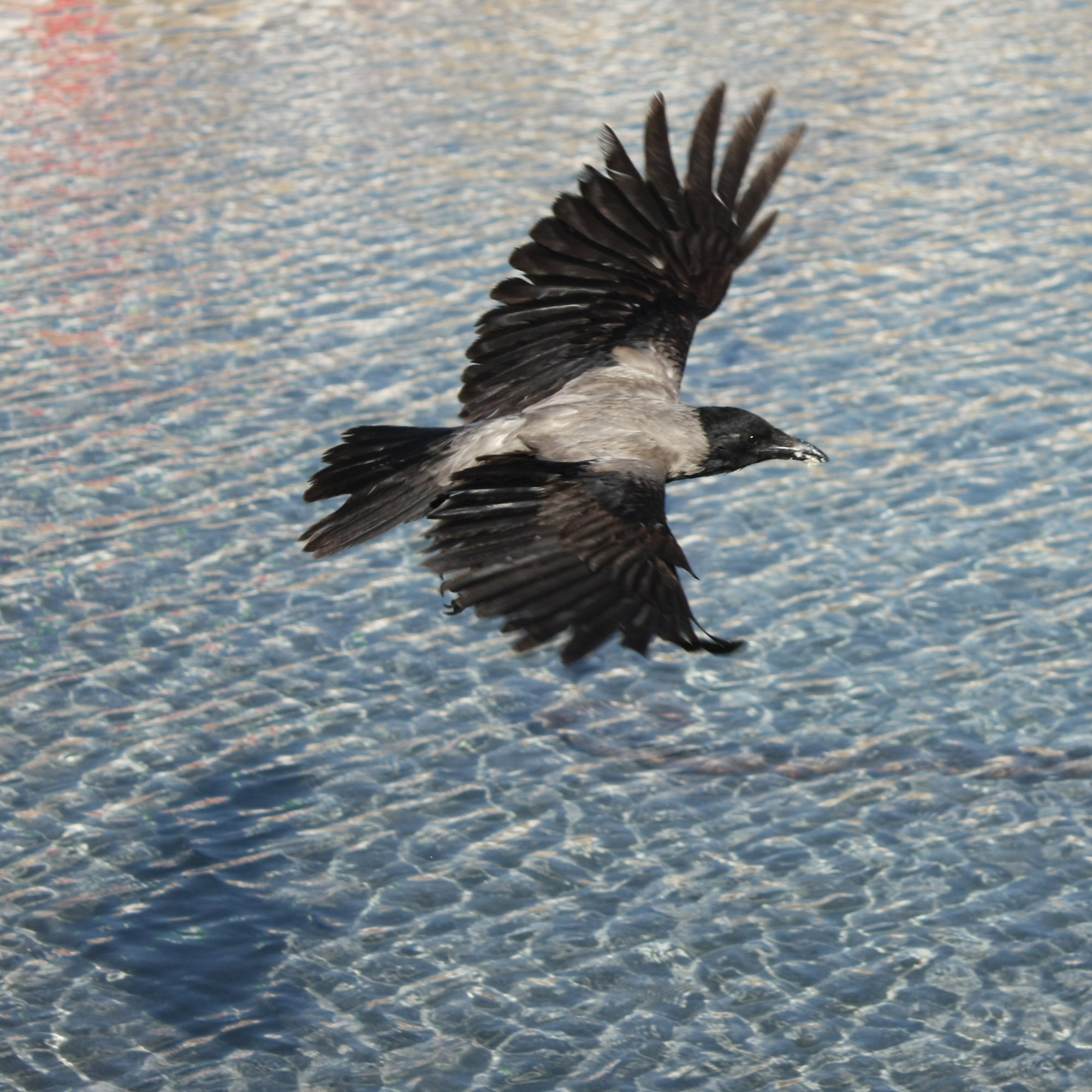
Hooded crow (Corvus cornix) in flight

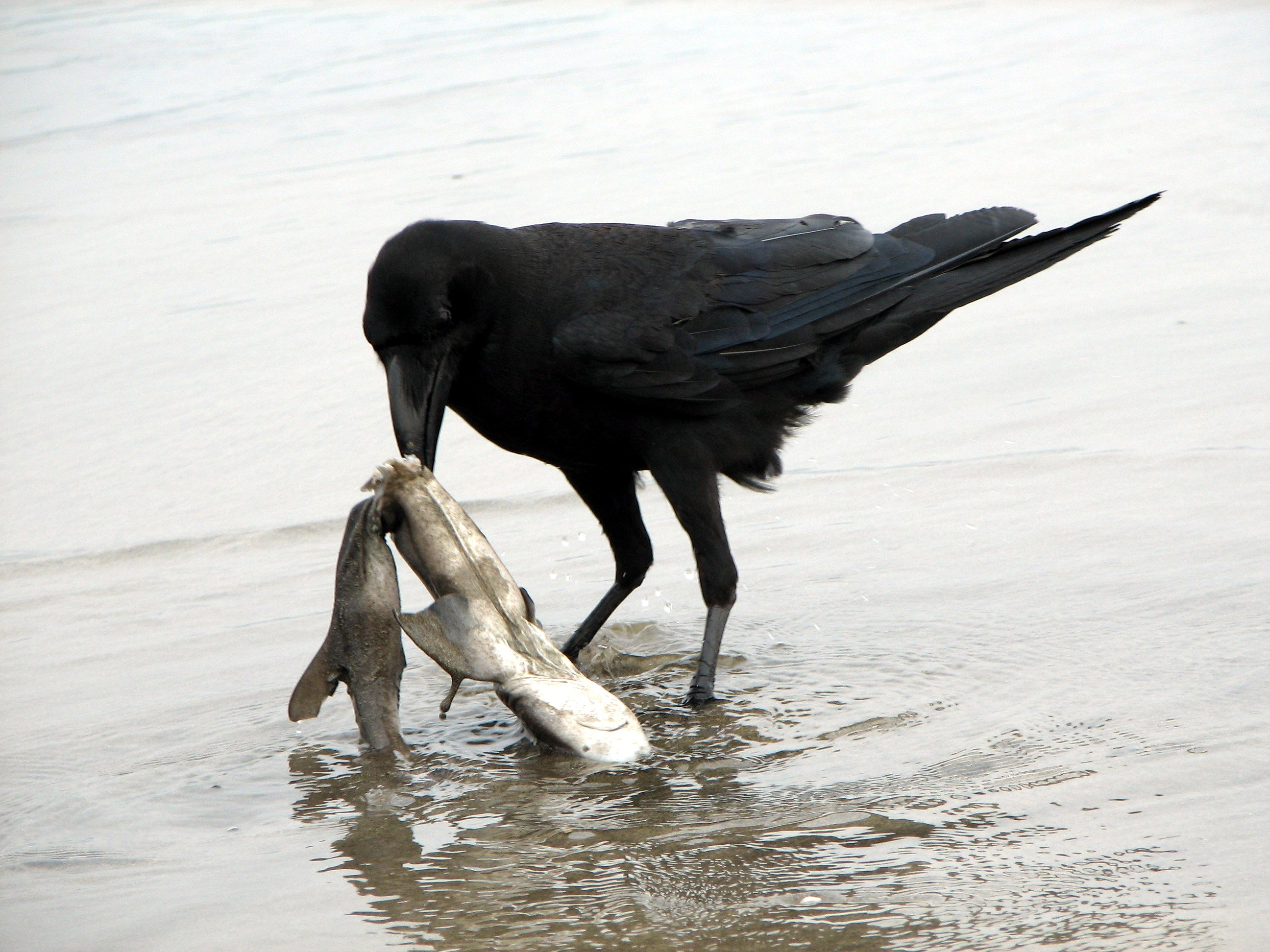
Jungle crow (Corvus macrorhynchos) scavenging on a dead shark at a beach in Kumamoto, Japan

Medium-large species are ascribed to the genus, ranging from 34 cm (13 in) of some small Mexican species to 60–70 cm (24–28 in) of the large common raven and thick-billed raven, which together with the lyrebird represent the larger passerines.

These are birds with a robust and slender appearance, equipped with a small, rounded head with a strong, conical beak, elongated and pointed, with a slightly curved end towards the bottom; the legs are strong and the tail is short and wedge-shaped.

The coloration of the livery is dominated by shades of black, with some species having plumage with metallic iridescence and others that have white or gray areas on the neck or torso. Australian species have light eyes, while generally the irises of other species are dark.

Sexual dimorphism is limited.

== Evolutionary history and systematics ==
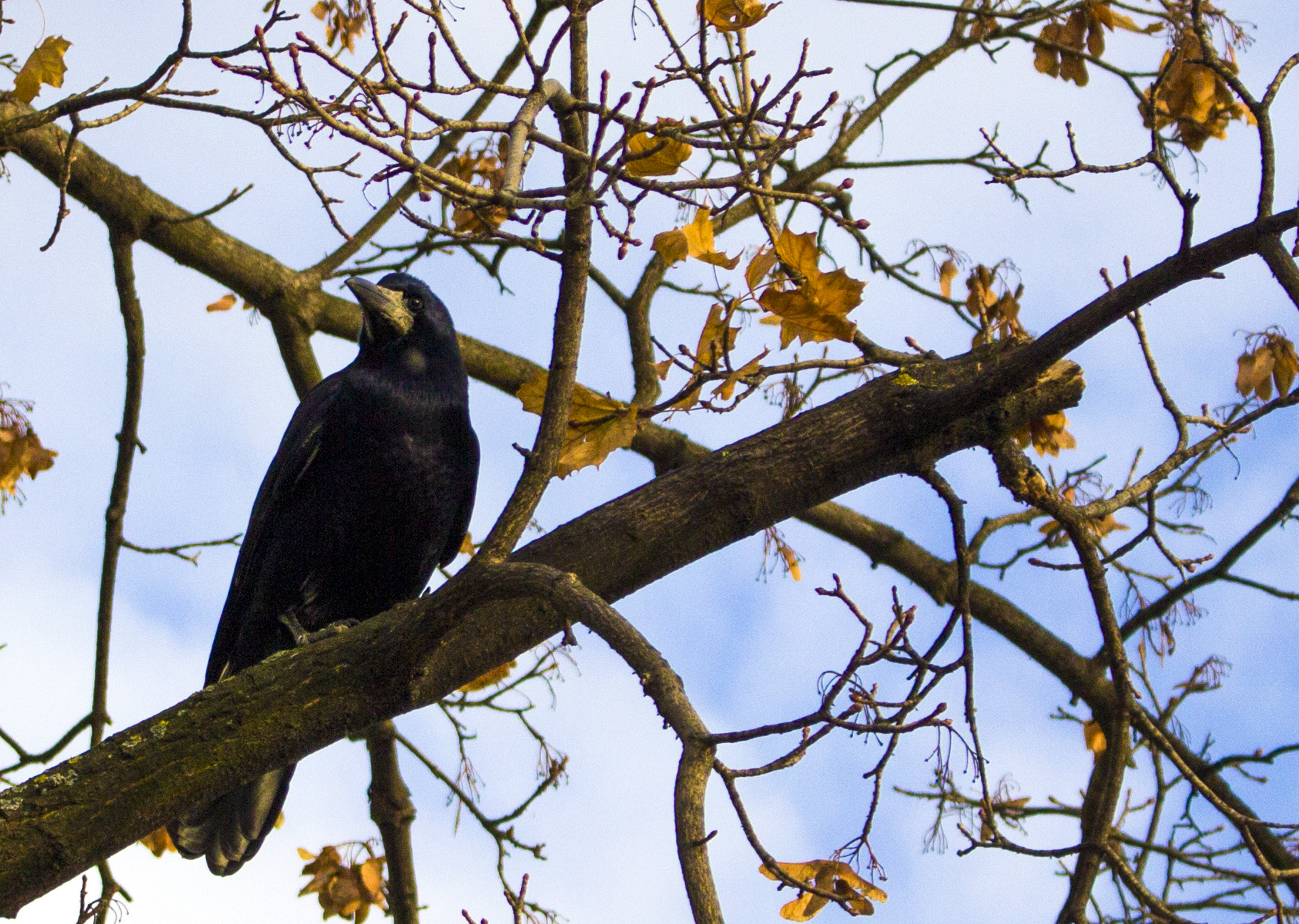
Rook (Corvus frugilegus) on a branch

The members of the genus Corvus are believed to have evolved in Central Asia and radiated out from there into North America, Africa, Europe, and Australia. The center of diversity of Corvus is within Melanesia, Wallacea, and the island of New Guinea and surrounding islands, with numerous species endemic to islands in the area; other areas with a large number of crow species include South and Southeast Asia, East Africa, and Australia. A high density of endemics is also present in Mexico and the Caribbean.

The diversification of Corvus corresponded with a quick geographic expansion. The radiation of the genus resulted in rapid expansion of morphological diversity and fast speciation rates, especially around the beginning of the genus' radiation around 10 million years ago.

The fossil record of crows is rather dense in Europe, but the relationships among most prehistoric species are not clear. Early Pleistocene fossils of crows indeterminate to the species level are known from the Nihewan Basin of China.

The genus was originally described by Carl Linnaeus in his 1758 10th edition of Systema Naturae. The name is derived from the Latin corvus meaning "raven". The type species is the common raven (Corvus corax); others named by Linnaeus in the same work include the carrion crow (C. corone), hooded crow (C. cornix), rook (C. frugilegus), and two species which have since been moved to other genera, the western jackdaw (now Coloeus monedula) and the Eurasian magpie (now Pica pica). At least 42 extant species are now considered to be members of Corvus, and at least 14 extinct species have been described.

Corvids are found in major cities across the world, and a major increase in the number of crows in urban settings has occurred since the 1900s. Historical records suggest that the population of American crows found in North America has been growing steadily since the introduction of European colonization, and spread east to west with the opening of the frontier. Crows were uncommon in the Pacific Northwest in the 1900s, except in riparian habitats. Populations in the west increased substantially from the late 1800s to the mid-1900s. Crows and ravens spread along with agriculture and urbanization into the western part of North America.

== Behavior ==
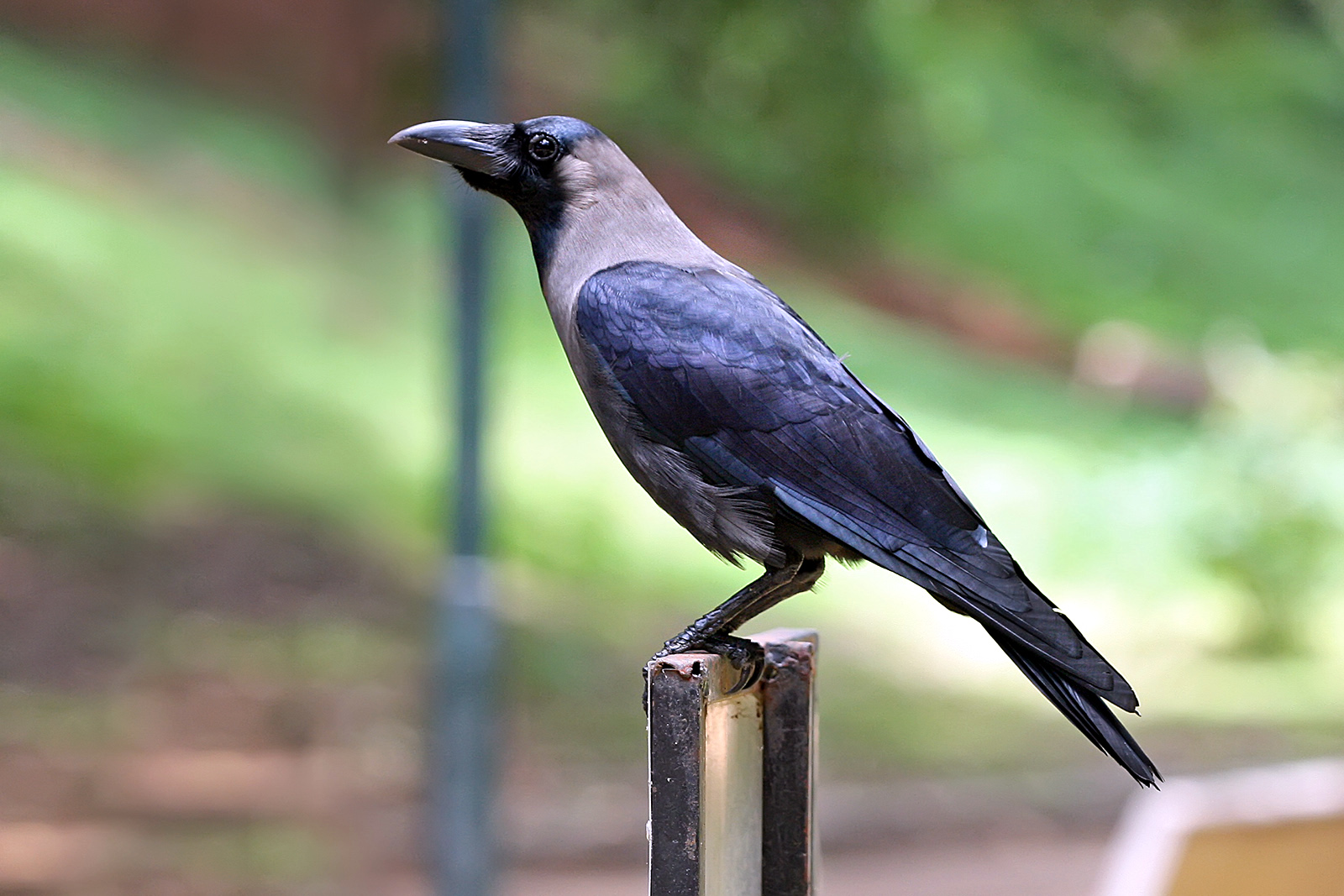
House crow (Corvus splendens), Bangalore, India

=== Communal roosting ===
Crows gather in large communal roosts numbering between 200 and tens of thousands of individuals during nonbreeding months, particularly in the winter. These gatherings tend to happen near large food sources such as garbage dumps and shopping centers.

=== Play ===
Countless incidents are recorded of corvids at play. Many behaviourists see play as an essential quality in intelligent animals.

=== Calls ===
Corvus brachyrhynchos call
Call of Corvus brachyrhynchos (American crow)

Crows and the other members of the genus make a wide variety of calls or vocalizations. Crows have also been observed to respond to calls of other species; presumably, this behavior is learned because it varies regionally. Crows' vocalizations are complex and poorly understood. Some of the many vocalizations that crows make are a "koww", usually echoed back and forth between birds, a series of "kowws" in discrete units, a long caw followed by a series of short caws (usually made when a bird takes off from a perch), an echo-like "eh-aw" sound, and more. These vocalizations vary by species, and within each species they vary regionally. In many species, the pattern and number of the numerous vocalizations have been observed to change in response to events in the surroundings (e.g. arrival or departure of crows).

=== Foraging ===
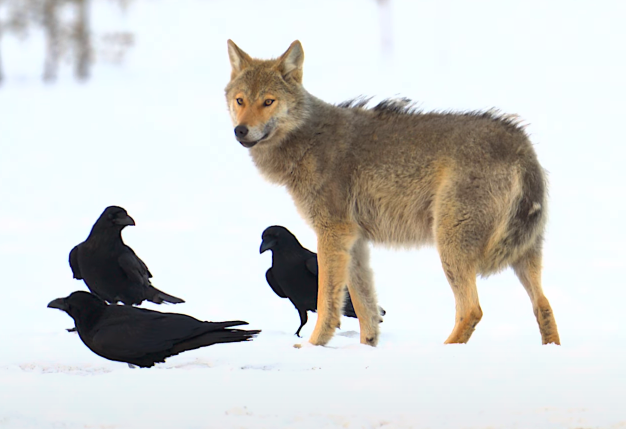
Wolf and ravens associating

Along with other birds, ravens have been known to associate with other animals such as coyotes and wolves. These associations are linked to feeding and hunting. Ravens use their calls to notify these animals when an injured prey is near. This interaction is most noticeable in winter where ravens are associated with wolf packs nearly 100% of the time. As a result of this connection, studies have been conducted on the reaction of prey animals to the call of the raven. In areas where ravens associate with predators, prey animals are more likely to avoid predation by leaving after hearing the call. Crows are also capable of distinguishing between coyotes and wolves and have shown a preference for wolves. This may be due to the fact that wolves kill larger prey. Crows also frequently mob owls, especially great horned owls, which are significant predators of corvids. This behavior involves loud calling and repeated dive-bombing to drive the owl out of the area and reduce danger to nests and fledglings. When hunting, ravens can locate injured animals, like elk, and can call out to wolves to kill them. At times, ravens associate with wolves even when there is no carcass and can even be seen forming relationships with them. This includes playing with cubs by using sticks, picking at their tails, or flying around them.

Audio clip of the call of a common raven from the Yellowstone sound library

Ravens have been mostly seen among travelling wolf packs rather than resting wolves, possibly due to the increased likelihood of food. They are also known to trust wolves in the pack they follow; when encountering a carcass killed by animals other than wolves, they are more apprehensive to eat from it. This symbiotic relationship between ravens and wolves is shown to be mutualistic; ravens help wolves find prey and when the wolves kill them the ravens can eat too. However, this relationship is not without its faults. Ravens may sometimes eat more of the prey than the wolf does. This problem has also been linked to wolf pack size, with some researchers suggesting that one of the reasons wolves hunt in larger packs is so that ravens (and other scavengers) get less of the food. Along with contention in wolves, ravens can also bother each other. By feeding off of the same carcass it is possible that some ravens will steal from their conspecifics. This behaviour is related to the ravens' ability to make quick decisions about eating the food then or storing it for later, and to their dominance and fighting ability.

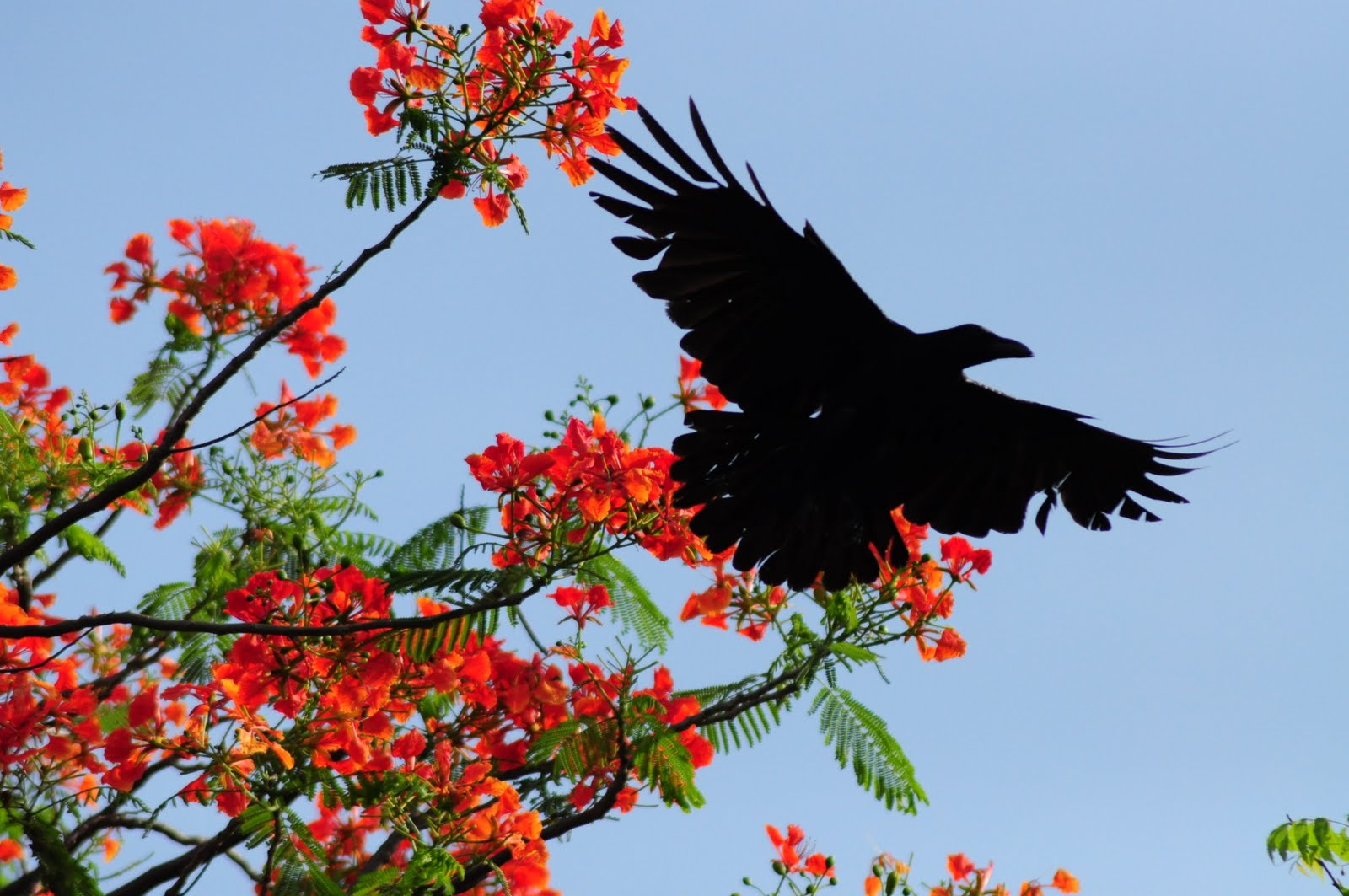
Indian crow in Tamil Nadu

=== Intelligence ===
As a group, crows show remarkable examples of intelligence. Natural history books from the 18th century recount an often-repeated, but unproven anecdote of "counting crows"—specifically a crow whose ability to count to five (or four in some versions) is established through a logic trap set by a farmer. Crows and ravens often score very highly on intelligence tests. Certain species top the avian IQ scale. Wild hooded crows in Israel have learned to use bread crumbs for bait-fishing. Crows engage in a kind of midair jousting, or air "chicken" to establish pecking order. They have been found to engage in activities such as sports, tool use, the ability to hide and store food across seasons, episodic-like memory, and the ability to use individual experience in predicting the behavior of proximal conspecifics.

One species, the New Caledonian crow, has also been intensively studied recently because of its ability to manufacture and use tools in the day-to-day search for food. On 5 October 2007, researchers from the University of Oxford presented data acquired by mounting tiny video cameras on the tails of New Caledonian crows. They pluck, smooth, and bend twigs and grass stems to procure a variety of foodstuffs. Crows in Queensland have learned how to eat the toxic cane toad by flipping the cane toad on its back and stabbing the throat where the skin is thinner, allowing the crow to access the nontoxic innards; their long beaks ensure that all of the innards can be removed.

The western jackdaw and the Eurasian magpie have been found to have a nidopallium about the same relative size as the functionally equivalent neocortex in chimpanzees and humans, and significantly larger than is found in the gibbons. Research has shown that corvids possess unusually high neuron density in their forebrains, which contributes to cognitive abilities comparable to those of some primates.

Crows have demonstrated the ability to distinguish individual humans by recognizing facial features. A neuroimaging study demonstrated that crows recognize individual human faces and activate brain regions associated with perception, attention, and fear when viewing threatening individuals. Evidence also suggests they are one of the few nonhuman animals, along with insects like bees or ants, capable of displacement (communication about things that are not immediately present, spatially or temporally).

In the Gumyoji Park of Yokohama, Japan, crows have shown the ability to both activate public drinking fountains and adjust the water flow to appropriate levels for either bathing or drinking.

Many studies have been conducted to research the ways in which ravens and corvids learn. Some have concluded that the brains of ravens and crows compare in relative size to great apes. The encephalization quotient (EQ) helps to expose the similarities between a great ape brain and a crow/raven brain. This includes cognitive ability. Though the brains differ significantly between mammals and birds, larger forebrains are seen in corvids compared to other birds (except some parrots), especially in areas associated with social learning, planning, decision making in humans and complex cognition in apes. Along with tool use, ravens can recognize themselves in a mirror. This complex cognition can also be extended to socio-cognitive abilities. Studies have been conducted regarding the development and evolution of social abilities in ravens. These results help to show how ravens prefer to form stable relationships with siblings and close social partners as opposed to strangers. The development in social abilities is essential for raven survival, including identifying whether something poses a threat and how ravens alert others nearby of an incoming threat.

Their ability to show appreciation and develop relationships with humans is best exemplified in the story of a young girl from Seattle, Washington named Gabi Mann. Gabi leaves out treats for the crows in. her yard: sandwich crumbs, chicken nuggets, peanuts. In gratitude, the crows bring her bric-a-brac gifts: a chapstick tube, a rusty screw, as well as more glittery objects, such as polished sea glass. They even found a lens cap from her camera, and returned it to her.

== Diet ==
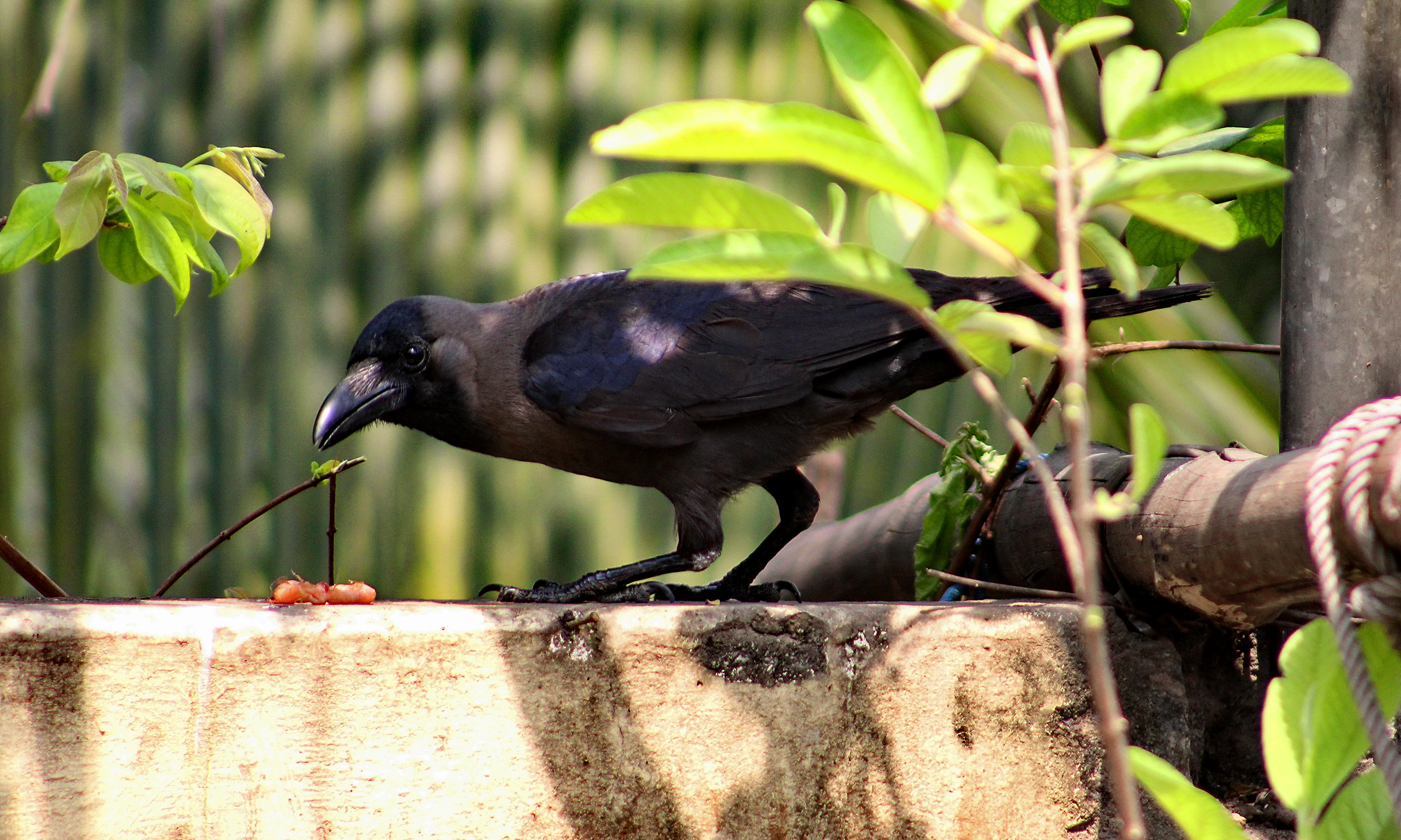
Corvus splendens or house crow resting in shadows on a rooftop eating refuse from a slaughterhouse

Crows are omnivorous and their diets are very diverse. They eat almost any food, including other birds, fruits, nuts, mollusks, earthworms, seeds, frogs, eggs, nestlings, mice, and carrion. The origin of placing scarecrows in grain fields resulted from the crows' incessant damaging and scavenging, although crows also assist farmers by eating insects otherwise attracted to their crops.

== Reproduction ==
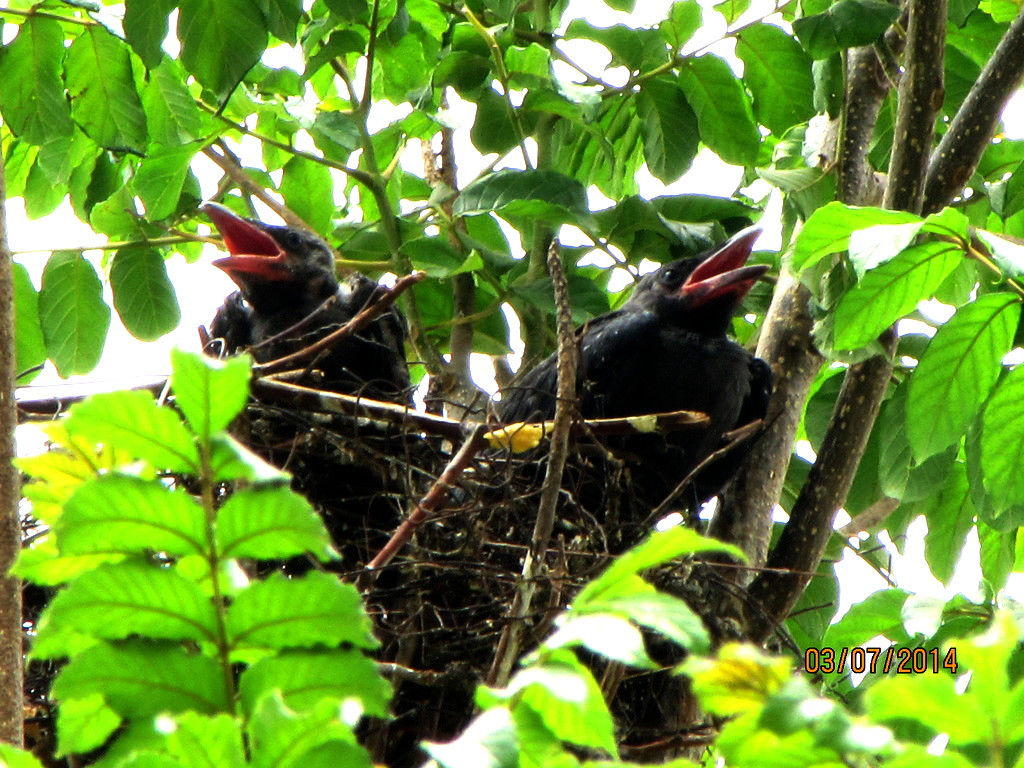
Nestlings, almost ready to fledge

Crows reach sexual maturity around the age of three years for females and five years for males. Clutch size is around three to nine eggs, and the nesting period lasts between 20 and 40 days. While crows typically mate for life, extra-pair copulation is not unusual, and young from previous years often help nesting pairs protect a nest and feed nestlings.

Many crow species form long-term monogamous pair bonds, and juveniles may remain with their parents for multiple years to help raise subsequent broods.

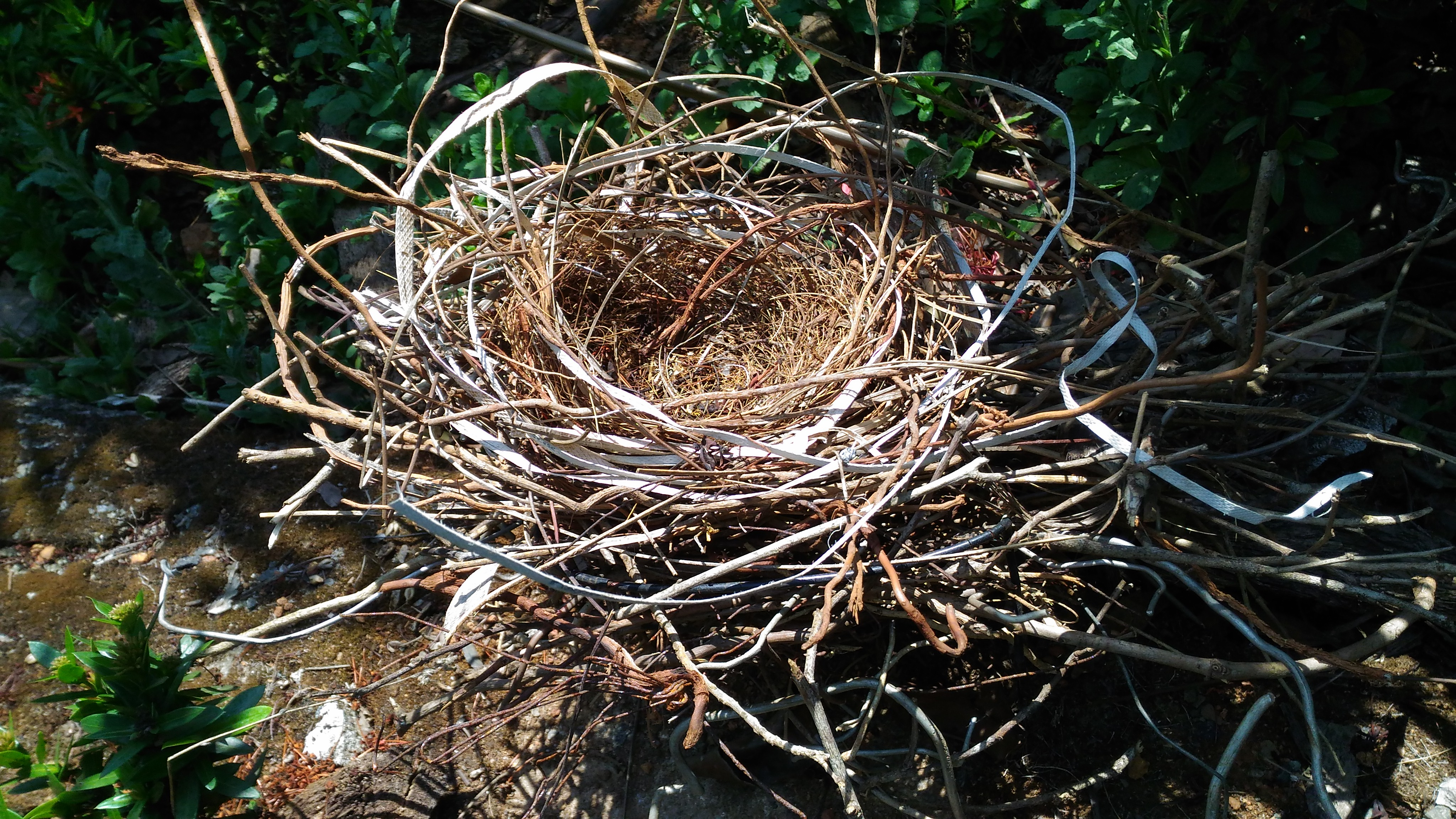
A crow's nest is made of materials such as twigs, electrical wire, metal strips, plastic pieces, and other small items.

Crow nestlings in urban areas face threats such as nest entanglement from anthropogenic nesting materials and stunted growth due to poor nutrition.

== Lifespan and disease ==
Some crows may live to the age of 20, and the oldest known American crow in the wild was almost 30 years old. The oldest documented captive crow died at age 59. The American crow is highly susceptible to the recently introduced North American strain of West Nile virus. American crows typically die within one week of acquiring the disease and very few survive exposure.

== Conservation status ==
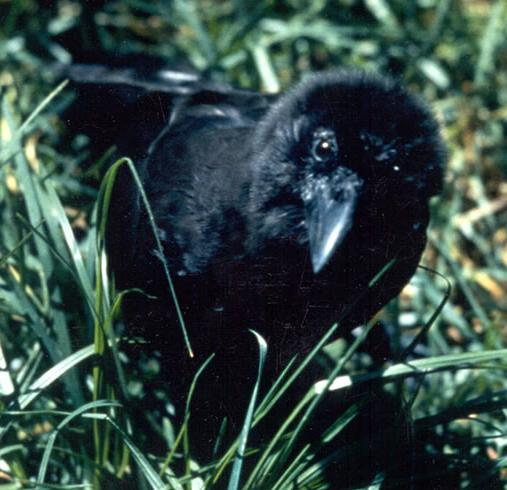
The Hawaiian crow or 'alala (Corvus hawaiiensis) is nearly extinct; only a few dozen birds survive in captivity. It is listed as "extinct in the wild" by the United States Fish and Wildlife Service.

Two species of crows have been listed as endangered by the U.S. Fish and Wildlife Service—the Hawaiian crow and the Mariana crow. The American crow, despite having its population reduced by 45% since 1999 by the West Nile virus, is considered a species of least concern.

== Problems and methods of control ==
Intelligence and social structures make most crow species adaptable and opportunistic. Crows frequently cause damage to crops and property, strew trash, and transfer disease. In densely populated areas around the world, corvids are generally regarded as nuisance animals. Crows are protected in the U.S. under the federal Migratory Bird Treaty Act of 1918, but because of their perceived destructive nature, control of the species is allowed in certain areas. Because of their intelligence, control is often difficult or expensive. Methods for control include hunting, chemical immobilization, harassment and scare tactics, and trapping. Before any measure is used to confine, trap, kill, poison, immobilize, or alter the habits of any wild bird species, a person must check local, state, and federal regulations pertaining to such actions.

=== Hunting ===
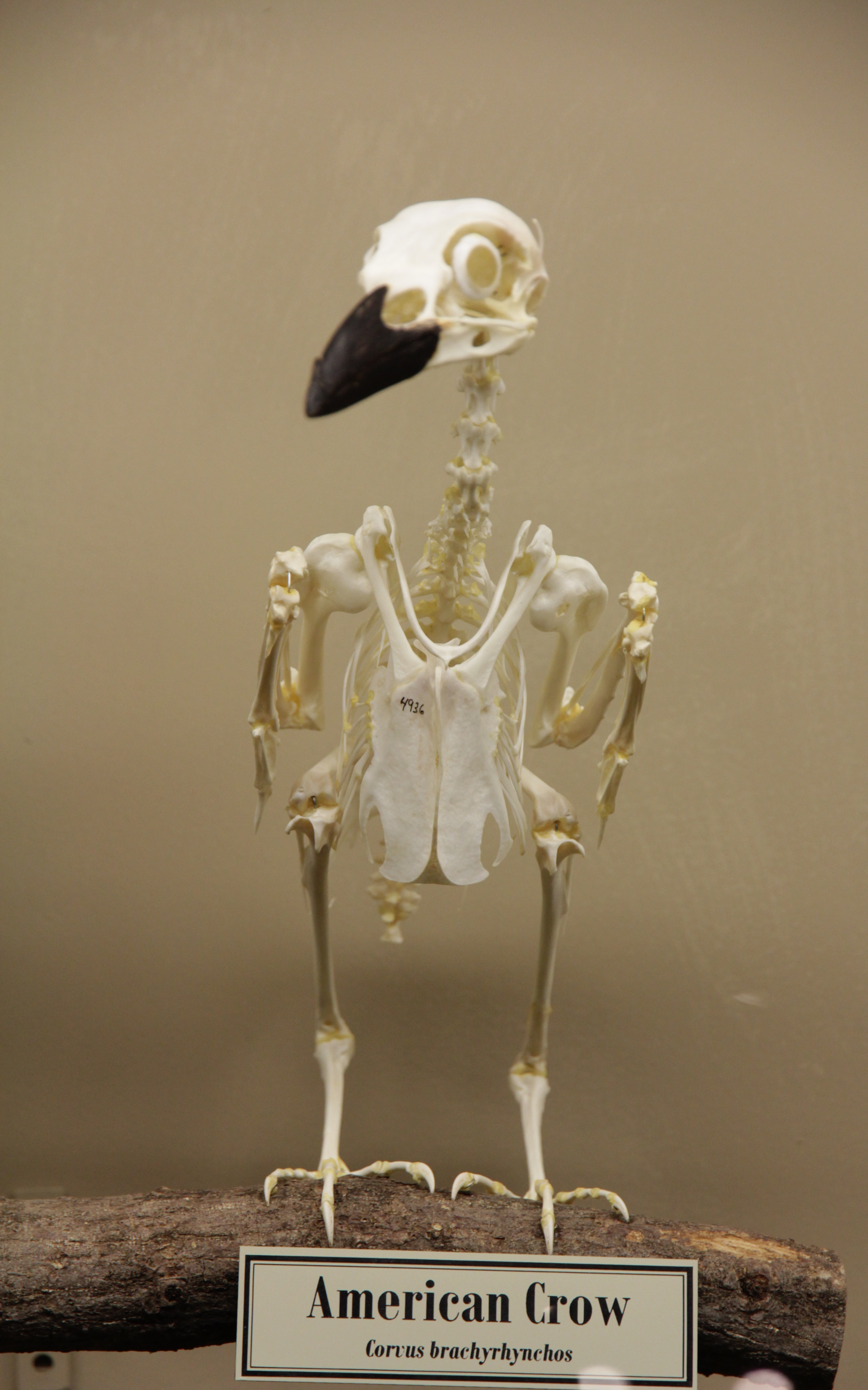
Skeleton of American crow (Corvus brachyrhychos) on display at the Museum of Osteology

In the United States, hunting is allowed under state and federal regulation. Crow hunting is considered a sport in rural areas of the U.S. because the birds are not considered a traditional edible game species. Some cultures do treat various corvid species as a food source. Liability and possible danger to persons and property limit the use of hunting or shooting as control methods in urban areas. Crows' wariness and cunning make harvesting crows in sufficient numbers difficult.

=== Scare tactics ===
Scare tactics have been the most widely used aversion tactic for crows in areas frequented by humans and domestic animal species. This safe method does not require constant maintenance or manpower to operate or monitor. However, corvids quickly become habituated to most tactics such as blast cannons, predator decoys, and traditional scarecrows. Greater success has been achieved by adding sound and motion to predator decoys to mimic a distressed crow being caught by a predator such as an owl or hawk. Work is currently being done which uses multiple aversion techniques in one area. The theory is that multiple techniques used together will confuse the crows, thereby lessening the probability of habituation to stimuli.

=== Trapping ===
Trapping is a rarely used technique in the U.S., but is being used with success in parts of Europe and Australia. The ladder-style trap (e.g., Australian Crow Trap or Modified Australian Crow Trap) seems to be the most effective in crow-trapping techniques. Ladder traps are constructed in such a way that unintentional catch of nontarget species is avoided. If a nontarget species is caught, it can be easily released without harm to the bird. The traps are cost-efficient because they are inexpensive and simple to construct, and require little manpower to monitor. The bait used in the traps can also be specific to corvids. Carrion, grains, unshelled raw peanuts, and shiny objects in the trap are effective baits. When removing crows from a ladder trap, one living crow is left as an effective decoy for other crows. Trapping is considered the most humane method for crow removal because the crows can be relocated without harm or stress. However, most wild birds in general have a knack for returning to their home ranges.

=== Other methods ===
Other methods have been used with little or limited success. Lasers have been used successfully to remove large flocks of birds from roost structures in urban areas, but success in keeping crows off roosts has been short-lived. Homeowners can reduce the presence of crows by keeping trash stored in containers, feeding pets indoors, and hanging tin pie-pans or reflective gazing globes around garden areas.

== As food ==
Crows were hunted for survival by Curonians, a Baltic tribe, when common food was exhausted and the landscape changed so that farming was not as productive during the 18th and 19th centuries. Fishermen supplemented their diet by gathering coastal bird eggs and preserving crow meat by salting and smoking it. It became a traditional food for poor folk and is documented in a poem, "The Seasons", by Kristijonas Donelaitis. After the nonhunting policy was lifted by the Prussian government in 1721–1724 and alternative food supplies increased, the practice was forgotten. The tradition re-emerged after World War I; in marketplaces, butchered crows that were sought after and bought by townsfolk were common. The hunted crows were not the local, but the migrating ones; each year during the spring and autumn, crows migrated via the Curonian Spit between Finland and the rest of Europe. In 1943, the government even issued a hunting quota for such activities. Crows were usually caught by attracting them with smoked fish or grains soaked in spirits and then collecting them with nets. It was a job for the elderly or young who were unable to go to sea to fish, and it was common to catch 150 to 200 birds during a hunting day.

== Human interaction ==
The common raven and carrion crow have been blamed for killing weak lambs and are often seen eating freshly dead corpses probably killed by other means. The Australian raven has been documented chasing, attacking, and seriously injuring lambs. Rooks have been blamed for eating grain in the UK and brown-necked ravens for raiding date crops in desert countries.

Crows have been shown to have the ability to visually recognize individual humans and to transmit information about "bad" humans by squawking. Crows appear to show appreciation to humans by presenting them with gifts. Studies indicate that crows remember dangerous human faces and can socially transmit this information to other crows within their group.

== Cultural depictions ==
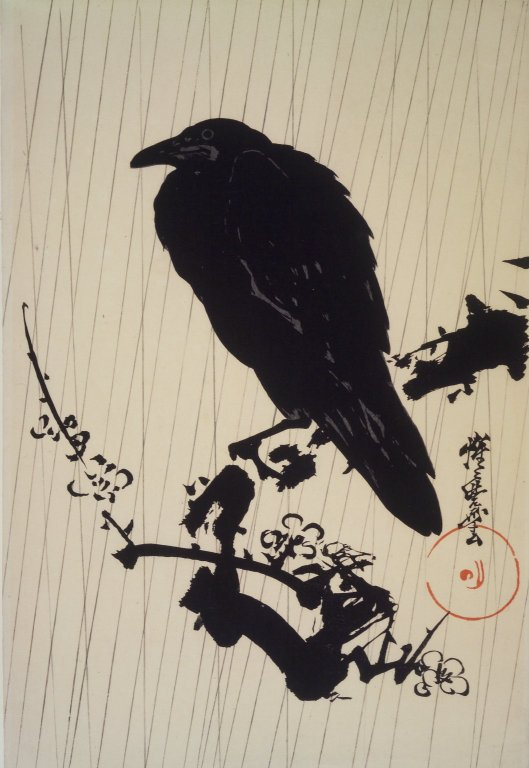
Crow on a Branch – Kawanabe Kyosai (1831–1889)

Crow pictured in the former coat of arms of Paattinen

=== In folklore and mythology ===
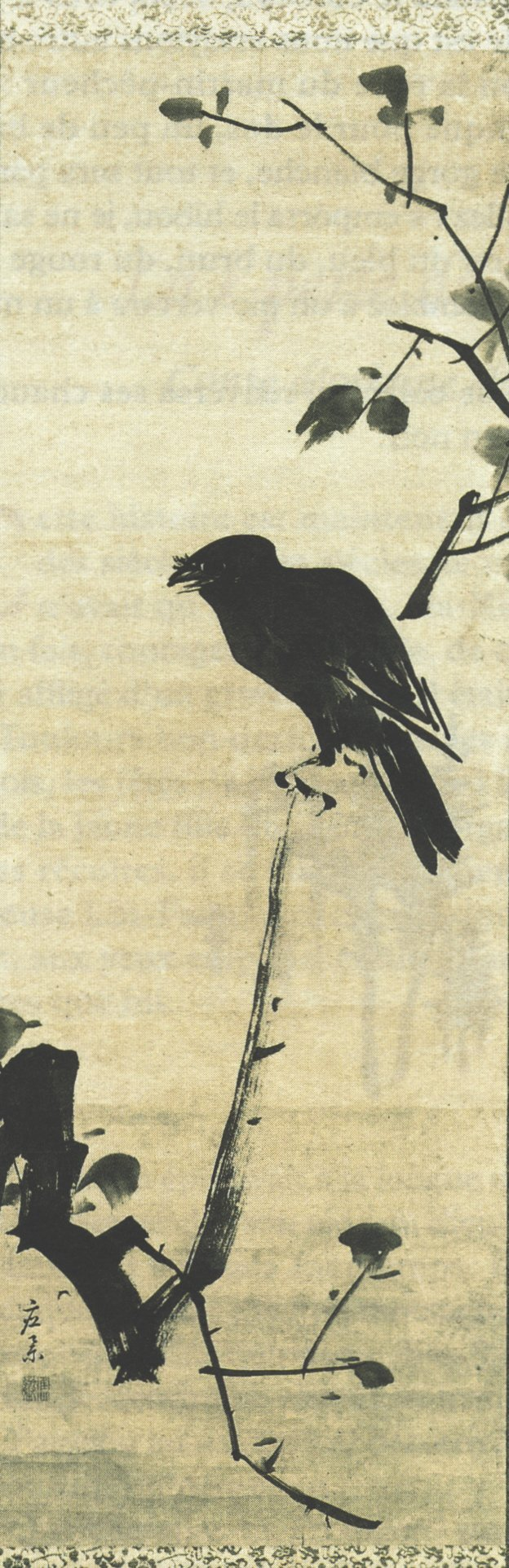
Crow on a Branch, Maruyama Ōkyo (1733–1795)

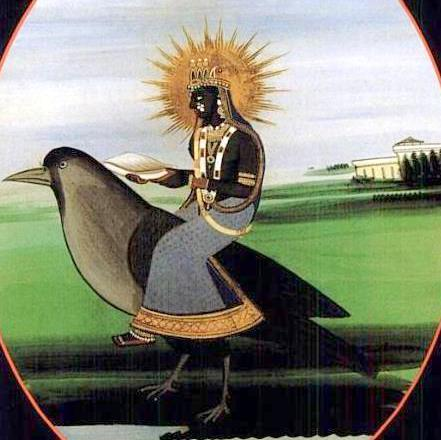
Dhumavati

In Ancient Greece and Rome, several myths about crows and jackdaws included:

- An ancient Greek and Roman adage, told by Erasmus runs, "The swans will sing when the jackdaws are silent," meaning that educated or wise people will speak after the foolish become quiet.
- The Roman poet Ovid saw the crow as a harbinger of rain (Amores 2,6, 34).
- Pliny noted how the Thessalians, Illyrians, and Lemnians cherished jackdaws for destroying grasshoppers' eggs. The Veneti are fabled to have bribed the jackdaws to spare their crops.
- Ancient Greek authors tell how a jackdaw, being a social creature, may be caught with a dish of oil into which it falls while looking at its own reflection.
- In Greek legend, princess Arne was bribed with gold by King Minos of Crete and was punished for her avarice by being transformed into an equally avaricious jackdaw, which still seeks shiny things.

In the Bible account at 1 Kings 17:6, ravens are credited with providing Elijah with food.

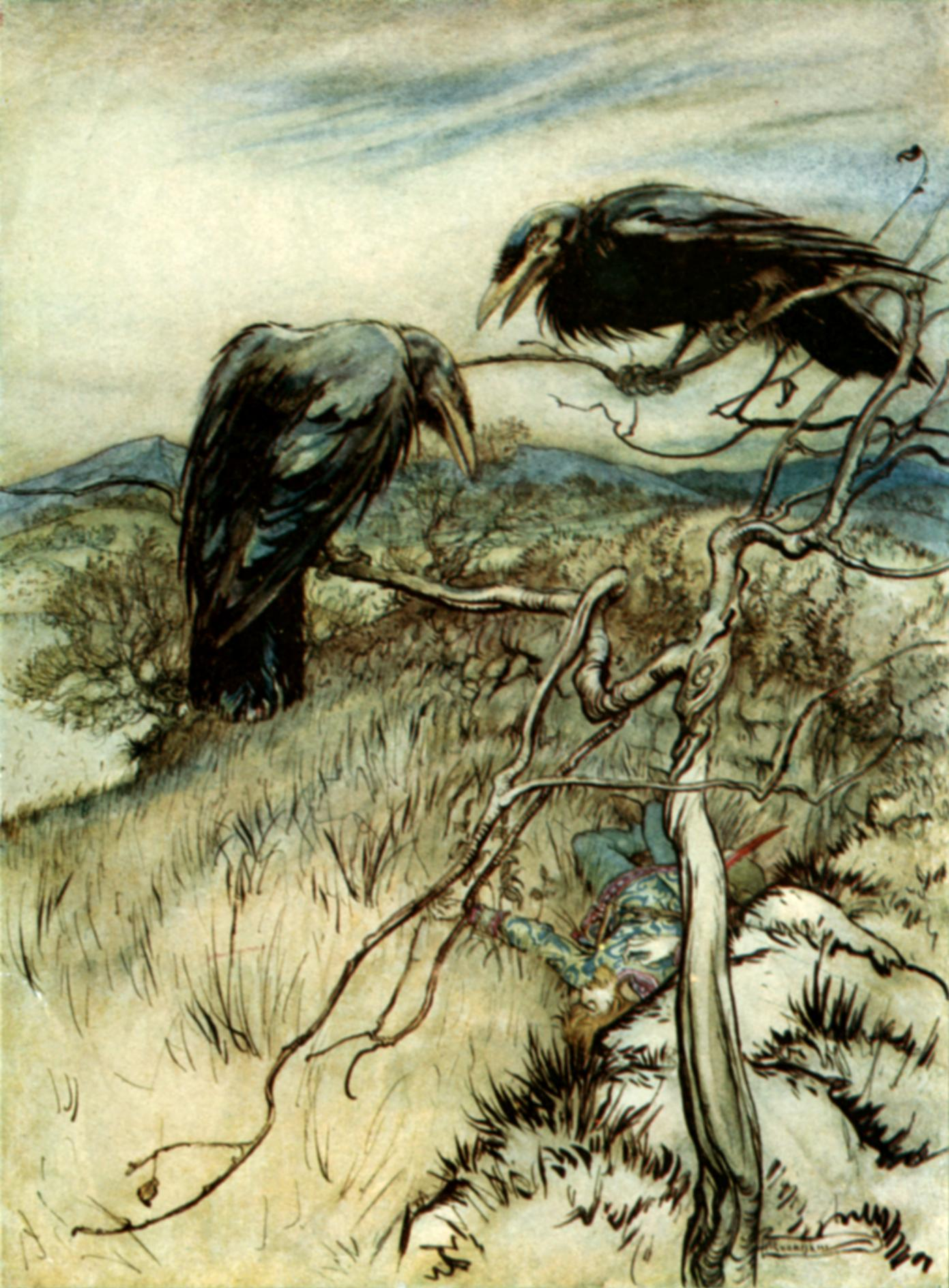
The Twa Corbies by Arthur Rackham

In Australian Aboriginal mythology, Crow is a trickster, culture hero, and ancestral being. Legends relating to Crow have been observed in various Aboriginal language groups and cultures across Australia; these commonly include stories relating to Crow's role in the theft of fire, the origin of death, and the killing of Eagle's son.

Crows are mentioned often in Buddhism, especially Tibetan disciplines. The Dharmapala (protector of the Dharma) Mahakala is represented by a crow in one of his physical/earthly forms.

In the Chaldean myth the Epic of Gilgamesh, Utnapishtim releases a dove and raven to find land; however, the dove merely circles and returns. Only then does Utnapishtim send forth the raven, which does not return, and Utnapishtim concludes the raven has found land.

In Chinese mythology, the world originally had 10 suns either spiritually embodied as 10 crows and/or carried by 10 crows; when all 10 decided to rise at once, the effect was devastating to crops, so the gods sent their greatest archer Houyi, who shot down nine crows and spared only one.

In Denmark, the night raven is considered an exorcised spirit. A hole in its left wing denotes where the stake used to exorcise it was driven into the earth. He who looks through the hole will become a night raven himself.

In Hinduism, crows are thought of as carriers of information that give omens to people regarding their situations. For example, when a crow crows in front of a person's house, the resident is expected to have special visitors that day. Also, in Hindu literature, crows have great memories which they use to give information. Symbolism is associated with the crow in the Hindu faith. On a positive note, crows are often associated with worship of ancestors because they are believed to be embodying the souls of the recently deceased. However, many other associations with crows are seen in Hinduism. Crows are believed to be connected with both the gods and goddesses, particularly the controversial ones such as Sani, the god of the planet Saturn, who uses a crow as his vehicle. In Hindu astrology, it is said that one who has the effect of Sani in their horoscope are angered easily, and may be unable to take control of their futures, but are extremely intelligent at the same time. Thus the presence of a crow, the vehicle of Sani is believed to have similar effects on the homes it lays its eyes on. Whether these effects are positive or negative is a source of debate in Hinduism. Crows are also considered ancestors in Hinduism and during Śrāddha, the practice of offering food or pinda to crows is still in vogue. Crows are associated with Dhumavati the form of mother goddess that invokes quarrel and fear. Crows are also fed during the fifteen day period of Pitru Paksha, which occurs in the autumn season, as an offering and sacrifice to the ancestors. During the time of Pitra Paksha, it is believed that the ancestors descend on Earth from pitra-loka, and are able to eat food offered to them by the means of a crow. This can also occur during the time of Kumbha, many Hindus prepare entire vegetarian meals that are eaten solely by the crows and other birds.

In Irish mythology, crows are associated with Morrigan, the goddess of war and death.

In Islam, the Surat Al-Ma'ida of the Qur'an describes the story of how the crow teaches the son of Adam to cover the dead body of his brother: "Then Allah sent a crow digging a grave in the ground for a dead crow, in order to show him how to bury the corpse of his brother. He cried, 'Alas! Have I even failed to be like this crow and bury the corpse of my brother?' So he became regretful."

In Japanese mythology, a three-legged crow called Yatagarasu (八咫烏; "eight-hand-crow") is depicted.

In Korean mythology, a three-legged crow is known as Samjokgo (hangul: 삼족오; hanja: 三足烏).

In Norse mythology, Huginn and Muninn are a pair of common ravens that range the entire world, Midgard, bringing the god Odin information.

In Sweden, ravens are held to be the ghosts of murdered men.

In Welsh mythology, the god Brân the Blessed—whose name means "crow" or "raven"—is associated with corvids and death; tradition holds that Bran's severed head is buried under the Tower of London, facing France—a possible genesis for the practice of keeping ravens in the Tower, said to protect the fortunes of Britain. In Cornish folklore, crows—magpies particularly—are associated with death and the "other world", and must be greeted respectfully. The origin of "counting crows" as augury is British; however, the British version rather is to "count magpies"—their black and white pied colouring alluding to the realms of the living and dead.

In some Native American mythologies, especially those in the Pacific Northwest, the raven is seen as both the Creator of the World and, separately, a trickster god.

According to Landnámabók, a mythological account on the discovery of Iceland, Hrafna-Flóki is supposed to have used three ravens to scout for land around 860–870 CE when he came across the island. Experts debate whether the account is historical or mythological.

In medieval times, crows were thought to live abnormally long lives. They were also thought to be monogamous throughout their long lives. They were thought to predict the future, anticipate rain and reveal ambushes. Crows were also thought to lead flocks of storks while they crossed the sea to Asia.

=== In popular culture ===
==== Literature ====
- The Raven by Edgar Allan Poe details a raven extensively being sent by a woman Lenore, followed by conflict between the raven and the narrator
- In Aesop's Fables, the jackdaw embodies stupidity in one tale (by starving while waiting for figs on a fig tree to ripen), vanity in another (the jackdaw sought to become king of the birds with borrowed feathers, but was shamed when they fell off), and cunning in yet another (the crow comes up to a pitcher and knows that his beak is too short to reach the water, and if he tips it over, all the water will fall out, so the crow places pebbles in the pitcher so the water rises and he can reach it to relieve his thirst).
- In Ovid's Metamorphoses, in Greek mythology, the god Apollo became enraged when the crow or raven exposed his lover Coronis' tryst with a mortal, his ire transmuting the bird's feathers from white to black.
- In the Story of Bhusunda, a chapter of the Yoga Vasistha, a very old sage in the form of a crow, Bhusunda, recalls a succession of epochs in the Earth's history, as described in Hindu cosmology. He survived several destructions, living on a wish-fulfilling tree on Mount Meru.
- The Crow, a comic book series by James O'Barr, adapted into multiple films: The Crow (1994 film) and The Crow (2024 film).

==== Organizations ====
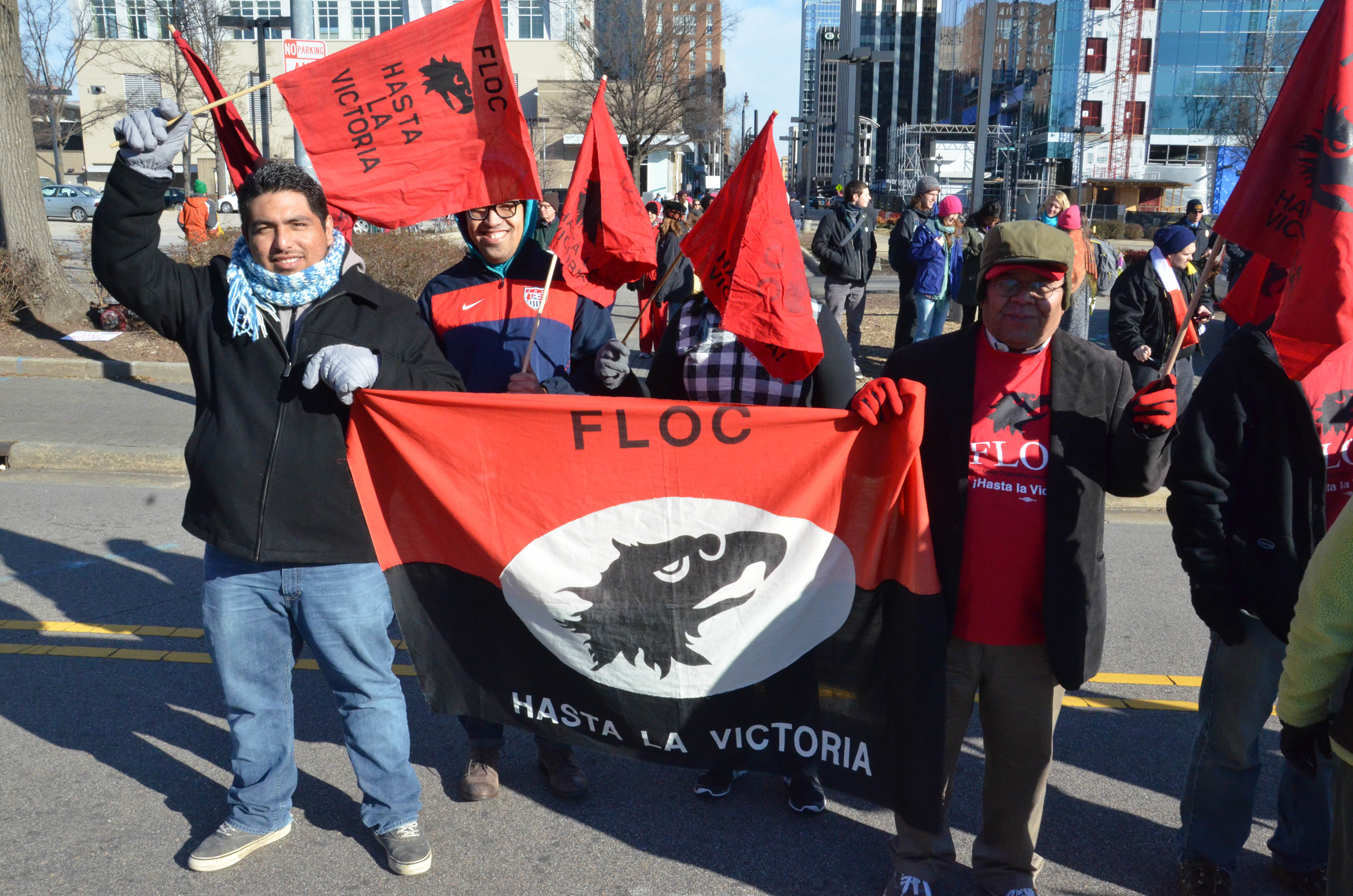
FLOC with raven logo

- The Farm Labor Organizing Committee uses a raven as its logo, with top red and bottom black colors for its logo

==== Music ====
- Both ravens and crows have commonly featured in the lyrics of heavy metal songs. A 2019 study showed that ravens are the most frequent birds mentioned in heavy metal lyrics, while crows are the fourth (eagles and vultures being the second and third).

== See also ==
- Corvus (heraldry)
- Eating crow
- Ischys for the Greek myth of why the raven's feathers are black
- Scarecrows
