= Gumyō-ji =

Buddhist temple in Yokohama, Japan

- 弘明寺
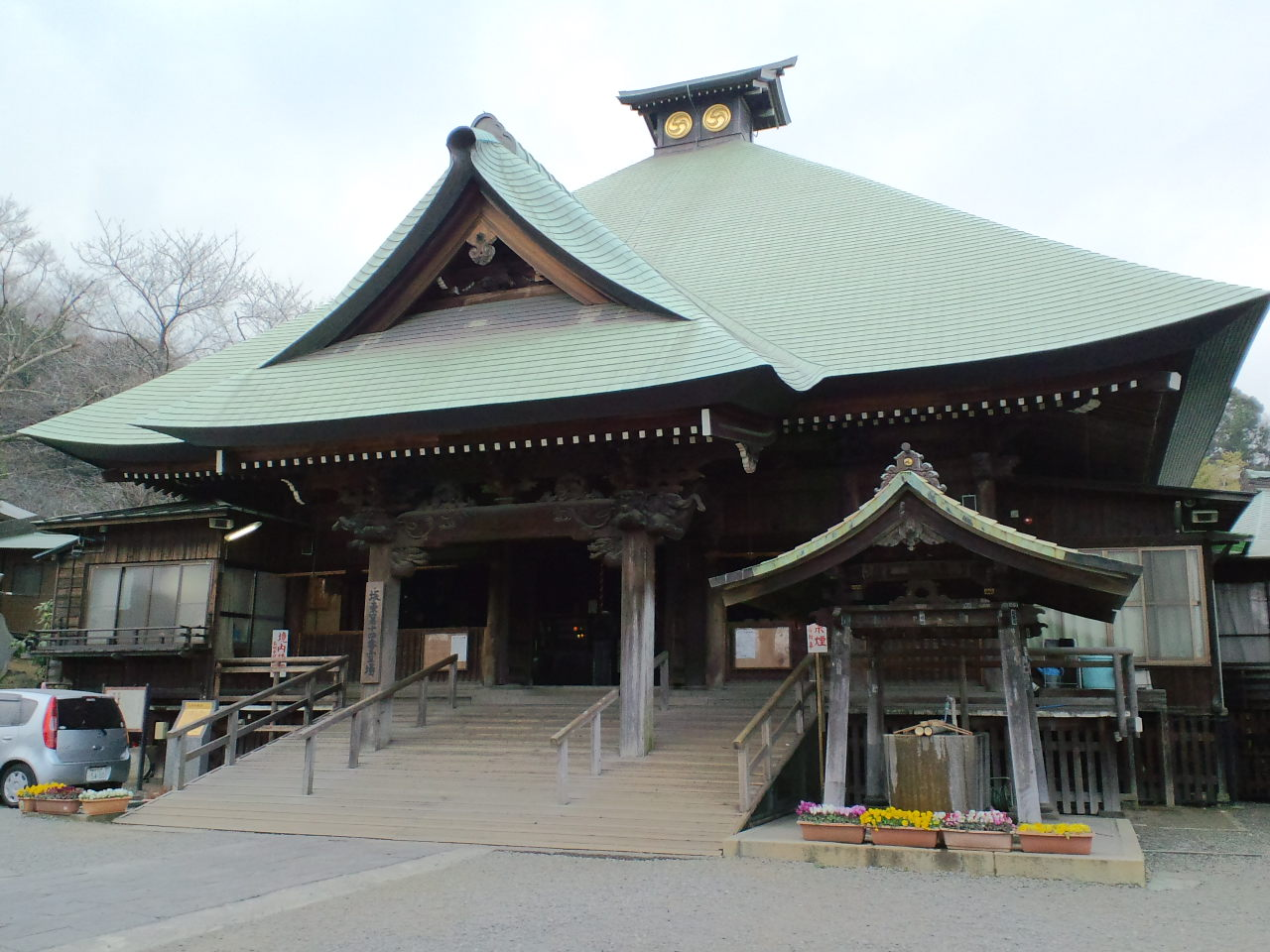
- Gumyō-ji Hondo

- Location within Kanagawa Prefecture Location within Japan

Religion
- Affiliation: Buddhist
- Deity: Jūichimen Kannon Bosatsu
- Rite: Kōyasan Shingon-shū
- Status: functional

Location
- Location: 267 Yamashita, Gumyoji-cho, Minami-ku, Yokohamashi, Kanagawa-ken
- Country: Japan
- Coordinates: 35°25′27″N 139°35′50.7″E

Architecture
- Founder: c.Gyōki
- Completed: c.806

Website
- Official website
- National Important Cultural Property }

Gumyō-ji (弘明寺) is a Buddhist temple located in Minami-ku, Yokohama, Japan. It belongs to the Kōyasan Shingon-shū sect and its honzon is a hibutsu statue of Jūichimen Kannon Bosatsu ( Sahasrabhūja). The temple's full name is Zuio-zan Renge-in Gunmyō-ji (瑞應山 蓮華院 弘明寺).The temple is the 14th stop on the Bandō Sanjūsankasho pilgrimage route. It is also called the "Gumyō Kannon".

== History ==
The circumstances surrounding the founding of Gumyō-ji are uncertain. According to the temple's legend, it was founded in 721 by the Indian monk Śubhakarasiṃha, who established a mystical barrier at this location. He was followed by the Japanese priest Gyōki, who installed a statue of Kannon Bosatsu in 737, and the by the priest Kūkai who added a statue of Kangiten in the Kōnin era (810–824) and who performed the goma fire ritual 1000 times on this site.

The temple was reconstructed in 1044, and the current honzon statue of Jūichimen Kannon is believed to date from this reconstruction. The temple claims that reclaimed wood from the 1044 construction has been reused in the beams, rafters and floorboards of the present-day structure.

According to the Azuma Kagami, during the Kamakura period, the temple was a favored place of prayer for the Minamoto clan. The name of the temple, which was originally written as "求明寺" was changed to "弘明寺" by taking one kanji from the Lotus Sutra with the same pronunciation around this time.

During the Sengoku period, the temple received estates, to enable its upkeep, from the warlord Hōjō Sōun, and the temple continued to be patronized by successive shoguns of the Tokugawa shogunate until the end of the Edo period. However, in the anti-Buddhist Haibutsu kishaku movement of the early Meiji government the temple lost its estates, most of its treasures and most of its ancient documentation, including the lineage of its succession of head priests. the temple fell abandoned in the mid-Meiji period and was revived in 1901.

== Images of the temple ==
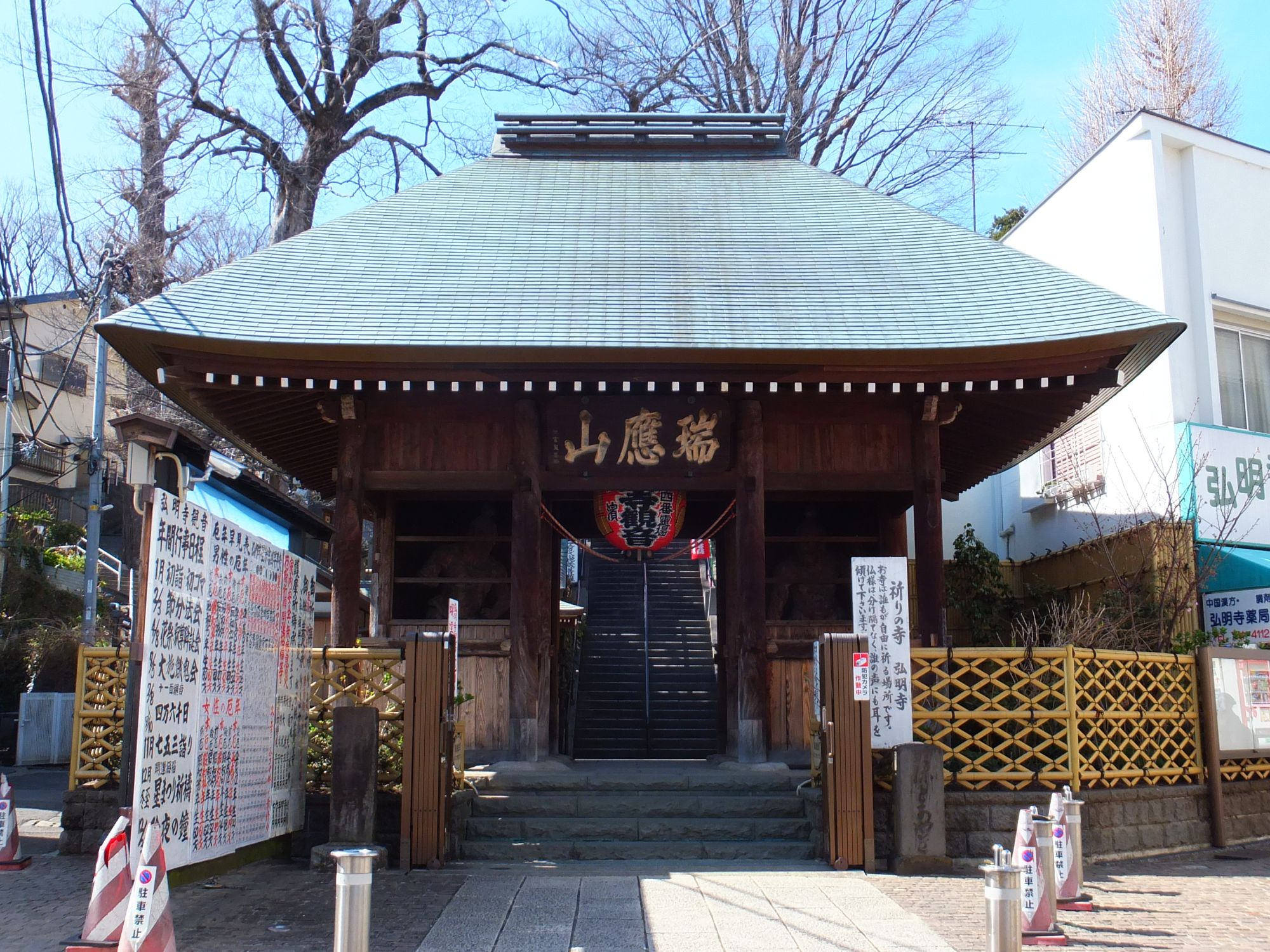
Nio-mon

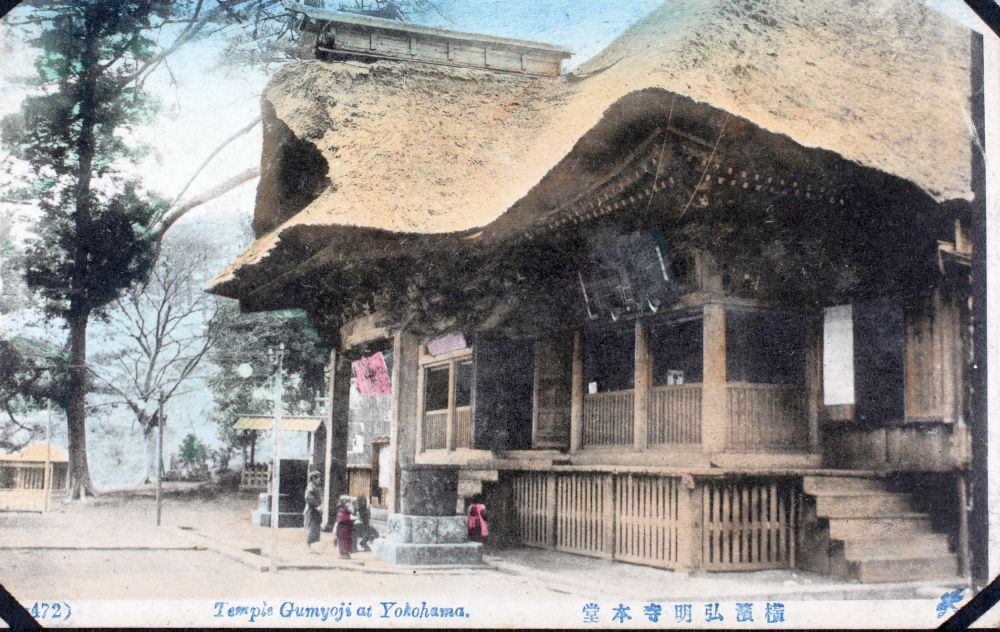
Main Hall in the Meiji period

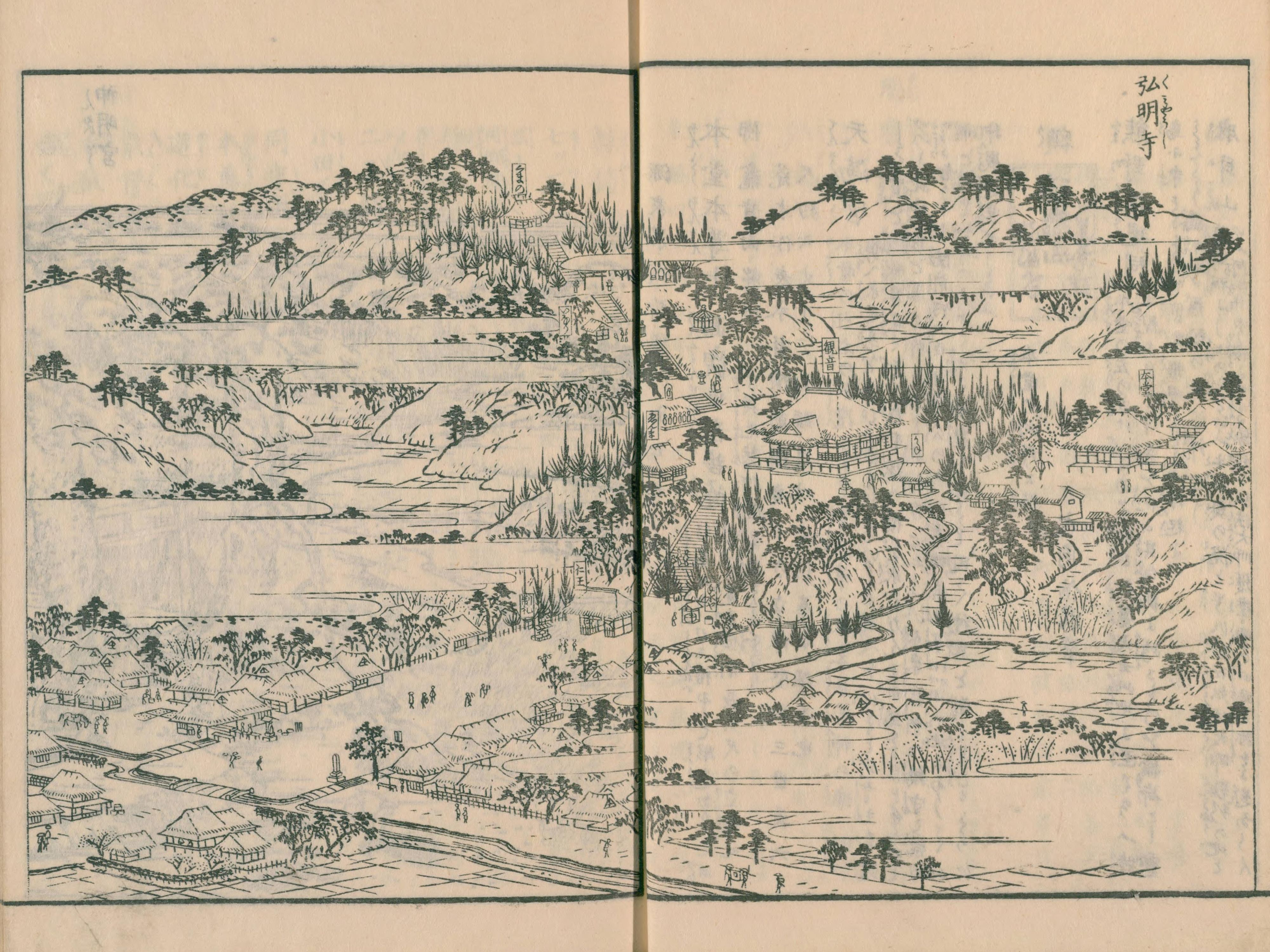
Illustration in the Edo period

== Gumyō Park ==
Gumyō Park, which was originally part of the shrine grounds, and the banks of the Ooka River, which runs through the center of Gumyoji Shopping Street, is now a noted cherry blossom viewing spot in Yokohama.

== Bandō Sanjūsankasho (Bandō 33 temple pilgrimage) ==
The temple is the 14th temple on the 33 temple Bandō Sanjūsankasho pilgrimage route.

== Access ==
The temple is located adjacent to Gumyōji Station (Keikyū Main Line).

== Cultural Properties ==
=== National Important Cultural Properties ===
- Jūichimen Kannon Bosatsu (木造十一面観世音菩薩立像, Jūichimen Kanzeon Bosatsu ritsuzō). The statue is made of a single piece of Japanese elm and is 181.7 cm tall. It is famous as a typical example of hatchet carving, and is believed to have been created in the middle of the Heian period.

== Yokohama City Tangible Cultural Properties ==
- Black lacquer vase (木造黒漆花瓶, Mokuzō kuroshitsu kabin ni-kuchi), set of 2, 70-cm tall, from zelkova wood, with an inscription of repair in 1590.
- Bell (梵鐘, Bonshō), dated 1798.
