= Minamiōta Station =

Railway station in Yokohama, Japan

KK41 Minamiōta Station 南太田駅
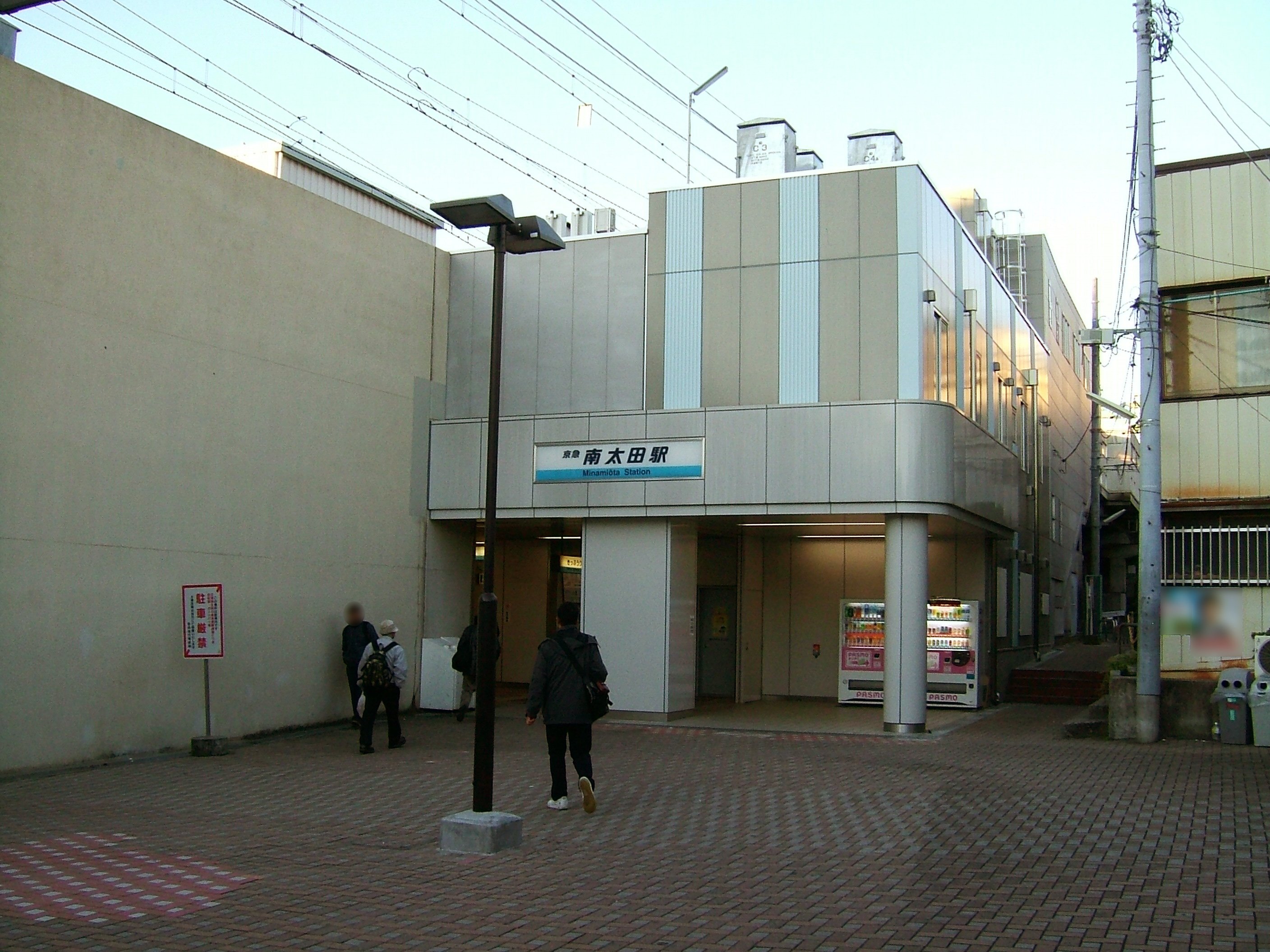
- North entrance of Minamiōta Station

General information
- Location: 1-chome, Minami-Ōta, Minami-ku, Yokohama-shi, Kanagawa-ken 232-0006; Japan
- Coordinates: 35°26′12.87″N 139°36′51.11″E
- Operator: Keikyū
- Line: Keikyū Main Line
- Distance: 26.5 km from Shinagawa
- Platforms: 2 side platforms
- Connections: Bus stop

Other information
- Station code: KK41
- Website: Official website

History
- Opened: April 1, 1930

Passengers
- 2019: 17,523 daily

Services
Preceding station	Keikyu	Following station
Idogaya KK42 towards Uraga	Main Line Local	Koganechō KK40 towards Shinagawa
Location
- Location within Kanagawa Prefecture Location within Japan

Minamiōta Station (南太田駅, Minami-Ōta-eki) is a passenger railway station located in Minami-ku, Yokohama, Kanagawa Prefecture, Japan, operated by the private railway company Keikyū.

== Lines ==
Minamiōta Station is served by the Keikyū Main Line and is located 26.5 kilometers from the terminus of the line at Shinagawa Station in Tokyo.

== Station layout ==
The station consists of two elevated opposed side platforms serving two tracks on passing loops to permit the through passage of express trains. The station buildings built underneath

=== Platforms ===
1	■ Keikyū Main Line	for Kamiōoka, Zushi·Hayama, Uraga
2	■ Keikyū Main Line	for Yokohama, Haneda Airport, Shinagawa, Sengakuji, Oshiage

== History ==
Minamiōta Station was opened on 1 April 1930.

Keikyū introduced station numbering to its stations on 21 October 2010; Minamiōta Station was assigned station number KK41.

== Passenger statistics ==
In fiscal 2019, the station was used by an average of 17,523 passengers daily.

The passenger figures for previous years are as shown below.

Fiscal year	daily average
2005	16,552
2010	17,276
2015	17,237

== Surrounding area ==
- Yokohama City Minamiota Elementary School
- Yokohama Commercial High School
- Kanagawa Prefectural Yokohama Seiryo General High School
- Yokohama Minamiota Post Office

== See also ==
- List of railway stations in Japan
