= Koganechō Station =

Railway station in Yokohama, Japan

KK40 Koganechō Station 黄金町駅
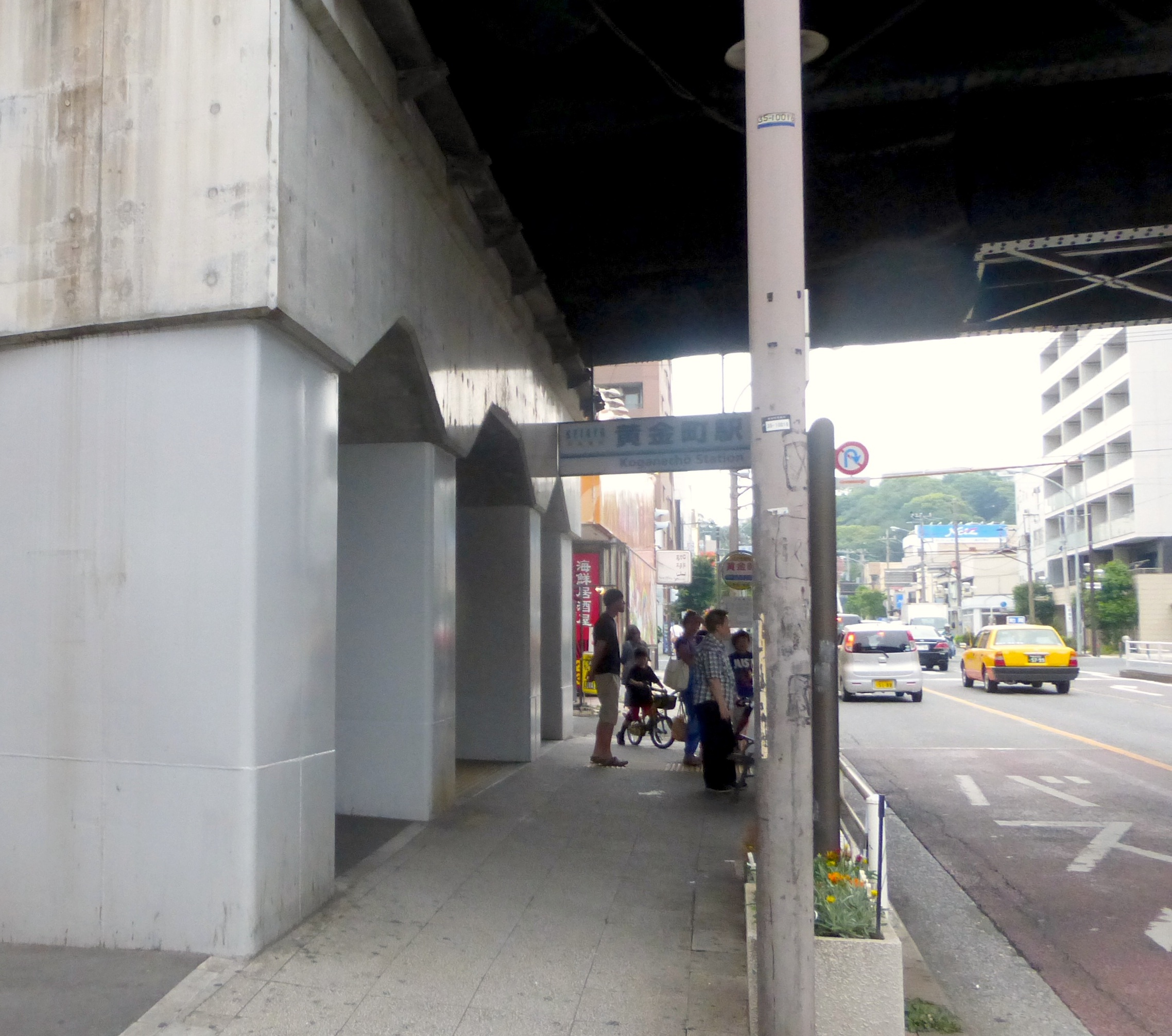
- Koganechō Station, 2015

General information
- Location: 1-chome, Shiroganechō, Minami-ku, Yokohama-shi, Kanagawa-ken 232 -0005; Japan
- Coordinates: 35.4396°N 139.6227°E
- Operator: Keikyū
- Line: Keikyū Main Line
- Distance: 25.6 km from Shinagawa
- Platforms: 1 island platform
- Connections: Bus stop

Other information
- Station code: KK40
- Website: Official website

History
- Opened: April 1, 1930

Passengers
- 2019: 22,987 daily

Services
Preceding station	Keikyu	Following station
Minamiōta KK41 towards Uraga	Main Line Local	Hinodechō KK39 towards Shinagawa
Location
- Location within Kanagawa Prefecture Location within Japan

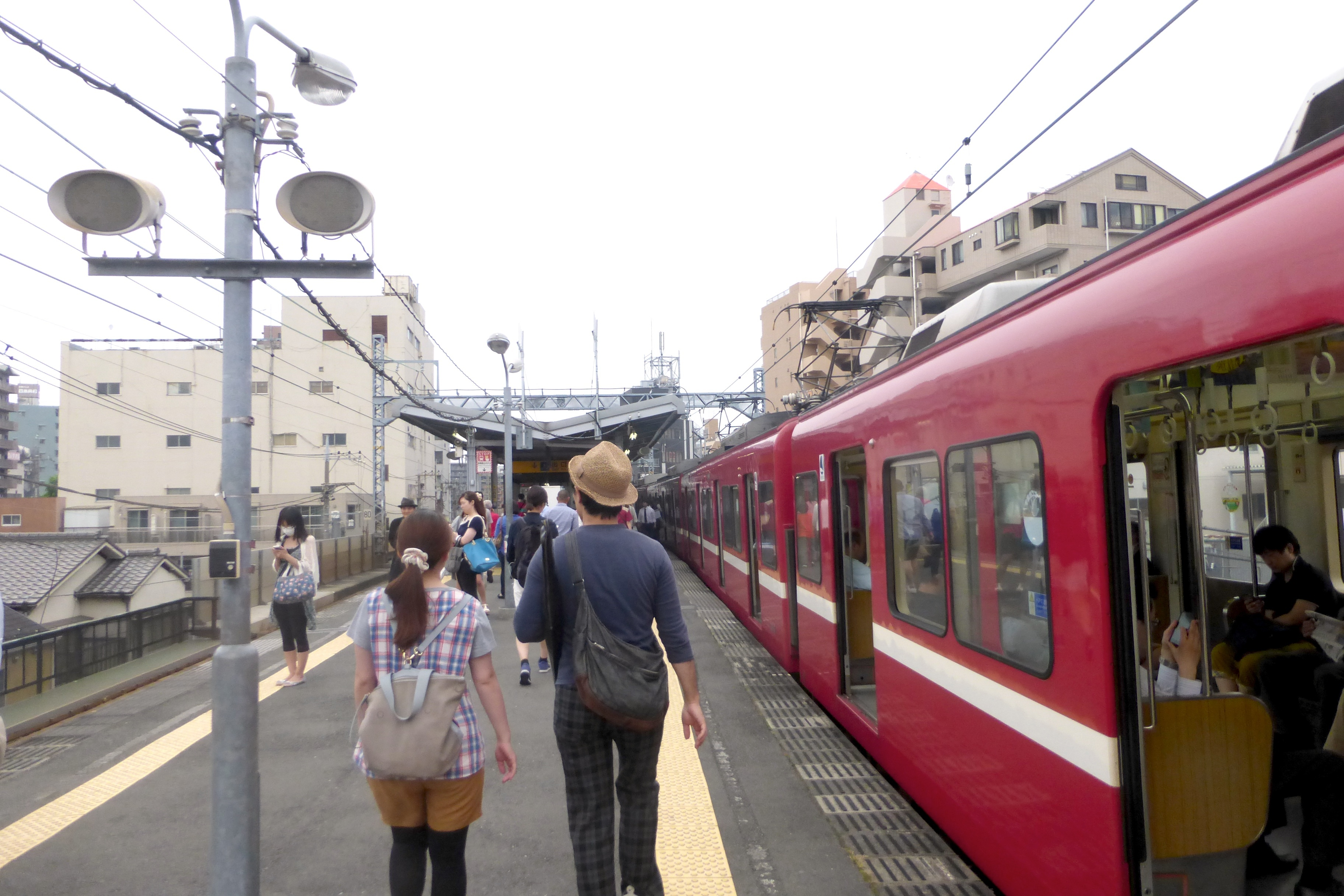
Station platforms, June 2015

Koganechō Station (黄金町駅, Koganechō-eki) is a passenger railway station located in Minami-ku, Yokohama, Kanagawa Prefecture, Japan, operated by the private railway company Keikyū.

== Lines ==
Koganechō Station is served by the Keikyū Main Line and is located 25.6 kilometers from the terminus of the line at Shinagawa Station in Tokyo.

== Station layout ==
The station consists of one elevated island platform with the station building built underneath.

=== Platforms ===
1	■ Keikyū Main Line	for Kamiōoka, Zushi·Hayama, Uraga
2	■ Keikyū Main Line	for Yokohama, Haneda Airport, Shinagawa, Sengakuji, Oshiage

== History ==
Koganechō Station was opened on April 1, 1930.

Keikyū introduced station numbering to its stations on 21 October 2010; Koganechō Station was assigned station number KK40.

== Passenger statistics ==
In fiscal 2019, the station was used by an average of 22,987 passengers daily.

The passenger figures for previous years are as shown below.

Fiscal year	daily average
2005	22,687
2010	23,106
2015	22,035

== Surrounding area ==
- Ooka River
- Japan National Route 16
- Kanto Gakuin Junior and Senior High School
- Kanto Gakuin Elementary School

== See also ==
- List of railway stations in Japan
