= Minami-ku, Yokohama =

Minami 南区
- Ward
- Minami Ward
- Flag

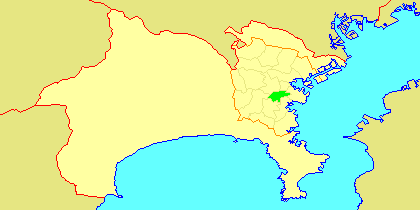
- Location of Minami in Kanagawa
- Interactive map of Minami
- Minami (Japan)
- Coordinates: 35°25′53″N 139°36′32″E
- Country: Japan
- Region: Kantō
- Prefecture: Kanagawa
- City: Yokohama

Area
  - Total: 12.67 km^{2} (4.89 sq mi)

Population (February 2010)
  - Total: 197,019
  - Density: 15,500/km^{2} (40,000/sq mi)
- Time zone: UTC+9 (Japan Standard Time)
- Flower: Sakura
- Address: 3-48-1 Hananoki-chō, Minami-ku Yokohama-shi, Kanagawa-ken; 232-0018
- Website: Minami Ward Office

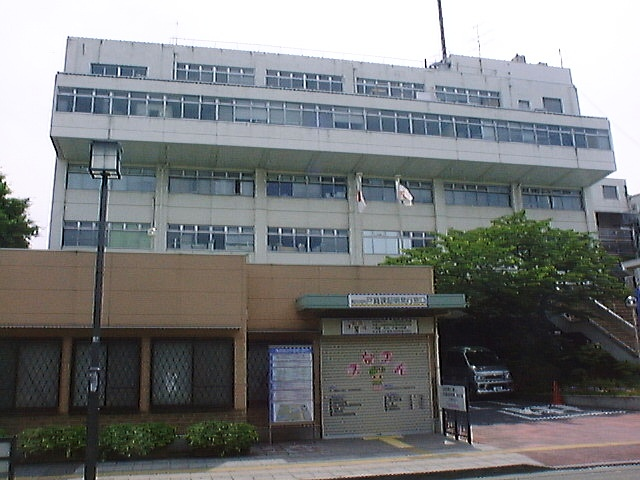
Minami Ward Office

Minami-ku (南区) is one of the 18 wards of the city of Yokohama in Kanagawa Prefecture, Japan. As of 2010, the ward had an estimated population of 197,019 and a density of 15,550 persons per km^{2}. The total area was 12.67 km^{2}.

It is located in the southeastern part of the city and has a mix of busy areas near train stations and quiet residential neighborhoods. The ward is crossed by the Ōoka River, and its riverside is popular among tourists and locals for cherry blossoms in the spring.

Minami Ward is home to Gumyō-ji, the oldest Buddhist temple in Yokohama.

== Geography ==
Minami Ward is located in eastern Kanagawa Prefecture, and south of the geographic center of the city of Yokohama. Large buildings and apartment complexes are built up along the area surrounding the highways and railways in the Ward; and all other parts of the Ward are residential areas. The Ōoka River is the major river in the Ward, and in spring many cherry blossoms come into full bloom on its banks. Gumyō-ji, located in the southern part of the ward, is the oldest Buddhist temple in Yokohama.

=== Surrounding municipalities ===
- Hodogaya Ward
- Nishi Ward
- Isogo Ward
- Naka Ward
- Totsuka Ward
- Konan Ward

== History ==
Part of the domains of the Miura clan during and after the Kamakura period, the area of present-day Minami Ward was part of the tenryō territory in Musashi Province controlled directly by the Tokugawa shogunate, but administered through various hatamoto. During the Bakumatsu period, the area was the site of the 1863 Idogaya Incident in which anti-foreign rōnin assassinated a soldier of the French mission in Yokohama, precipitating a diplomatic incident.

After the Meiji Restoration, the area was transferred to the new Kuraki District of Kanagawa Prefecture, and divided into numerous villages. The area was absorbed into the growing city of Yokohama in four phases: 1895, 1901, 1905 and 1927. On October 1, 1927, what is now Minami Ward became part of Naka Ward within Yokohama. On December 1, 1943, Naka Ward was divided into present-day Naka Ward and Minami Ward. In a major administrative reorganization of October 1, 1969, Minami Ward was further divided into the present-day Minami Ward and Kōnan Ward.

Koganecho, an area known since World War II for black marketing and brothels, was located along the Ōoka River in the ward. In preparation for Yokohama's 2009 150th anniversary celebrations of opening up as a port, police chased away the prostitutes from the area starting in 2005. Since then, the area has undergone redevelopment.

== Economy ==
Minami Ward is largely a regional commercial center and bedroom community for central Yokohama and Tokyo due to its extensive commuter train infrastructure.

== Transportation ==
=== Railroads ===
- Keihin Electric Express Railway - Keikyū Main Line
  - Koganechō – Minami-Ōta - Idogaya – Gumyōji
- Yokohama City Transportation Bureau – Blue Line
  - Bandōbashi – Yoshinochō – Maita – Gumyōji

=== Highways ===
- Shuto Expressway Kanagawa No. 3
- Yokohama Yokosuka Road
- Route 16

==== Prefecture roads ====
- Kanagawa Prefecture Road 21
- Kanagawa Prefecture Road 218

== Education ==
Kanagawa Prefectural Board of Education operates prefectural high schools:

- Seiryo High School
- Yokohama High School of International Studies

Yokohama Municipal Board of Education operates municipal high schools:

- Yokohama Shogyo High School
- Yokohama Sogo High School

Private schools:

- Aoyama Gakuin Yokohama Eiwa High School (formerly Yokohama Eiwa Girls' School)
- Kanto Gakuin Junior & Senior High School

The municipal board of education operates public elementary and junior high schools.

Municipal junior high schools:

- Fujinoki (藤の木)
- Heiraku (平楽)
- Kyoshin (共進)
- Maita (蒔田)
- Minami (南)
- Minamigaoka (南が丘)
- Mutsukawa (六ツ川)
- Nagata (永田)

Municipal elementary schools:

- Bessho (別所)
- Fujinoki (藤の木)
- Hie (日枝)
- Idogaya (井土ケ谷)
- Ishikawa (石川)
- Maita (蒔田)
- Minami (南)
- Minami Ota (南太田)
- Minami Yoshida (南吉田)
- Mutsukawa (六つ川)
- Mutsukawadai (六つ川台)
- Mutsukawa Nishi (六つ川西)
- Nagata (永田)
- Nagatadai (永田台)
- Nakamura (中村)
- Ooka (大岡)
- Ota (太田)

Fujimidai Elementary School (富士見台小学校), Sakuraoka Elementary School (桜岡小学校), Setogaya Elementary School (瀬戸ケ谷小学校), and Takigashira Elementary School (滝頭小学校), which have their campuses outside of Minami-ku, have zones that includes portions of Minami-ku.

== Local attractions ==
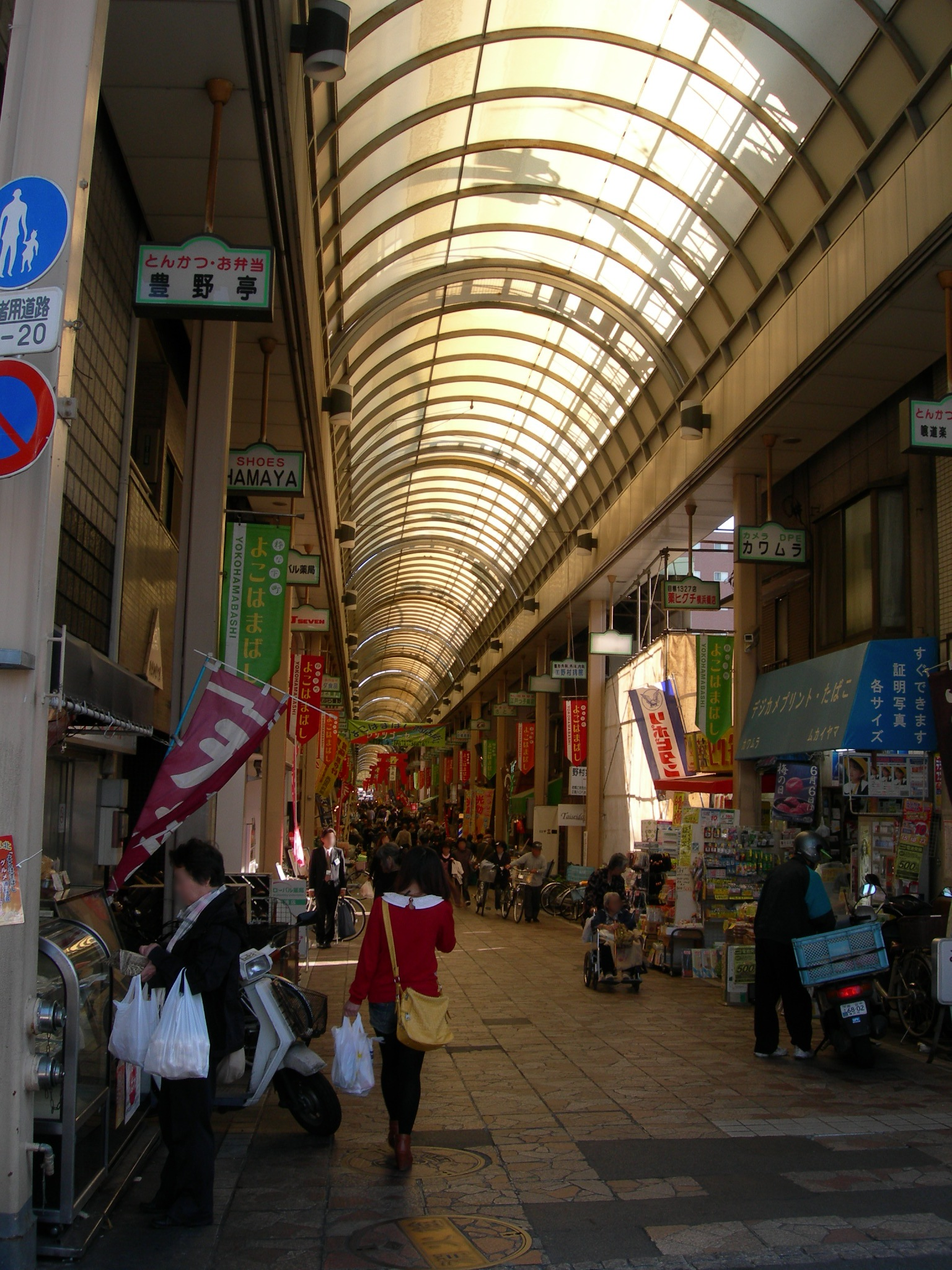
Yokohama-Bashi Shopping district

- Gumyōji temple
- Yokohama Municipal Children's Botanical Garden
- Yokohamabashi Shopping District (in Maganechō)
- Ōyamanezunomikoto Shinji Kyōkai headquarters

== Noted people from Minami Ward ==
- Yuki Saito, actress
- Erika Umeda, singer
- Tadanobu Asano, singer
- Yuichi Nakamura, actor
- Akira Kamiya, voice actor
- Shunji Karube, Olympic runner
