= Idogaya Station =

Railway station in Yokohama, Japan

KK42 Idogaya Station 井土ヶ谷駅
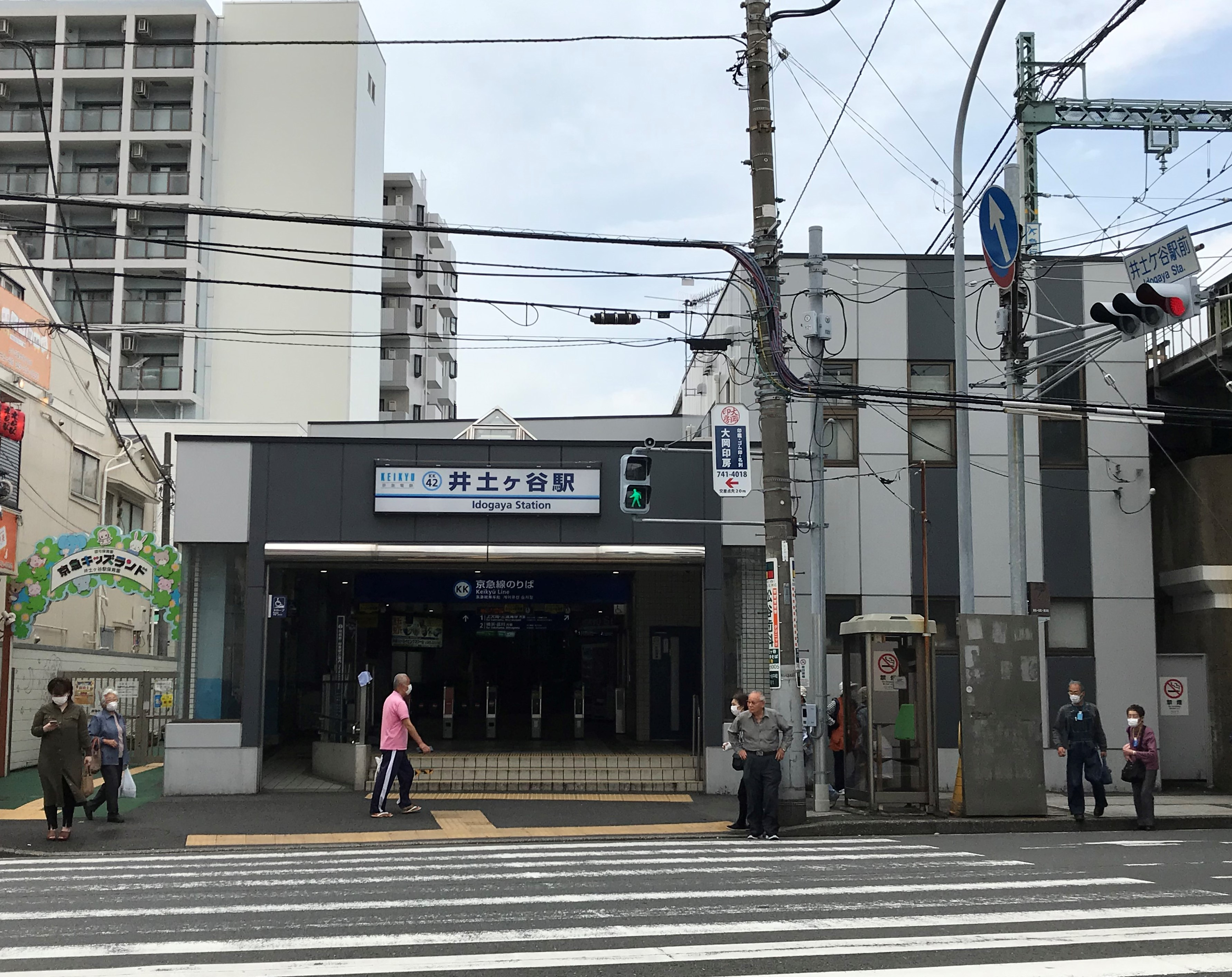
- Idogaya Station, May 2020

General information
- Location: Idogaya Nakamachi, Minami-ku, Yokohama-shi, Kanagawa-ken 232-0052; Japan
- Coordinates: 35.4340°N 139.6004°E
- Operator: Keikyū
- Line: Keikyū Main Line
- Distance: 27.7 km from Shinagawa
- Platforms: 2 side platforms
- Connections: Bus stop

Other information
- Station code: KK42
- Website: Official website

History
- Opened: April 1, 1930

Passengers
- 2019: 29,035 daily

Services
Preceding station	Keikyu	Following station
Gumyōji KK43 towards Kanazawa-hakkei	Main Line Express	Hinodechō KK39 towards Keikyū Kamata
Gumyōji KK43 towards Uraga	Main Line Local	Minami-Ōta KK41 towards Shinagawa
Location
- Location within Kanagawa Prefecture Location within Japan

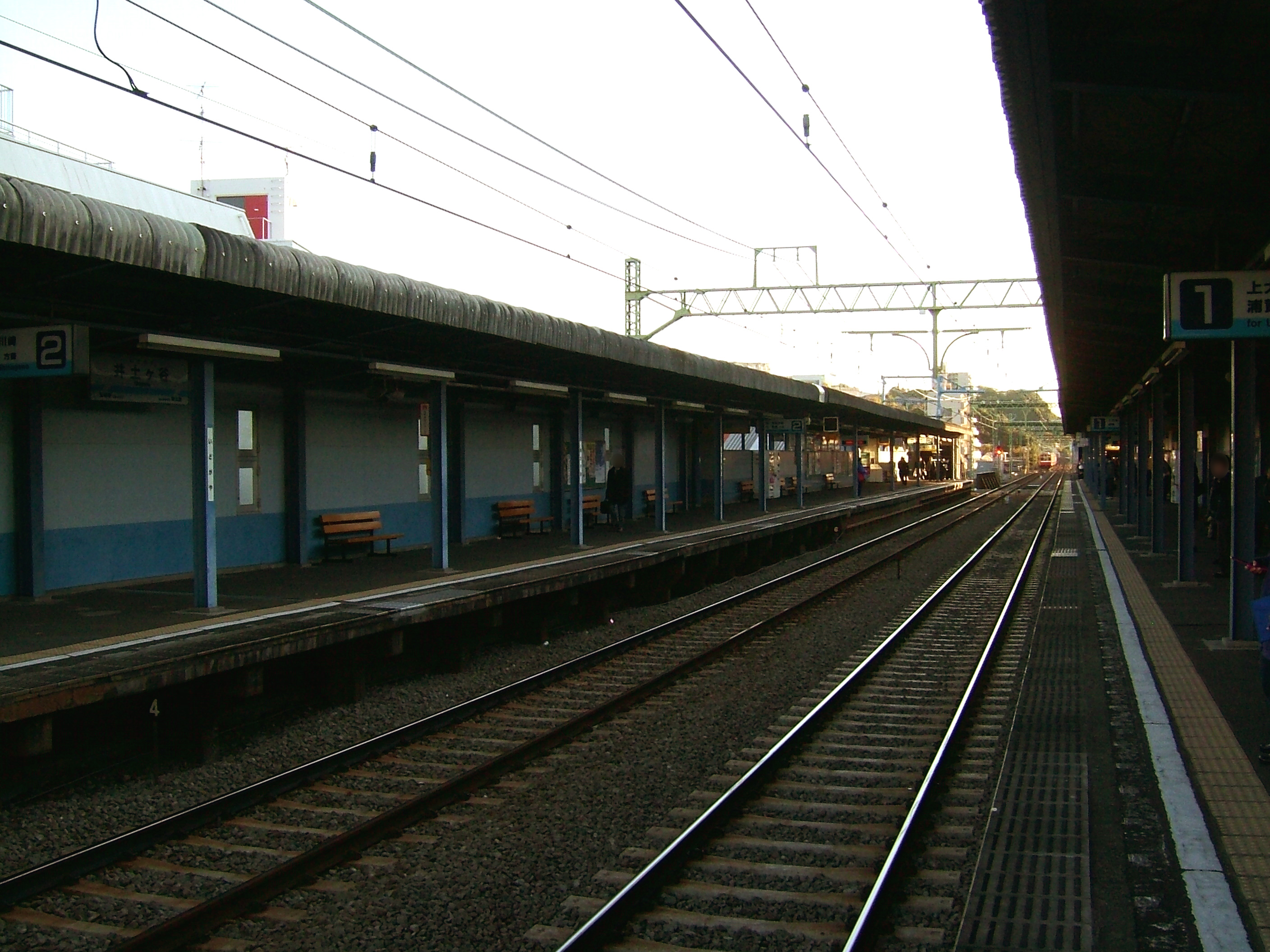
Platforms

Idogaya Station (井土ヶ谷駅, Idogaya-eki) is a passenger railway station located in Minami-ku, Yokohama, Kanagawa Prefecture, Japan, operated by the private railway company Keikyū.

== Lines ==
Idogaya Station is served by the Keikyū Main Line and is located 27.7 kilometers from the terminus of the line at Shinagawa Station in Tokyo.

== Station layout ==
The station consists of two elevated opposed side platforms with the station building underneath.

=== Platforms ===
1	■ Keikyū Main Line	for Kamiōoka, Zushi·Hayama, Uraga
2	■ Keikyū Main Line	for Yokohama, Haneda Airport Terminal 1·2, Shinagawa, Sengakuji, Oshiage

== History ==
Idogaya Station was opened on April 1, 1930. The platform for north-bound trains was lengthened to accommodate 8-car long trains in 1978, and the south-bound platform was similarly lengthened in 1987.

Keikyū introduced station numbering to its stations on 21 October 2010; Idogaya Station was assigned station number KK41.

== Passenger statistics ==
In fiscal 2019, the station was used by an average of 29,035 passengers daily.

The passenger figures for previous years are as shown below.

Fiscal year	daily average
2005	27,140
2010	26,837
2015	28,257

== Surrounding area ==
- Yokohama City Idogaya Elementary School
- Yokohama Minami Post Office

== See also ==
- List of railway stations in Japan
