= Gumyōji Station (Keikyu) =

Railway station in Yokohama, Japan

KK43 Gumyōji Station 弘明寺駅
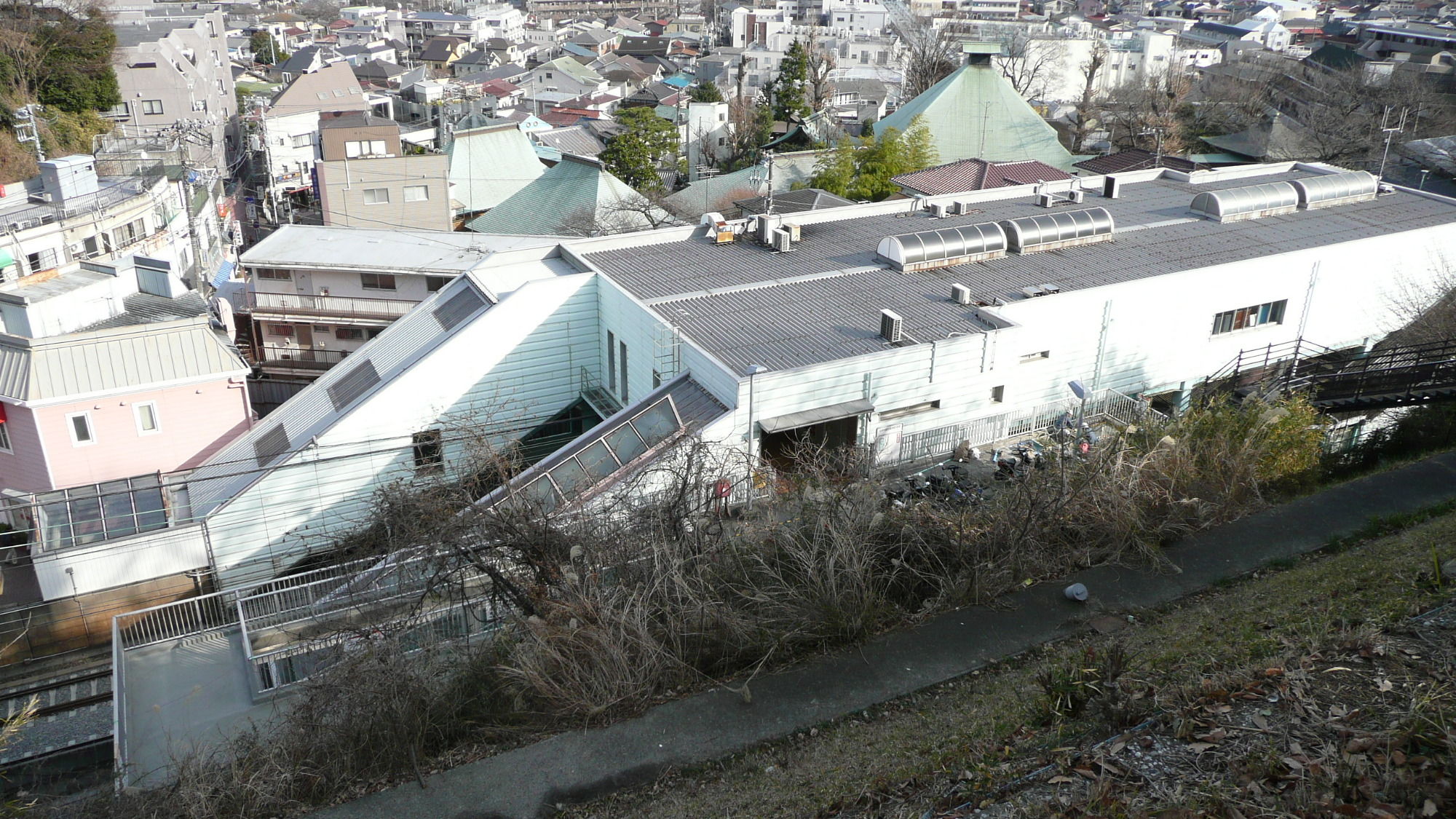
- Gumyōji Station seen from nearby hill

General information
- Location: Gumyōji 267, Minami-ku, Yokohama-shi, Kanagawa-ken 232-0067; Japan
- Coordinates: 35°25′27.5″N 139°35′48.5″E
- Operator: Keikyū
- Line: Keikyū Main Line
- Distance: 29.1 km from Shinagawa
- Platforms: 2 side platforms
- Connections: Bus stop

Other information
- Station code: KK43
- Website: Official website

History
- Opened: April 1, 1930

Passengers
- 2019: 29,663 daily

Services
Preceding station	Keikyu	Following station
Kamiōoka KK44 towards Kanazawa-hakkei	Main Line Express	Idogaya KK42 towards Keikyū Kamata
Kamiōoka KK44 towards Uraga	Main Line Local	Idogaya KK42 towards Shinagawa
Location
- Location within Kanagawa Prefecture Location within Japan

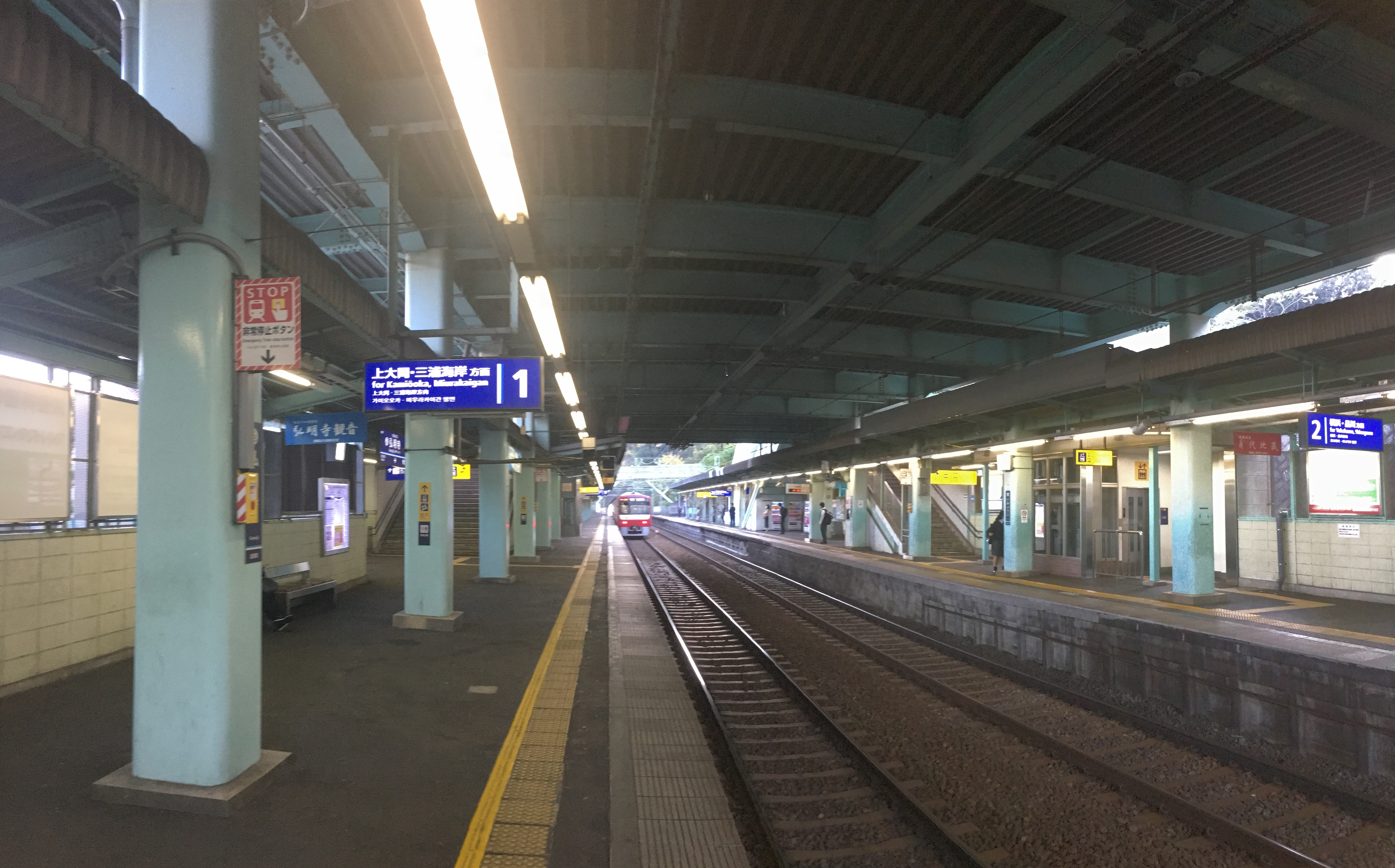
Platforms, 2020

Gumyōji Station (弘明寺駅, Gumyōji-eki) is a passenger railway station located in Minami-ku, Yokohama, Kanagawa Prefecture, Japan, operated by the private railway company operated by the Keikyū. Note that Gumyōji Station of the Yokohama Municipal Subway is located about 500 m away, on the other side of the Gumyōji Kannon Shopping Street (弘明寺かんのん通り商店街).

== Lines ==
Gumyōji Station is served by the Keikyū Main Line and is located 29.1 kilometers from the terminus of the line at Shinagawa Station in Tokyo.

== Station layout ==
The station consists of two elevated opposed side platforms with the station building located underneath.

=== Platforms ===
1	■ Keikyū Main Line	for Kamiōoka, Zushi·Hayama, Uraga
2	■ Keikyū Main Line	for Yokohama, Haneda Airport Terminal 1·2, Shinagawa, Sengakuji, Oshiage

== History ==
Gumyōji Station was opened on April 1, 1930 as a station on the Shōnan Electric Railway, which merged with the Keihin Electric Railway on November 1, 1941. The platforms were lengthened to accommodate 6-car long trains in 1969, and a new elevated station building was completed in 1984. The platforms were further lengthened to accommodate 8-car long trains in December 1987.

Keikyū introduced station numbering to its stations on 21 October 2010; Gumyōji Station was assigned station number KK43.

== Passenger statistics ==
In fiscal 2019, the station was used by an average of 29,663 passengers daily.

The passenger figures for previous years are as shown below.

Fiscal year	daily average
2005	28,350
2010	29,082
2015	29,935

== Surrounding area ==
- Gumyoji Park
- Yokohama City Minami Library
- Yokohama City Minami Junior High School
- Yokohama Gumyoji Post Office
- Yokohama City Ooka District Center
- Yokohama City Minami Sports Center

== See also ==
- List of railway stations in Japan
