= Yayoidai Station =

Railway station in Yokohama, Japan

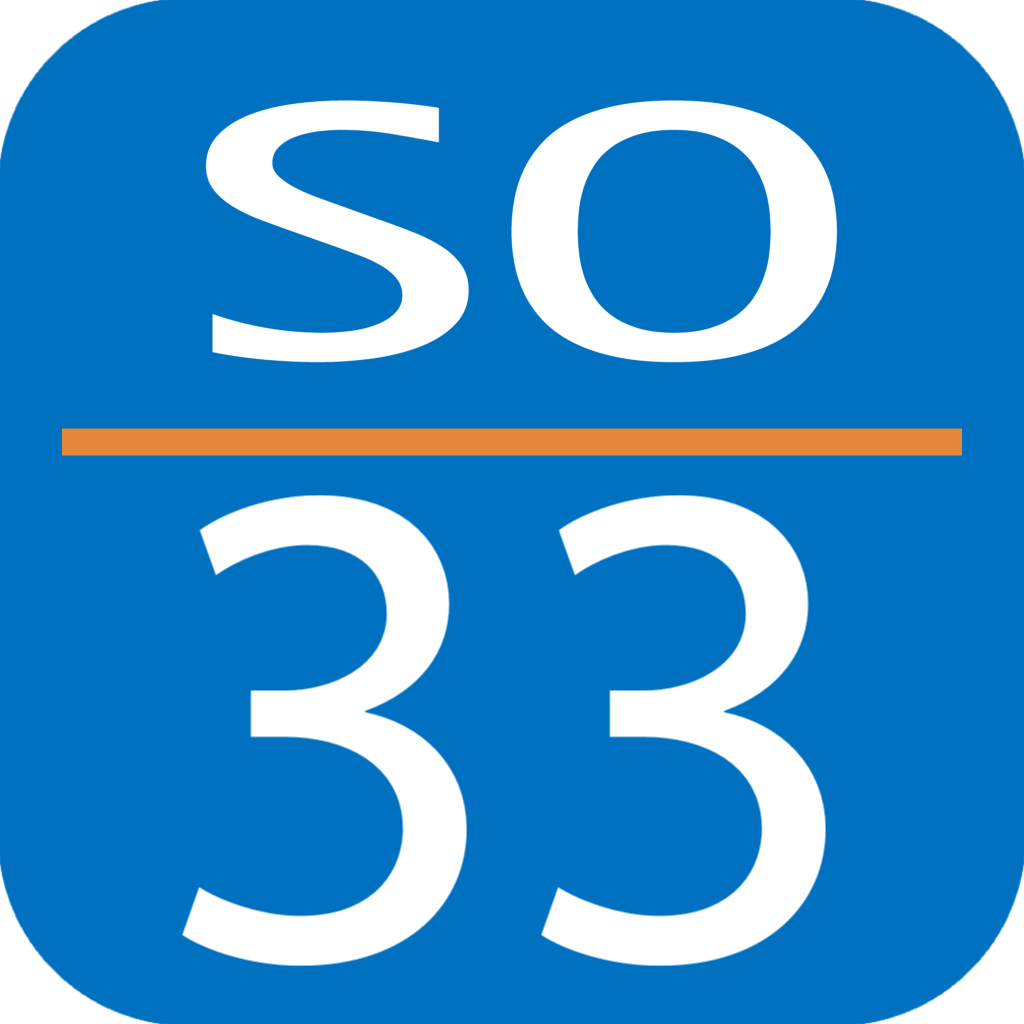
Yayoidai Station 弥生台駅

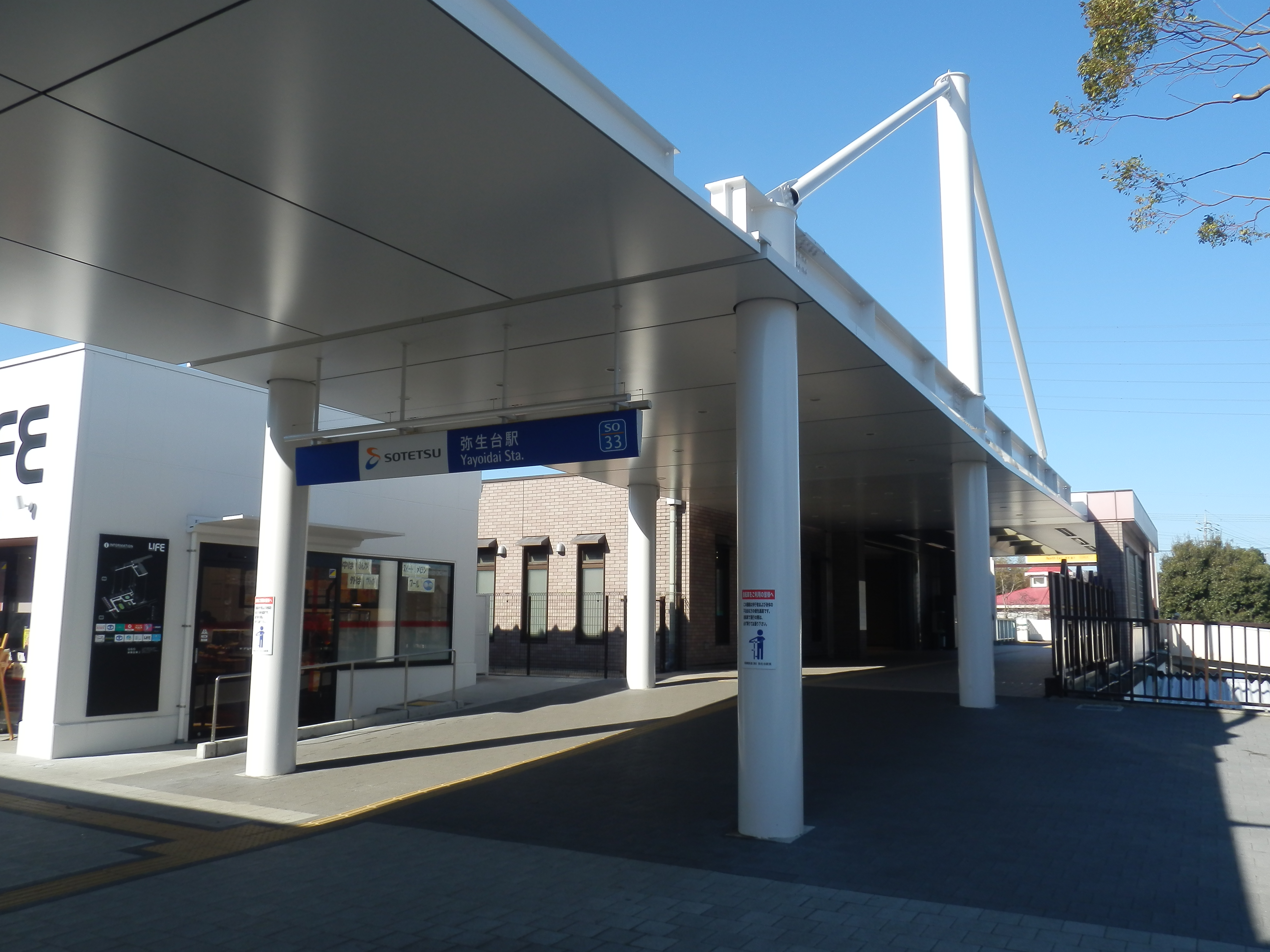
- South Exit, 2019

General information
- Location: 5-2 Yayoidai, Izumi-ku, Yokohama-shi, Kanagawa-ken 245-0008; Japan
- Coordinates: 35°25′48″N 139°30′23″E
- Operator: Sagami Railway
- Line: Sagami Railway Izumino Line
- Distance: 4.9 km from Futamata-gawa
- Platforms: 2 side platforms

Other information
- Station code: SO33
- Website: Official website

History
- Opened: April 8, 1976

Passengers
- 2019: 15,056 daily

Services
Preceding station	Sagami Railway	Following station
Izumino towards Shōnandai	Sōtetsu Izumino Line Commuter Express Rapid Local	Ryokuentoshi towards Futamata-gawa
Location
- Location within Kanagawa Prefecture Location within Japan

Yayoidai Station (弥生台駅, Yayoidai-eki) is a passenger railway station located in Izumi-ku, Yokohama, Japan, operated by the private railway operator Sagami Railway (Sotetsu).

== Lines ==
Yayoidai Station is served by the Sagami Railway Izumino Line, and lies 4.9 kilometers from the starting point of the line at Futamata-gawa Station.

== Station layout ==
The station consists of two opposed side platforms serving two tracks, connected to the station building by a footbridge. The station is known for its cherry blossom in spring.

=== Platforms ===
1	■ Sagami Railway Izumino Line	for Shōnandai
2	■ Sagami Railway Izumino Line	for Futamata-gawa, (Main Line) Yokohama and Shin-Yokohama

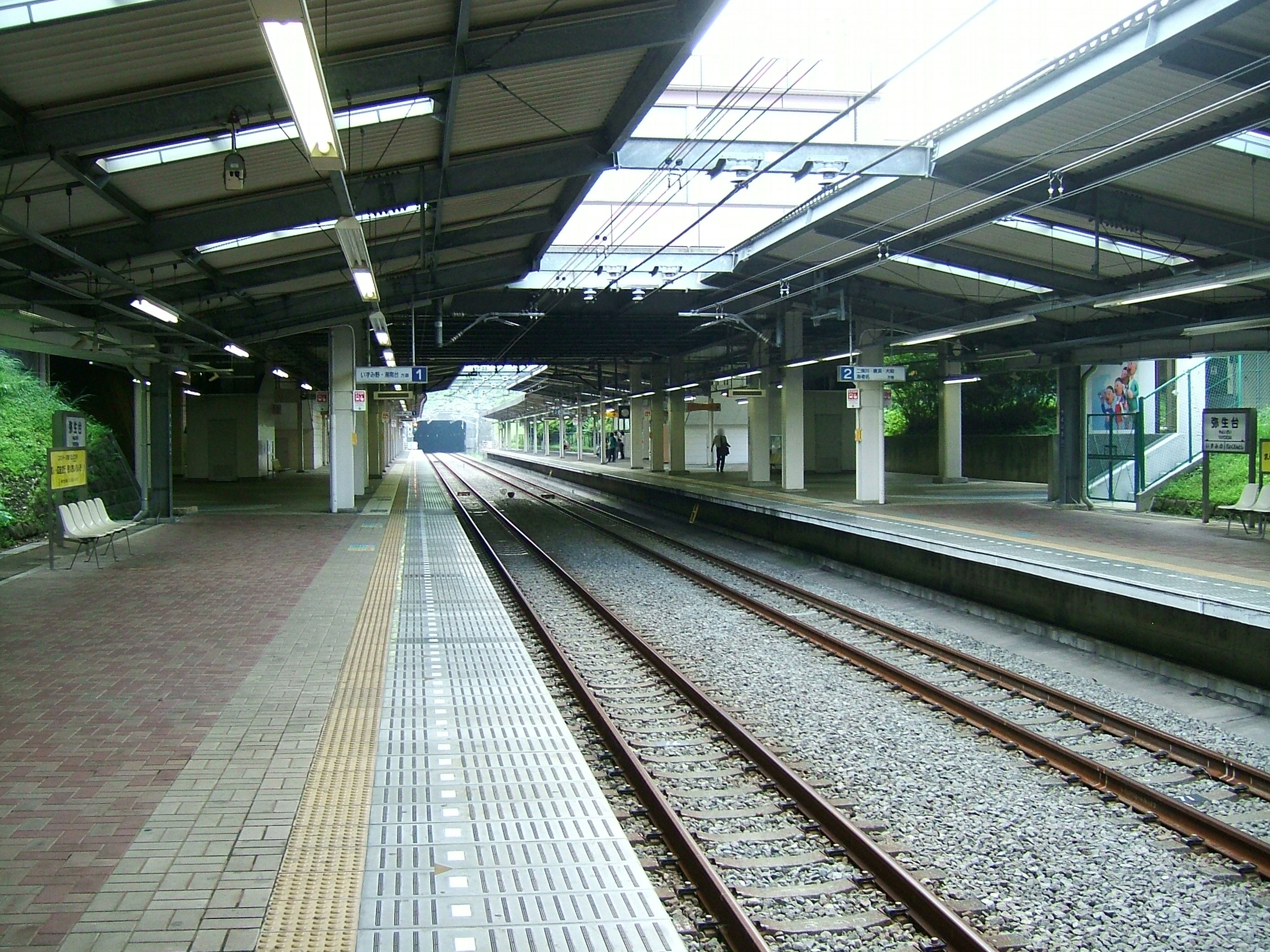
The platforms, September 2008

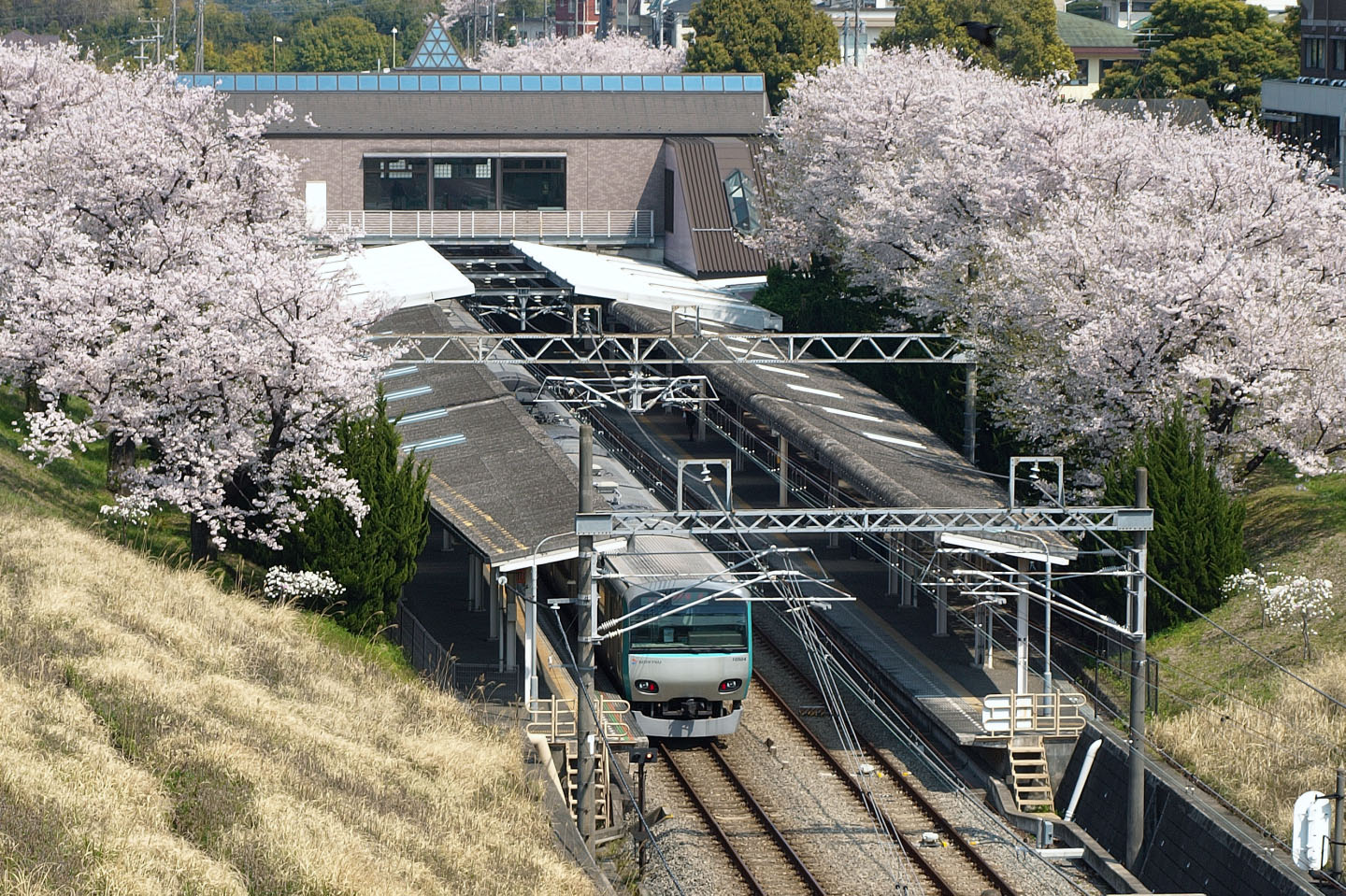
Cherry blossom at Yayoidai Station

== History ==
Yayoidai Station was opened on April 8, 1976. The station building was remodeled on September 30, 1998. From 27 October 2013, an experimental platform edge door system is to be installed for evaluation purposes on the down (Shōnandai-bound) platform. Originally scheduled to be introduced in the summer of 2013, the low-cost system developed by Takamisawa Cybernetics consists of three bars that are raised and lowered in front of the train doors, and will be installed for a length of one carriage on the down platform for a period of one year.

== Passenger statistics ==
In fiscal 2019, the station was used by an average of 15,056 passengers daily.

The passenger figures for previous years are as shown below.

Fiscal year	daily average
2005	16,628
2010	16,448
2015	15,457

== Surrounding area ==
- International Goodwill Hospital (Emergency Hospital)
- Shimbashi Citizen's Forest
- Hatonomoriainoshi Nursery School
- Yayoidai Kindergarten
- Yokohama City Shinbashi Elementary School

== See also ==
- List of railway stations in Japan
