= Izumi-chūō Station (Kanagawa) =

Railway station in Yokohama, Japan

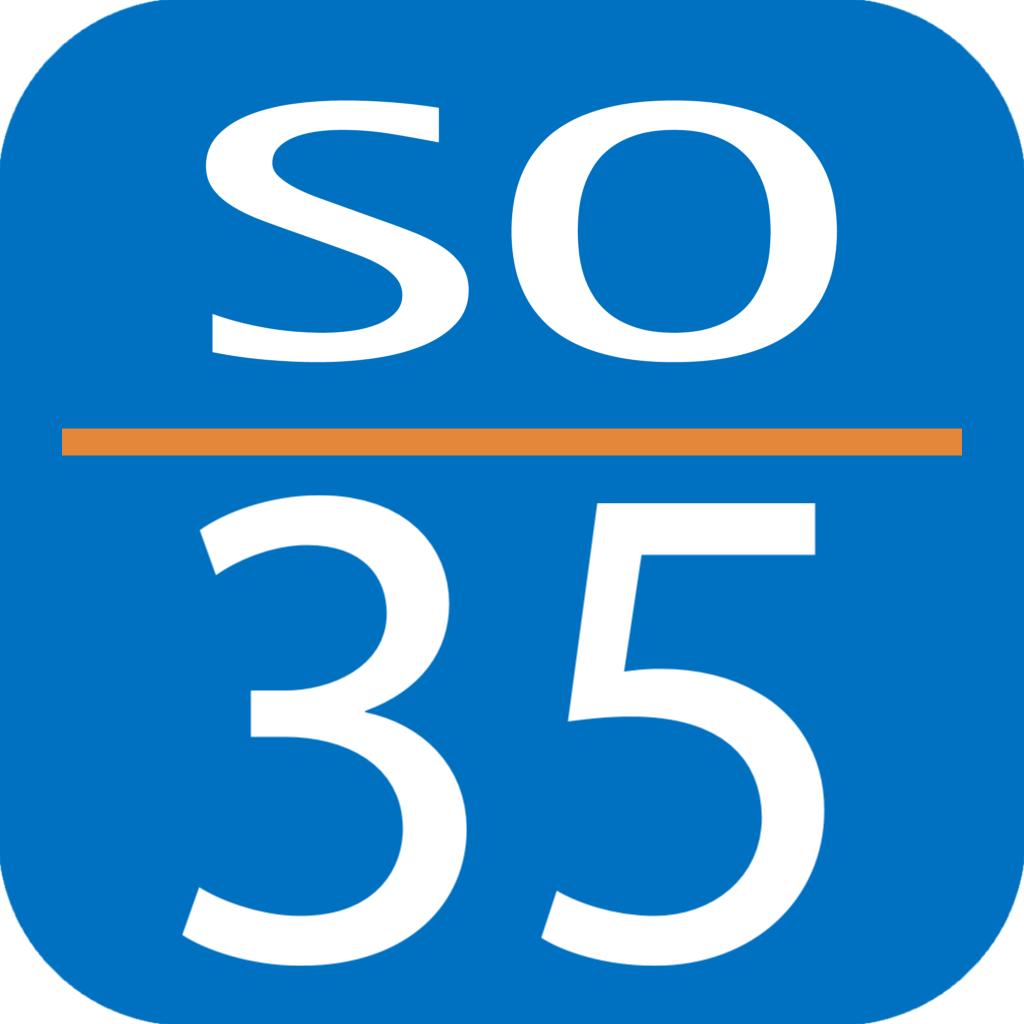
Izumi-chūō Station いずみ中央駅

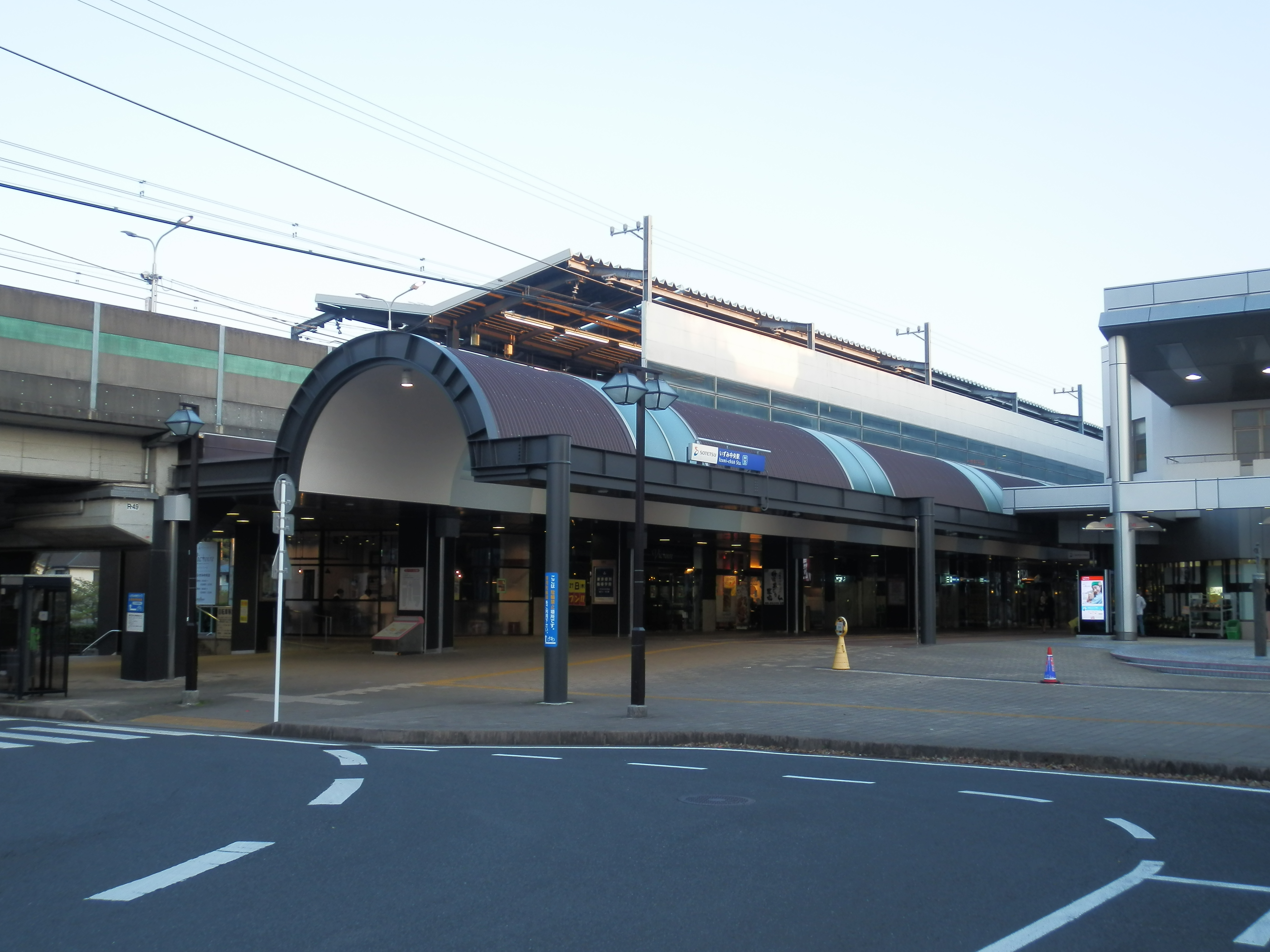
- Izumi-chūō Station exit

General information
- Location: Izumi-chō 3540, Izumi-ku, Yokohama-shi, Kanagawa-ken 245-0023; Japan
- Coordinates: 35°24′54.84″N 139°29′14.20″E
- Operator: Sagami Railway
- Line: Sagami Railway Izumino Line
- Distance: 8.2 km from Futamata-gawa
- Platforms: 1 island platform

Other information
- Station code: SO35
- Website: Official website

History
- Opened: April 4, 1990

Passengers
- 2019: 16,257 daily

Services
Preceding station	Sagami Railway	Following station
Yumegaoka towards Shōnandai	Sōtetsu Izumino Line Commuter Express Rapid Local	Izumino towards Futamata-gawa
Location
- Location within Kanagawa Prefecture Location within Japan

Izumi-chūō Station (いずみ中央駅, Izumi-chūō-eki) is a passenger railway station located in Izumi-ku, Yokohama, Japan, operated by the private railway operator Sagami Railway (Sotetsu).

== Lines ==
Izumi-chūō Station is served by the Sagami Railway Izumino Line, and lies 8.2 kilometers from the starting point of the line at Futamata-gawa Station.

== Station layout ==
The station consists of one elevated island platform serving two tracks, connected to the station building by an underpass. The station building is built underneath the platforms and tracks.

=== Platforms ===
1	■ Sagami Railway Izumino Line	for Shōnandai
2	■ Sagami Railway Izumino Line	for Futamata-gawa, Yokohama and Shin-Yokohama (transfer at Futamata-gawa for Yamato and Ebina)

== History ==
Izumi-chūō Station was opened on April 4, 1990.

== Passenger statistics ==
In fiscal 2019, the station was used by an average of 16,257 passengers daily.

The passenger figures for previous years are as shown below.

Fiscal year	daily average
2005	15,088
2010	16,061
2015	15,772

== Surrounding area ==
- Yokohama City Izumi Ward Office
- Yokohama City Izumi Auditorium
- Yokohama City Nakawada Junior High School

== See also ==
- List of railway stations in Japan
