= Ryokuentoshi Station =

Railway station in Yokohama, Japan

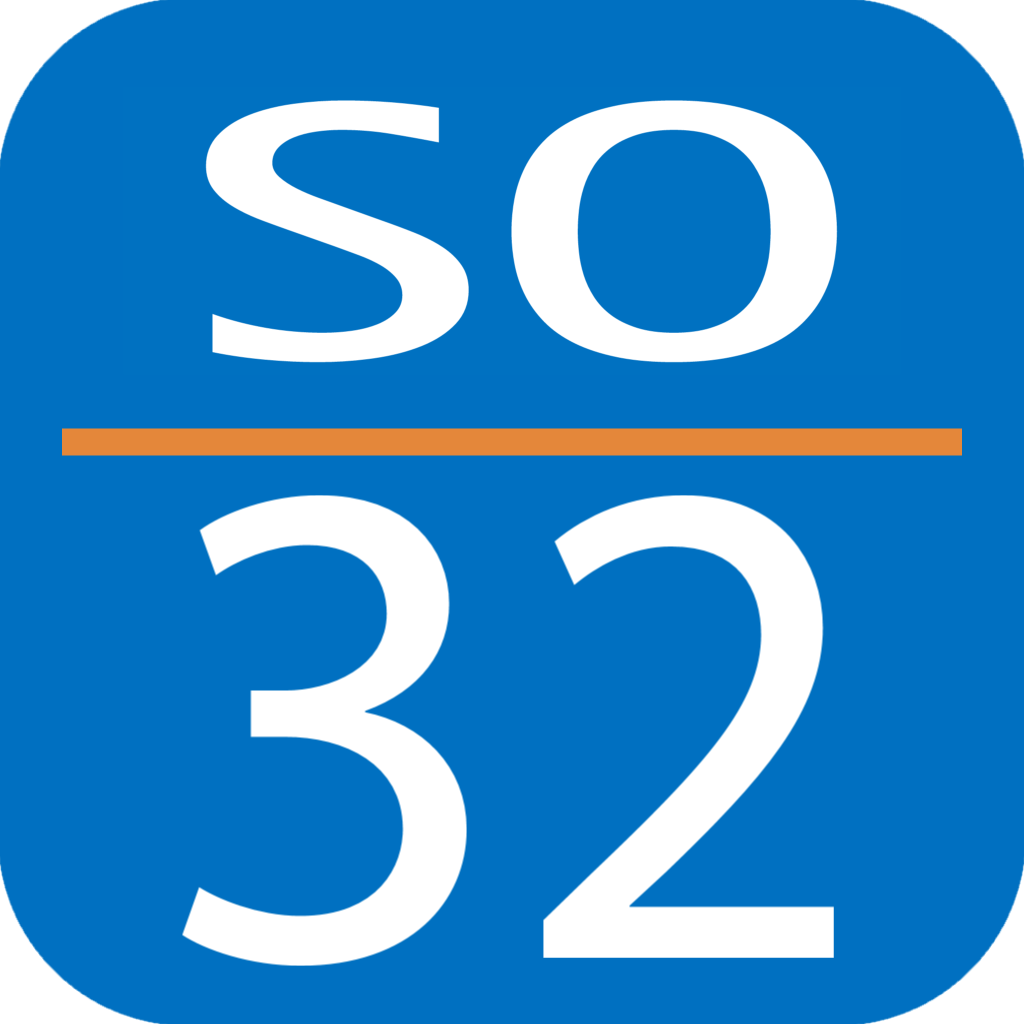
Ryokuentoshi Station 緑園都市駅

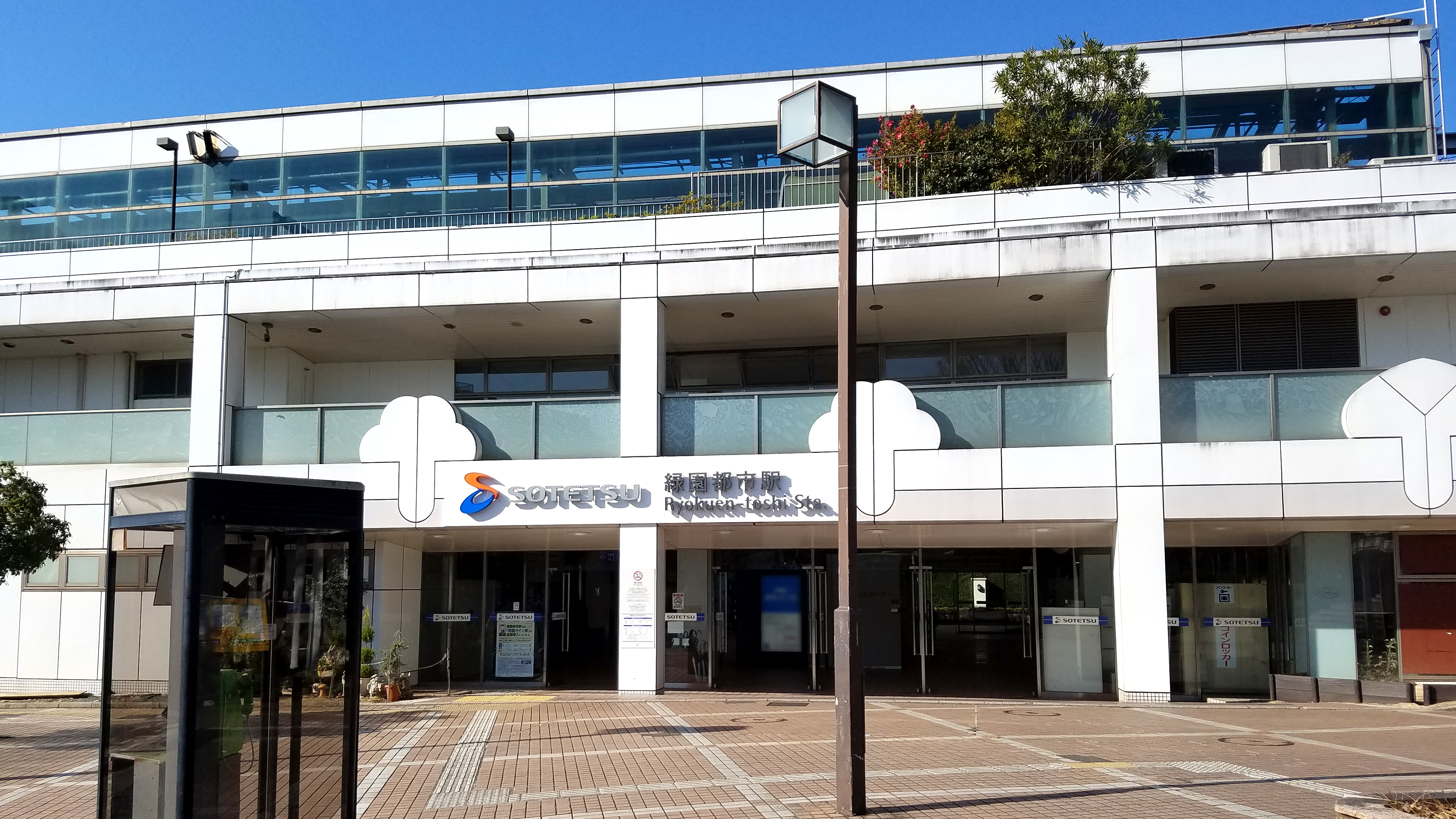
- Entrance to Ryokuentoshi Station

General information
- Location: Ryokuen 3-1-1, Izumi-ku, Yokohama-shi, Kanagawa-ken 245-0002; Japan
- Coordinates: 35°26′21.51″N 139°31′18.78″E
- Operator: Sagami Railway
- Line: Sagami Railway Izumino Line
- Distance: 3.1 km from Futamata-gawa
- Platforms: 2 side platforms

Other information
- Station code: SO32
- Website: Official website

History
- Opened: April 8, 1976

Passengers
- 2019: 25,276 daily

Services
Preceding station	Sagami Railway	Following station
Yayoidai towards Shōnandai	Sōtetsu Izumino Line Commuter Express Rapid Local	Minami-Makigahara towards Futamata-gawa
Location
- Location within Kanagawa Prefecture Location within Japan

Ryokuentoshi Station (緑園都市駅, Ryokuentoshi eki) is a passenger railway station located in Izumi-ku, Yokohama, Japan, operated by the private railway operator Sagami Railway (Sotetsu).

== Lines ==
Ryokuentoshi Station is served by the Sagami Railway Izumino Line, and lies 3.1 kilometers from the starting point of the line at Futamata-gawa Station.

== Station layout ==
The station consists of two opposed side platforms serving two tracks, with an elevated station building.

=== Platforms ===
1	■ Sagami Railway Izumino Line	for Shōnandai
2	■ Sagami Railway Izumino Line	for Futamata-gawa, (Main Line) Yokohama and Shin-Yokohama

== History ==
Ryokuentoshi Station was opened on April 8, 1976.

== Passenger statistics ==
In fiscal 2019, the station was used by an average of 25,276 passengers daily.

The passenger figures for previous years are as shown below.

Fiscal year	daily average
2005	26,498
2010	26,671
2015	26,171

== Surrounding area ==
- Nakaman Gakuin Ryokuen City School
- Sotetsu Cultural Center
- Ferris University (Ryokuen campus)

== See also ==
- List of railway stations in Japan
