= Yumegaoka Station =

Railway station in Yokohama, Japan

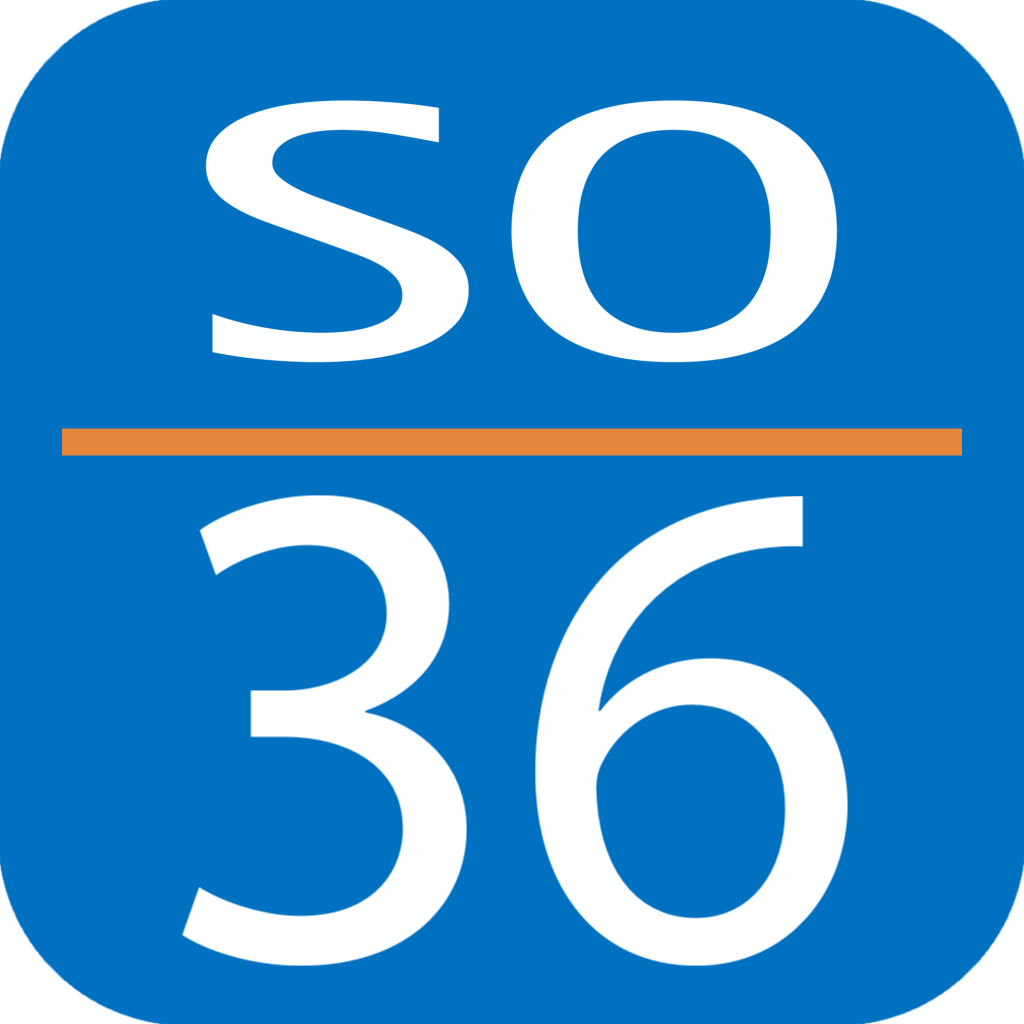
Yumegaoka Station ゆめが丘駅

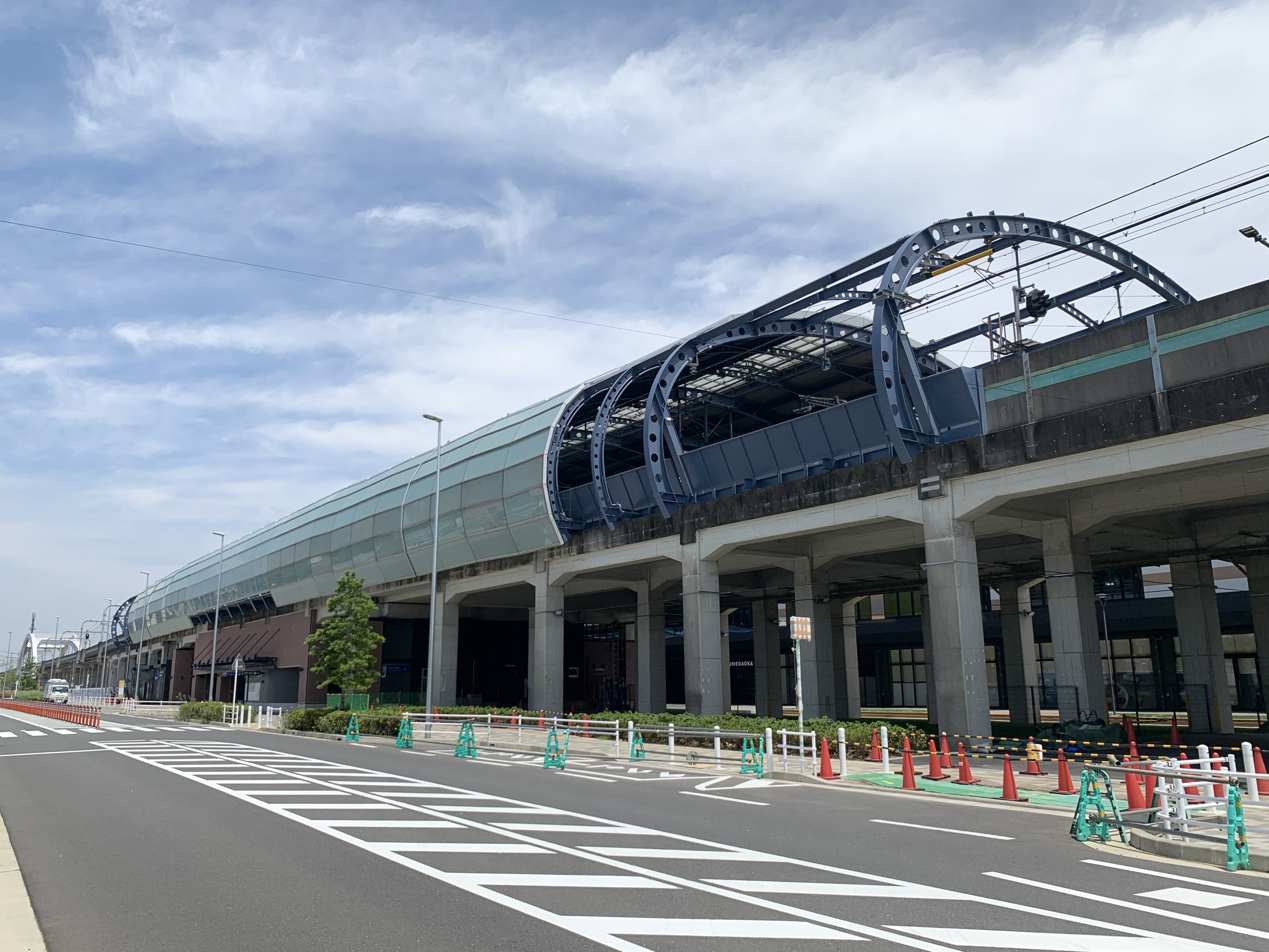
- Yumegaoka Station in May 2024

General information
- Location: Shimoiida-chō 1555-9, Izumi-ku, Yokohama-shi, Kanagawa-ken 245-0017; Japan
- Coordinates: 35°24′18.85″N 139°28′56.44″E
- Operator: Sagami Railway
- Line: Sagami Railway Izumino Line
- Distance: 9.3 km from Futamata-gawa
- Platforms: 1 island platform

Other information
- Station code: SO36
- Website: Official website

History
- Opened: March 10, 1999

Passengers
- 2019: 2,208 daily

Services
Preceding station	Sagami Railway	Following station
Shōnandai Terminus	Sōtetsu Izumino Line Commuter Express Rapid Local	Izumi-chūō towards Futamata-gawa
Location
- Location within Kanagawa Prefecture Location within Japan

Yumegaoka Station (ゆめが丘駅, Yumegaoka-eki) is a passenger railway station located in Izumi-ku, Yokohama, Japan, operated by the private railway operator Sagami Railway (Sotetsu).

== Lines ==
Yumegaoka Station is served by the Sagami Railway Izumino Line, and lies 9.3 kilometers from the starting point of the line at Futamata-gawa Station.

== Station layout ==
The station consists of a single island platform serving two tracks. The station is elevated and is built on top of a road using a Nielsen Lohse Bridge design.

=== Platforms ===
1	■ Sagami Railway Izumino Line	for Shōnandai
2	■ Sagami Railway Izumino Line	for Futamata-gawa・(Main Line) Yokohama and Shin-Yokohama

== History ==
Yumegaoka Station was opened on March 10, 1999.

== Passenger statistics ==
In fiscal 2019, the station was used by an average of 2,208 passengers daily.

The passenger figures for previous years are as shown below.

Fiscal year	daily average
2005	1,322
2010	2,120
2015	2,270

== Surrounding area ==
- Yumegaoka housing district

== See also ==
- List of railway stations in Japan
