= Minami-Makigahara Station =

Railway station in Yokohama, Japan

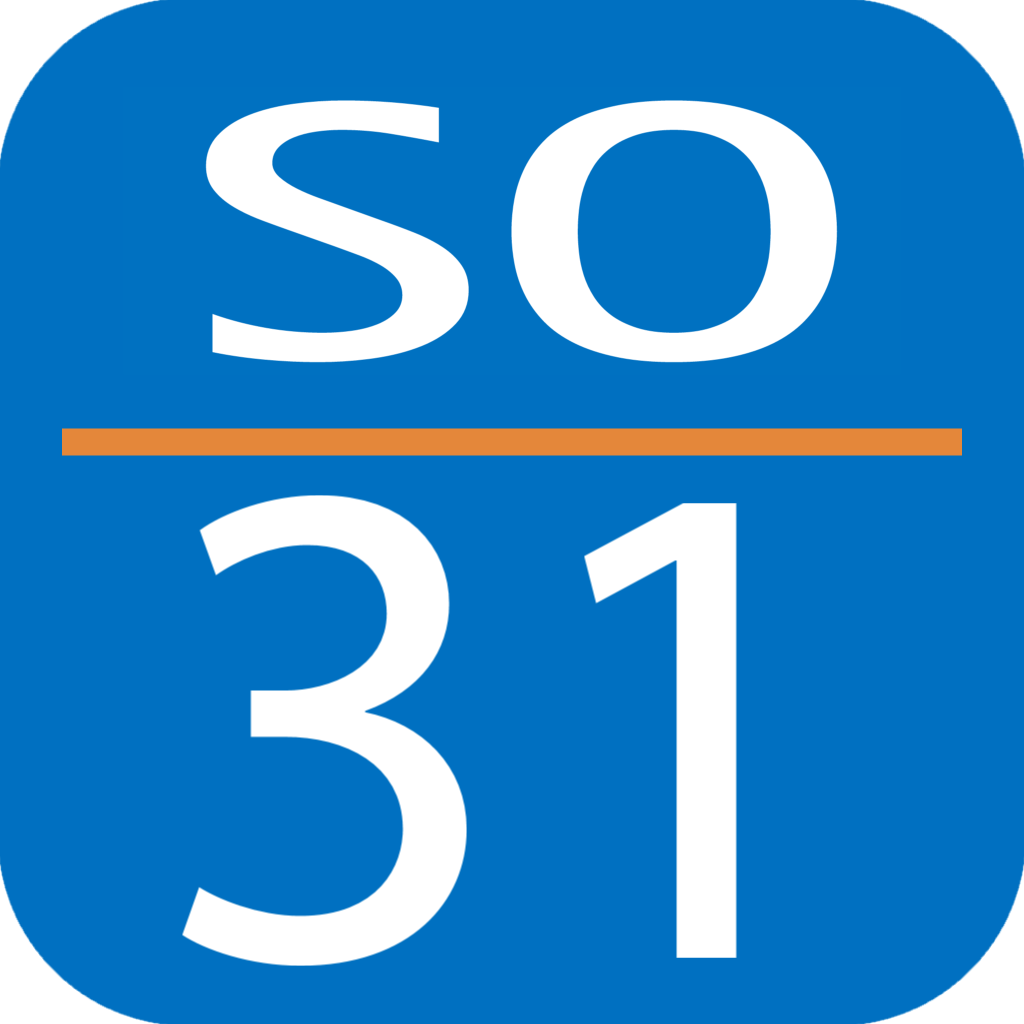
Minami-Makigahara Station 南万騎が原駅

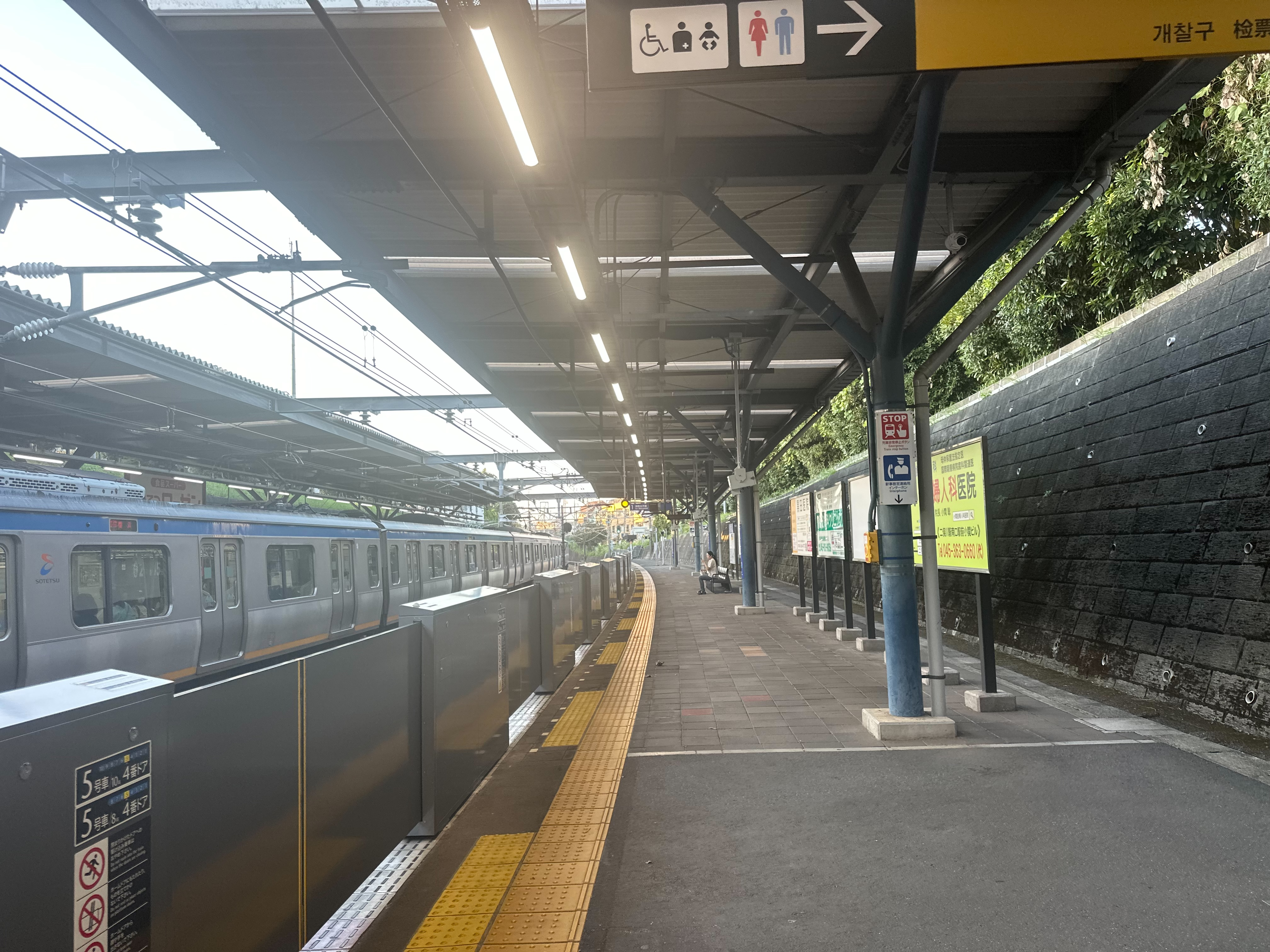
- Minami-Makigahara Station platforms

General information
- Location: Kashiwa-chō 128, Asahi-ku, Yokohama-shi, Kanagawa-ken 241-0835; Japan
- Coordinates: 35°27′08.190″N 139°31′34.450″E
- Operator: Sagami Railway
- Line: Sagami Railway Izumino Line
- Distance: 1.6 km from Futamata-gawa
- Platforms: 2 side platforms

Other information
- Station code: SO31
- Website: Official website

History
- Opened: April 8, 1976

Passengers
- 2019: 11,732 daily

Services
Preceding station	Sagami Railway	Following station
Ryokuentoshi towards Shōnandai	Sōtetsu Izumino Line Commuter Express Rapid Local	Futamata-gawa Terminus
Location
- Location within Kanagawa Prefecture Location within Japan

Minami-Makigahara Station (南万騎が原駅, Minami-Makigahara-eki) is a passenger railway station located in Asahi-ku, Yokohama, Japan, operated by the private railway operator Sagami Railway (Sotetsu).

== Lines ==
Minami-Makigahara Station is served by the Sagami Railway Izumino Line, and lies 1.6 kilometers from the starting point of the line at Futamata-gawa Station.

== Station layout ==
The station consists of two opposed side platforms serving two tracks, with the station building elevated, and built on top of the platforms and tracks.

=== Platforms ===
1	■ Sagami Railway Izumino Line	for Shōnandai
2	■ Sagami Railway Izumino Line	for Futamata-gawa・(Main Line) Yokohama and Shin-Yokohama

== History ==
Minami-Makigahara Station was opened on April 8, 1976.

== Passenger statistics ==
In fiscal 2019, the station was used by an average of 11,732 passengers daily.

The passenger figures for previous years are as shown below.

Fiscal year	daily average
2005	5,364
2010	11,168
2015	10,841

== Surrounding area ==
- Children's Nature Park
- Yokohama District Legal Affairs Bureau Asahi Branch Office
- Yokohama Makigahara Elementary School
- Yokohama City Sachigaoka Elementary School

== See also ==
- List of railway stations in Japan
