= Izumino Station =

Railway station in Yokohama, Japan

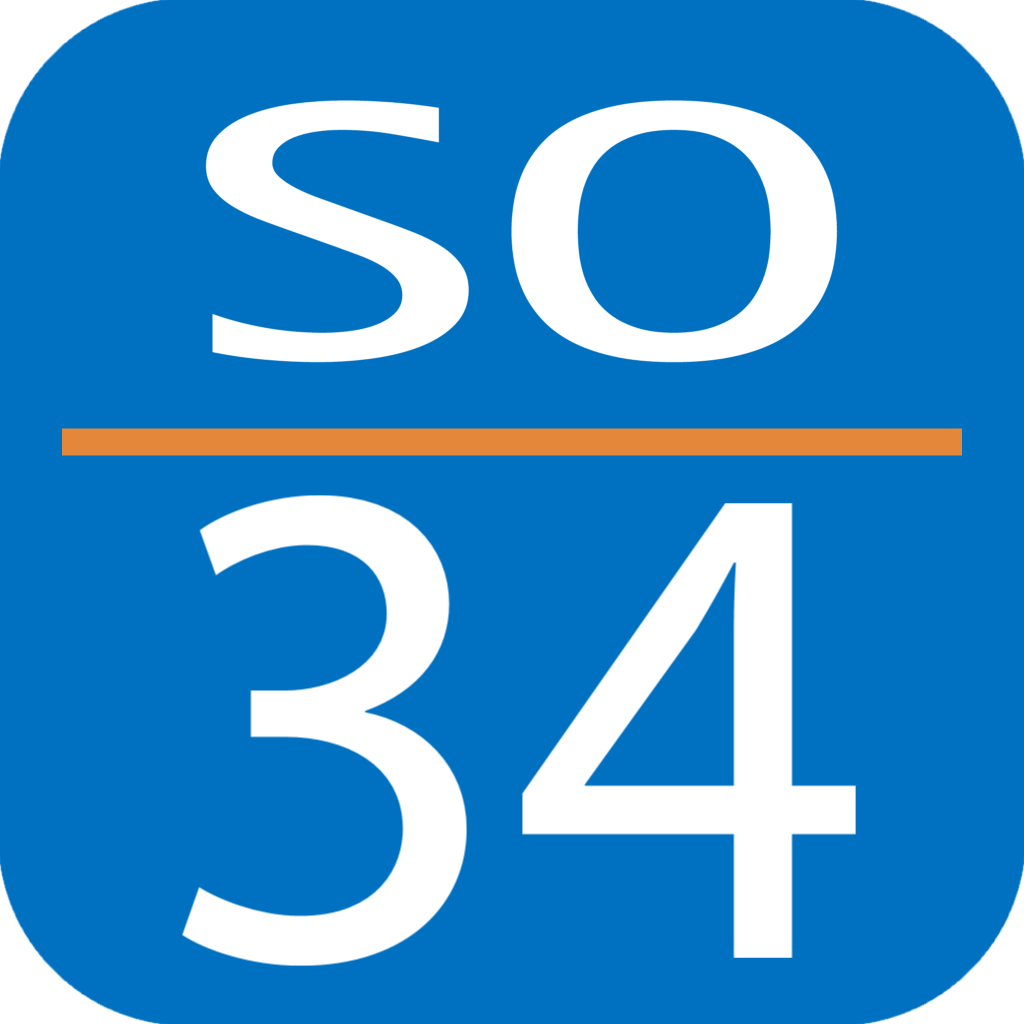
Izumino Station いずみ野駅

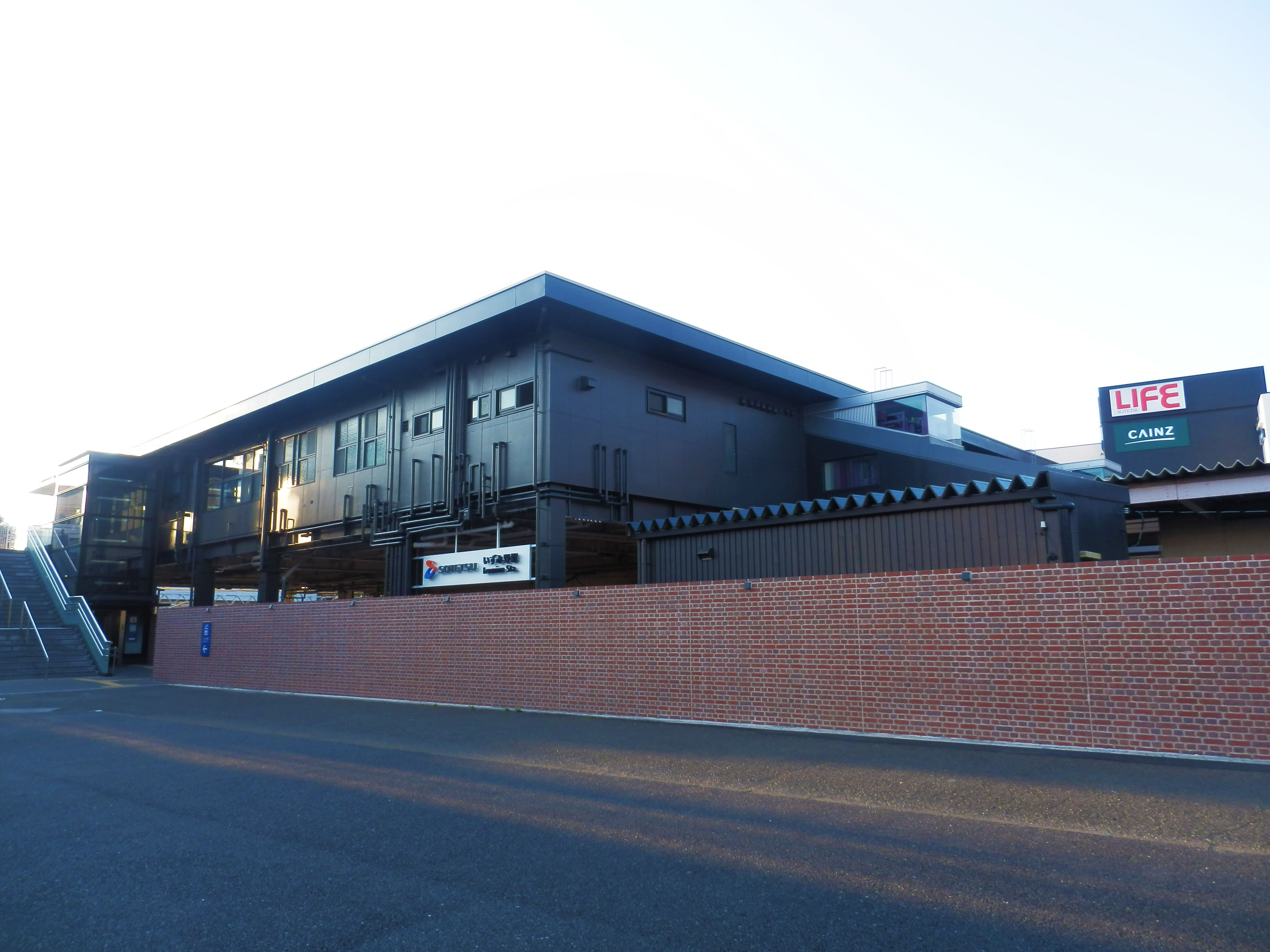
- Izumino Station, 2017

General information
- Location: 5736 Izumi-chō, Izumi-ku, Yokohama-shi, Kanagawa-ken 245-0016; Japan
- Coordinates: 35°25′46″N 139°29′42″E
- Operator: Sagami Railway
- Line: Sagami Railway Izumino Line
- Distance: 6.0 km from Futamata-gawa
- Platforms: 2 island platforms

Other information
- Station code: SO34
- Website: Official website

History
- Opened: April 8, 1976

Passengers
- 2019: 13,753 daily

Services
Preceding station	Sagami Railway	Following station
Shōnandai Terminus	Sōtetsu Izumino Line Limited Express	Futamata-gawa Terminus
Izumi-chūō towards Shōnandai	Sōtetsu Izumino Line Commuter Express Rapid Local	Yayoidai towards Futamata-gawa
Location
- Location within Kanagawa Prefecture Location within Japan

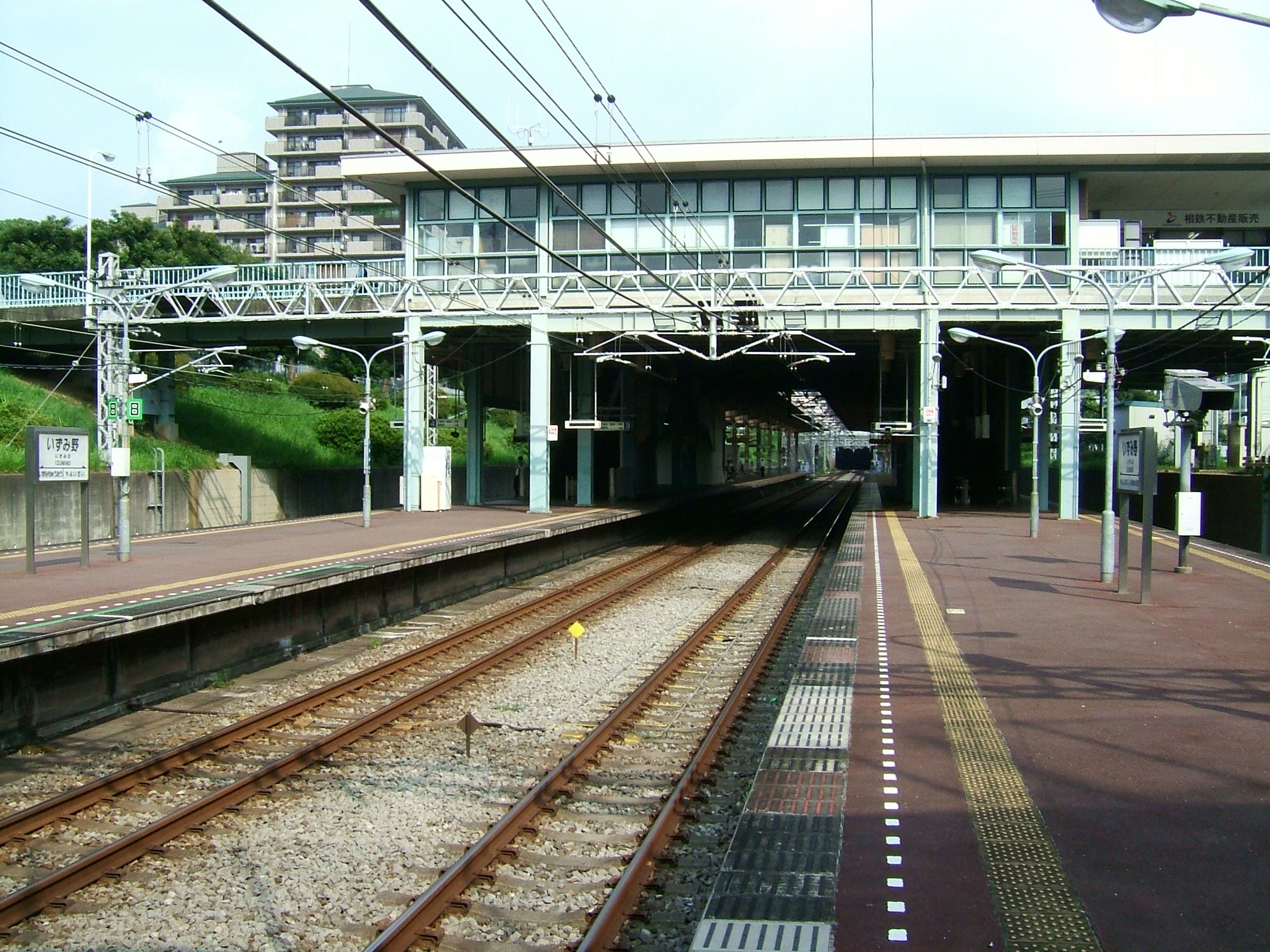
View of the platforms, September 2008

Izumino Station (いずみ野駅, Izumino-eki) is a passenger railway station located in Izumi-ku, Yokohama, Japan, operated by the private railway operator Sagami Railway (Sotetsu).

== Lines ==
Izumino Station is served by the Sagami Railway Izumino Line, and lies 6.0 kilometers from the starting point of the line at Futamata-gawa Station.

== Station layout ==
The station consists of two island platforms serving four tracks, with an elevated station building built over the platforms and tracks.

=== Platforms ===
1,2	■ Sotetsu Izumino Line	for Shōnandai
3,4	■ Sotetsu Izumino Line	for Futamata-gawa, Yokohama and Shin-Yokohama (transfer at Futamata-gawa for Ebina and Yamato)

- Platforms 1 and 4 are normally used by Rapid services.

== History ==
Izumino Station opened on April 8, 1976 as the terminus of the Izumino Line. On April 4, 1990, the line was further extended to Izumi-chūō.

== Passenger statistics ==
In fiscal 2019, the station was used by an average of 13,753 passengers daily.

The passenger figures for previous years are as shown below.

Fiscal year	daily average
2005	15,670
2010	14,500
2015	14,033

== Surrounding area ==
- Kanagawa Prefectural Shoyo High School (神奈川県立松陽高等学校)
- Shuei High School (秀英高等学校)

== See also ==
- List of railway stations in Japan
