= Sōtetsu Izumino Line =

Railway line in Kanagawa Prefecture, Japan

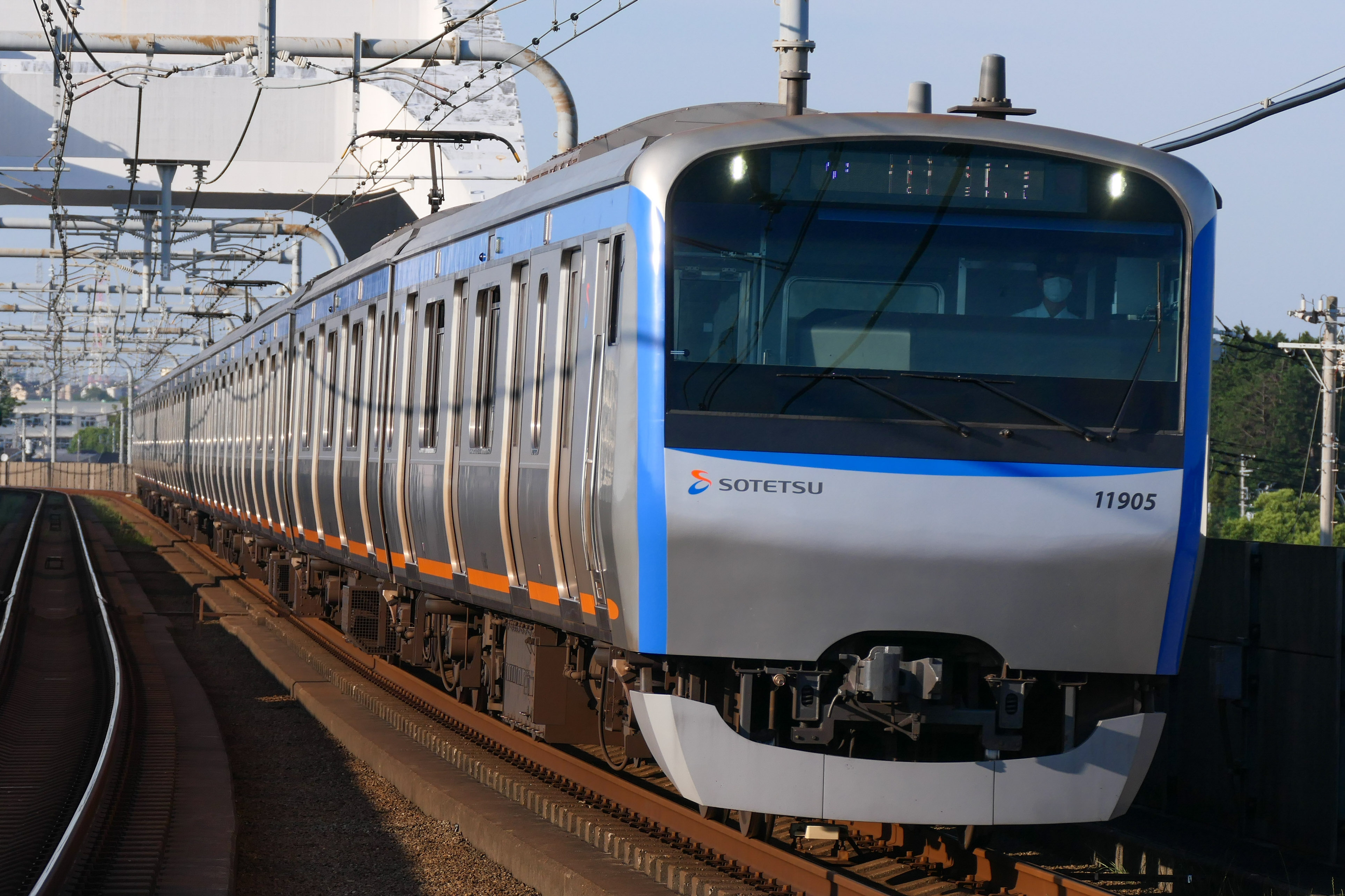
- An 11000 series train in May 2021

Overview
- Owner: Sagami Railway
- Locale: Kanagawa Prefecture
- Termini: Futamata-gawa; Shōnandai
- Stations: 8

Service
- Type: Commuter rail
- Daily ridership: 56,843 (2010)

History
- Opened: April 8, 1976; 50 years ago

Technical
- Line length: 11.3 km (7.0 mi)
- Track gauge: 1,067 mm (3 ft 6 in)
- Electrification: 1,500 V DC overhead catenary
Route map

The Sōtetsu Izumino Line (相鉄いずみ野線, Sōtetsu Izumino-sen) is a railway line in Kanagawa Prefecture, Japan, operated by the private railway operator Sagami Railway (Sotetsu). It connects Futamata-gawa in Yokohama to Shōnandai in Fujisawa.

== Services ==
Services on the Izumino Line operate as a branch of the Main Line, with most trains running through to and from Yokohama via the Main Line, or branching at Nishiya Station to or from Shin-yokohama via the Sōtetsu Shin-yokohama Line which further connect with other railway systems (see Sōtetsu Shin-Yokohama Line for details).

- Local (各停) services stop at all stations to Futamata-gawa, and some services continue to Yokohama stopping at all stations on the Main Line.
- Rapid (快速) services stop at all stations to Futamata-gawa, and continue to Yokohama stopping only at Tsurugamine, Nishiya, and Hoshikawa.
- Commuter Express services stop at all stations to Futamata-gawa.
- Commuter Limited Express (通勤特急) services stop between Shōnandai and Yokohama stopping only at Izumino, Futamata-gawa, Tsurugamine, and Nishiya.

== Station list ==
- Local and rapid services stop at all stations; while commuter limited express services stop between Futamata-gawa and Shōnandai only at Izumino.

No.	Station name	Japanese	Distance (km)			Commuter Limited Express	Transfers	Location
No.	Station name	Japanese	between stations	from Futamata-gawa	from Yokohama	Commuter Limited Express	Transfers	Location
SO-10	Futamata-gawa	二俣川	-	0.0	10.5	●	Sōtetsu Main Line (SO10; through service for Shin-Yokohama/Yokohama)	Asahi-ku, Yokohama
SO-31	Minami-Makigahara	南万騎が原	1.6	1.6	12.1	↑		Asahi-ku, Yokohama
SO-32	Ryokuentoshi	緑園都市	1.5	3.1	13.6	↑		Izumi-ku, Yokohama
SO-33	Yayoidai	弥生台	1.8	4.9	15.4	↑		Izumi-ku, Yokohama
SO-34	Izumino	いずみ野	1.2	6.0	16.5	●		Izumi-ku, Yokohama
SO-35	Izumi-chūō	いずみ中央	2.2	8.2	18.7	↑		Izumi-ku, Yokohama
SO-36	Yumegaoka	ゆめが丘	1.1	9.3	19.8	↑		Izumi-ku, Yokohama
SO-37	Shōnandai	湘南台	2.0	11.3	21.8	●	Enoshima Line (OE09); Blue Line (B01)	Fujisawa, Kanagawa

== History ==
The first section of the line, between Futamata-gawa and Izumino, opened on April 8, 1976, with Izumi-chūō station opening on April 4, 1990. A further extension to Shōnandai opened on March 10, 1999. On February 27, 1999, Rapid service trains started operation.

=== March 2023 timetable revision ===
Through services to and from the Tokyu Toyoko Line courtesy of the Shin-yokohama Line began operation on 18 March 2023. Effective this date, through services from Shonandai continue past Hiyoshi on the Tokyu Shin-yokohama Line towards Wakoshi on the Yurakucho Line.

== Future developments ==
A westward extension from Shōnandai to Kurami Station on the JR East Sagami Line has been proposed. One of the station is to be built near the Keio University Shonan Fujisawa Campus. As a new station is proposed to be built on the Tōkaidō Shinkansen near Kurami, the proposed terminus may become an interchange station with the Shinkansen.

== See also ==
- List of railway lines in Japan
