= Izumi-ku, Yokohama =

Izumi 泉区
- Ward
- Izumi Ward
- Flag

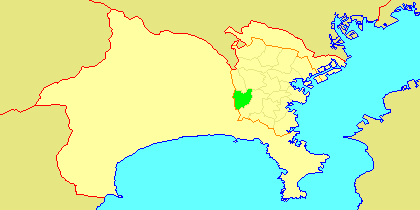
- Location of Izumi in Kanagawa
- Interactive map of Izumi
- Izumi (Japan)
- Coordinates: 35°21′52″N 139°33′15″E
- Country: Japan
- Region: Kantō
- Prefecture: Kanagawa
- City: Yokohama

Area
  - Total: 23.51 km^{2} (9.08 sq mi)

Population (February 2010)
  - Total: 155,674
  - Density: 6,620/km^{2} (17,100/sq mi)
- Time zone: UTC+9 (Japan Standard Time)
- Flower: Siberian iris
- Address: 4636-2 Izumi-chō, Izumi-ku Yokohama-shi, Kanagawa-ken; 245-0016
- Website: Izumi Ward Office

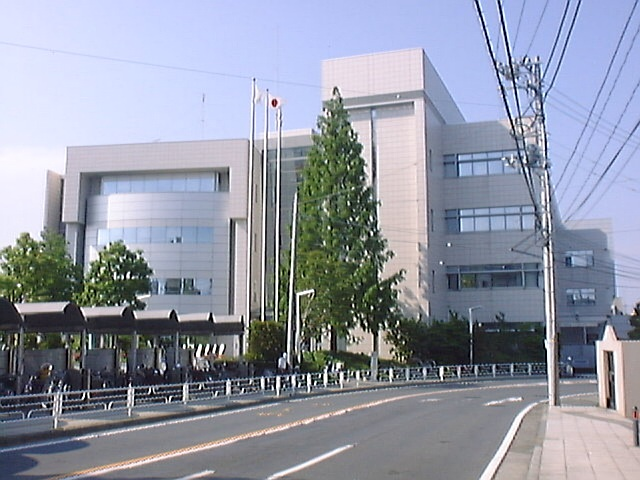
Izumi Ward Office

Izumi-ku (泉区) is one of the 18 wards of the city of Yokohama in Kanagawa Prefecture, Japan. In 2010 the ward had an estimated population of 155,674 and a density of 6,620 persons per km^{2}. The total area was 23.51 km^{2}.

== Geography ==
Izumi Ward is located in eastern Kanagawa Prefecture, and on the central-western borders of the city of Yokohama. The area is largely flatland, with scattered small hills.

=== Surrounding municipalities ===
- Kanagawa Prefecture
  - Seya-ku, Yokohama
  - Asahi-ku, Yokohama
  - Totsuka-ku, Yokohama
  - Yamato
  - Fujisawa

== History ==
The area around present-day Izumi Ward has been inhabited continuously for thousands of years. Archaeologists have found stone tools from the Japanese Paleolithic period and ceramic shards from the Jōmon period, and tombs from the Kofun period at numerous locations in the area. Under the Nara period Ritsuryō system, it became part of Kamakura and Kōza Districts in Sagami Province. In the Heian period, it was divided between shōen controlled by the Ōba clan and the Kamakura clan (of which Kamakura Gongorō Kagemasa was the most illustrious member). By the Kamakura period, much of the area was farmland supporting the population of nearby Kamakura. During the Edo period, the territory came under the control of Tokugawa Ieyasu. It was administered as tenryō territory controlled directly by the Tokugawa shogunate, but administered through various hatamoto.

After the Meiji Restoration, Izumi Ward became part of the new Kanagawa Prefecture in 1868. In the cadastral reform of April 1, 1889, the area was divided into numerous villages under Kamakura District. During the Meiji period, the area was a center for sericulture. On April 1, 1939, Izumi was annexed by the neighboring city of Yokohama, becoming part of Totsuka Ward. In a major administrative reorganization of October 1, 1969, Totsuka Ward was divided, and Izumi emerged as an independent ward within Yokohama.

== Economy ==
Izumi Ward is largely a regional commercial center and bedroom community for central Yokohama and Tokyo. In 1996, in conjunction with the San Diego-Yokohama sister city relationship, Sotetsu Real Estate Co., Ltd. developed and constructed ten imported housing units, using construction documents and building materials from the United States, with a San Diego theme and style. The project was called San Diego Street of Dreams, in total, 30 such import housing units were constructed and still remain today in Ryokuentoshi, Izumi-ku.

== Education ==
University:

- Ferris University

Kanagawa Prefectural Board of Education operates prefectural senior high schools:

- Shōyō High School
- Yokohama Ryokuen High School (formerly Ryokuen Sohgoh)
- Yokohama Shūyūkan High School

Private senior high schools:

- Shūei High School (Correspondence)

Yokohama Municipal Board of Education operates public elementary and junior high schools.

Combined elementary and junior high schools:

- Ryokuen Gakuen (緑園学園)

Junior high schools:

- Izumigaoka (泉が丘)
- Izumino (いずみ野)
- Kami-Iida (上飯田)
- Nakada (中田)
- Nakawada (中和田)
- Okazu (岡津)
- Ryoke (領家)

Additionally, Minamiseya Junior High School (南瀬谷中学校), outside of Izumi-ku, has an attendance zone including parts of Izumi-ku.

Primary schools:

- Higashi-nakada (東中田)
- Iidakita-Ichō (飯田北いちょう)
- Iseyama (伊勢山)
- Izumi (和泉)
- Izumino (いずみ野)
- Kami-Iida (上飯田)
- Kuzuno (葛野)
- Nakada (中田)
- Nakawada (中和田)
- Nakawada-minami (中和田南)
- Nishigaoka (西が岡)
- Okazu (岡津)
- Shimo-Izumi (下和泉)
- Shinbashi (新橋)

Additionally, Kamiyabe Elementary School (上矢部小学校), Seya Sakura Elementary School (瀬谷さくら小学校), and Torigaoka Elementary School (鳥が丘小学校), outside of Izumi-ku, have attendance zones including parts of Izumi-ku.

Former elementary schools

- Ryokuen-higashi (緑園東) - Merged into Ryokuen Gakuen in 2022
- Ryokuen-nishi (緑園西) - Merged into Ryokuen Gakuen in 2022

== Transportation ==
=== Railroads ===
- Sagami Railway – Izumino Line
  - Ryokuentoshi - Yayoidai - Izumino - Izumi-chūō - Yumegaoka
- Yokohama City Transportation Bureau - Blue Line
  - Odoriba –Nakada –Tateba –Shimoiida

=== Highways ===
==== Prefecture roads ====
- Kanagawa Prefectural Route 22
- Kanagawa Prefectural Route 401
- Kanagawa Prefectural Route 402

== Noted people from Izumi ==
- Yuka Kosaka, gravure idol
- Tomomi Itano, singer, gravure idol
- Mari Yaguchi, singer
- Kohei Usui, professional soccer player
- Fūka Haruna, actress
