= Shōnandai Station =

Railway and metro station in Yokohama, Japan

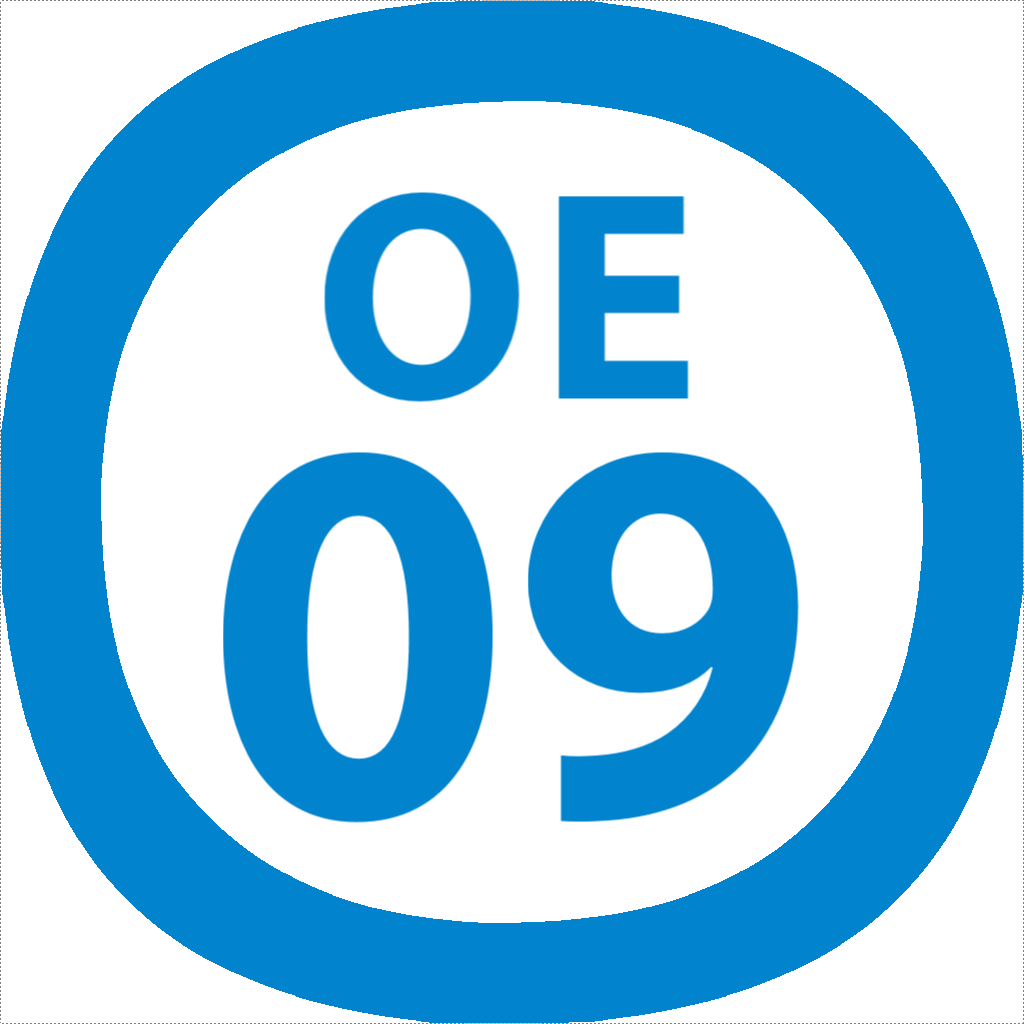
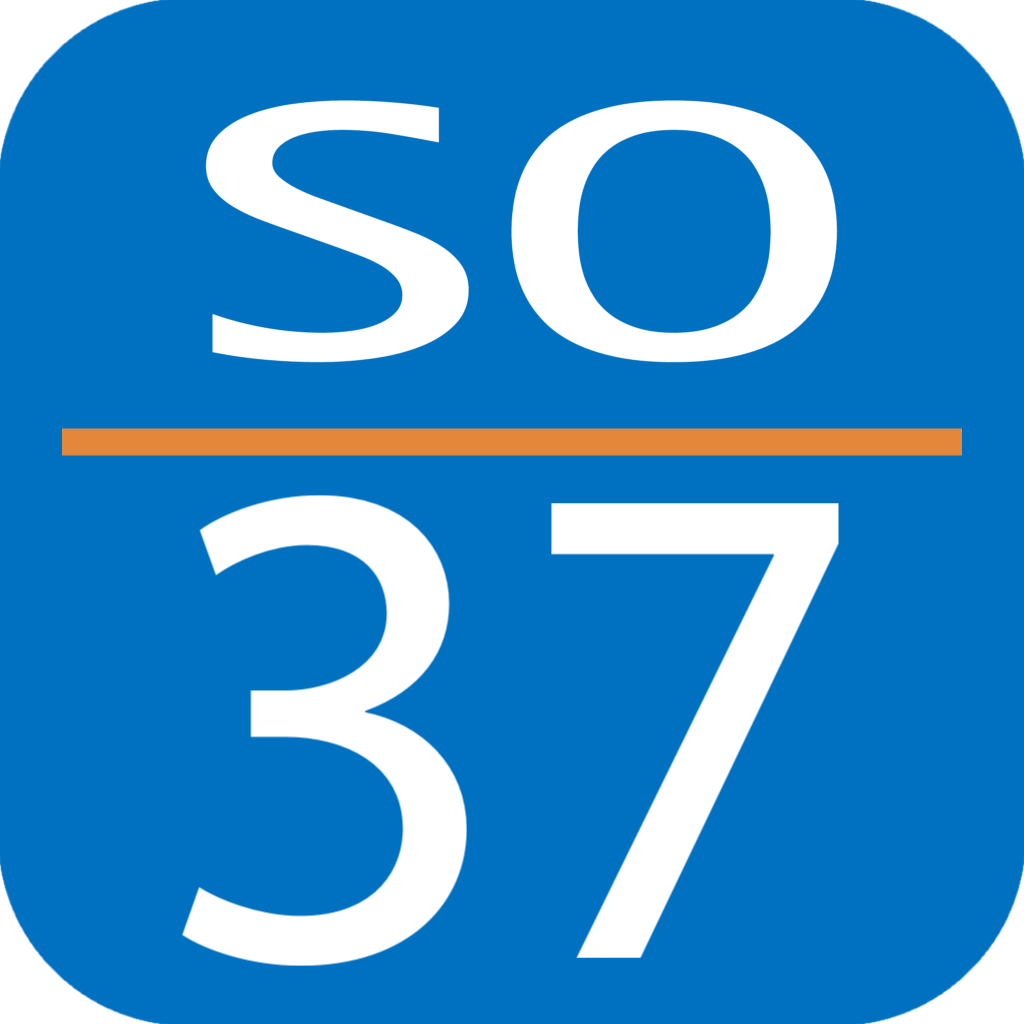
B01 Shōnandai Station 湘南台駅

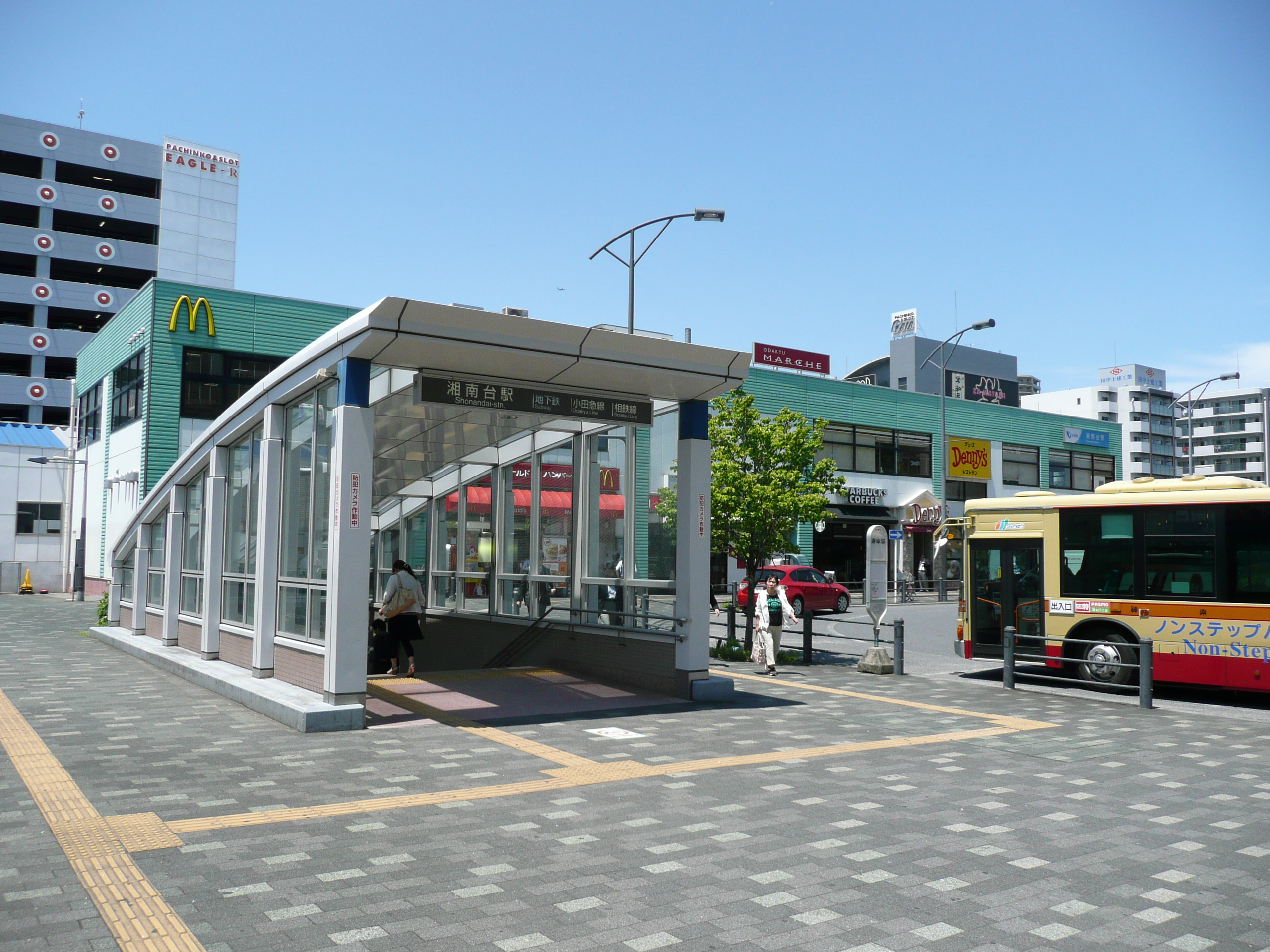
- East side of the station in May 2012

General information
- Location: 2-15 Shōnandai, Fujisawa-shi, Kanagawa-ken 252-0804; Japan
- Coordinates: 35.396185°N 139.466589°E
- Operator: Odakyu Electric Railway; Sagami Railway; Yokohama City Transportation Bureau
- Lines: Odakyu Enoshima Line; Sagami Railway Izumino Line; Blue Line
- Platforms: 2 side + 2 island platforms
- Connections: Bus stop

Other information
- Station code: B01 (Subway)

History
- Opened: 7 November 1966; 59 years ago

Passengers
- FY2019: 168,796

Services
Preceding station	Odakyu	Following station
Fujisawa Terminus	Enoshima Line Rapid Express	Yamato towards Sagami-Ōno
Fujisawa towards Katase-Enoshima	Enoshima Line Express	Chōgo towards Sagami-Ōno
Mutsuai-Nichidaimae towards Katase-Enoshima	Enoshima Line Local	Chōgo towards Sagami-Ōno
Preceding station	Sagami Railway	Following station
Terminus	Sōtetsu Izumino Line Limited Express	Izumino towards Futamata-gawa
Terminus	Sōtetsu Izumino Line Commuter Express Rapid Local	Yumegaoka towards Futamata-gawa
Preceding station	Yokohama Municipal Subway	Following station
Terminus	Blue Line Rapid Local	Shimoiida B02 towards Azamino
Location
- Location within Yokohama Location within Kanagawa Prefecture Location within Japan

Shōnandai Station (湘南台駅, Shōnandai-eki) is an interchange passenger railway station in located in the city of Fujisawa, Kanagawa, Japan, jointly operated by private railway companies Odakyu Electric Railway and Sagami Railway (Sōtetsu), and the public Yokohama City Transportation Bureau (subway service). It is 15.8 kilometers from the starting point of the Odakyū Enoshima Line at Sagami-Ōno Station and is a terminal station for both the Sagami Railway Izumino Line and the Yokohama Subway Blue Line.

The ticket gates of the three lines converge on one wide underground concourse.

== Lines ==
- Odakyu Electric Railway
  - Odakyū Enoshima Line - Rapid Express and Express trains stop at this station.
- Sagami Railway
  - Izumino Line
- Yokohama Municipal Subway
  - Blue Line (B01)

== Station layout ==
The Odakyu Enoshima Line has two elevated opposed side platforms, connected to the station building by an underpass. The Sōtetsu and Yokohama Municipal Subway stations are both underground, and each have a single island platform.

=== Odakyu platforms ===
1	Odakyū Enoshima Line	for Fujisawa and Katase-Enoshima
2	Odakyū Enoshima Line	for Yamato, Sagami-Ōno, Machida, and Shinjuku

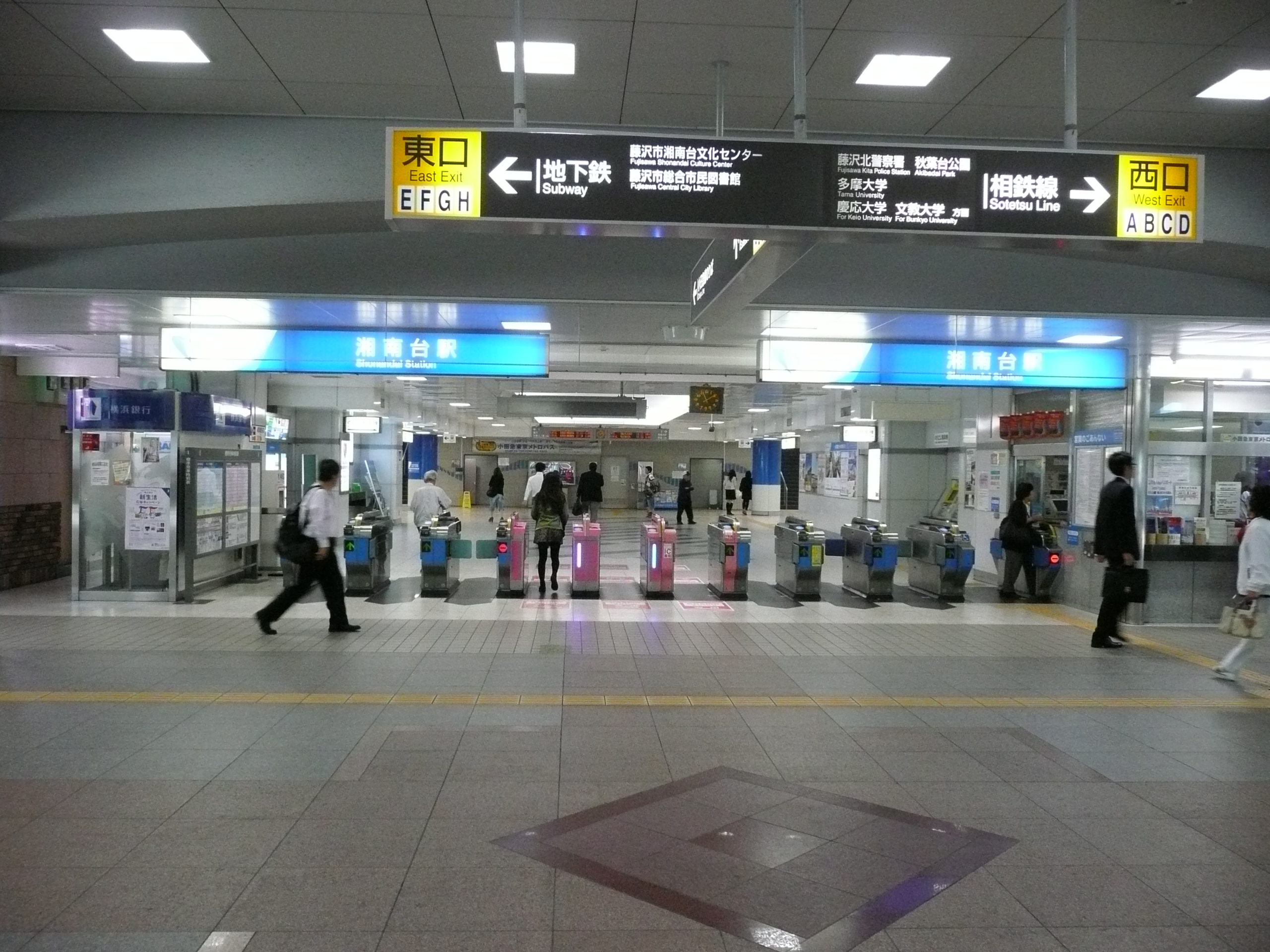
Ticket gates

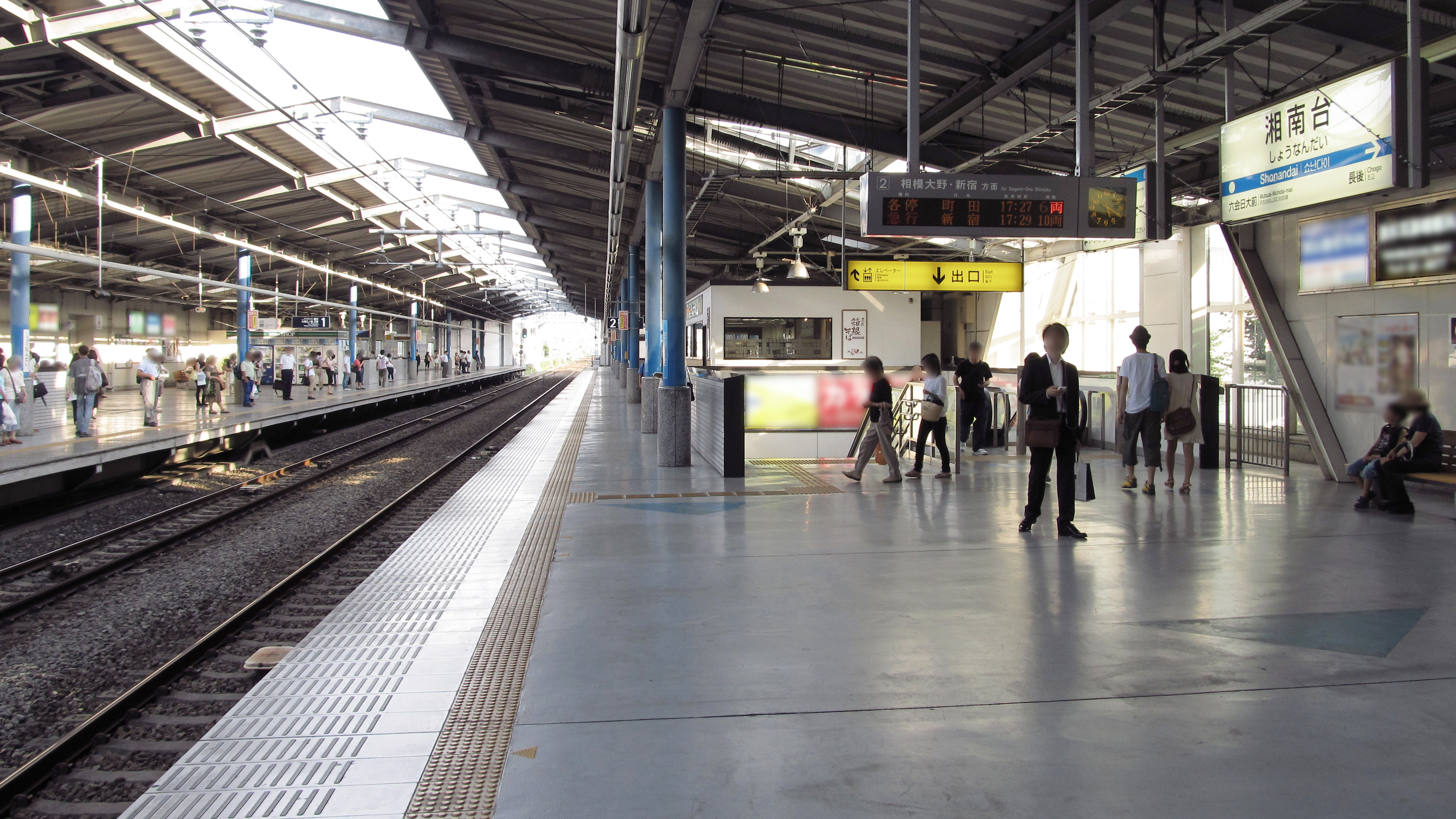
Platform

=== Sōtetsu platforms ===
1, 2	Sōtetsu Izumino Line	for Futamata-gawa, Yokohama and Shin-Yokohama

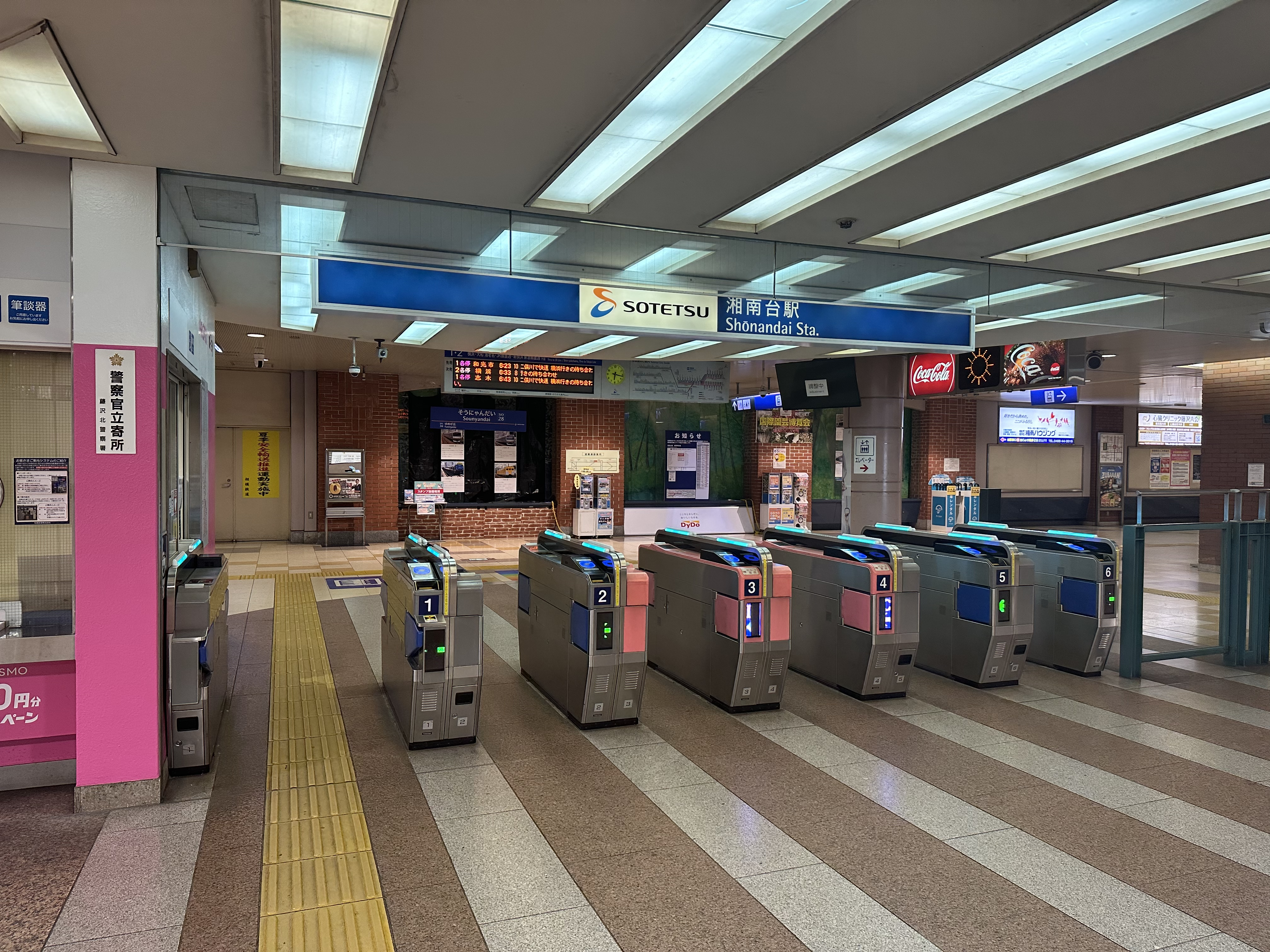
Ticket gates

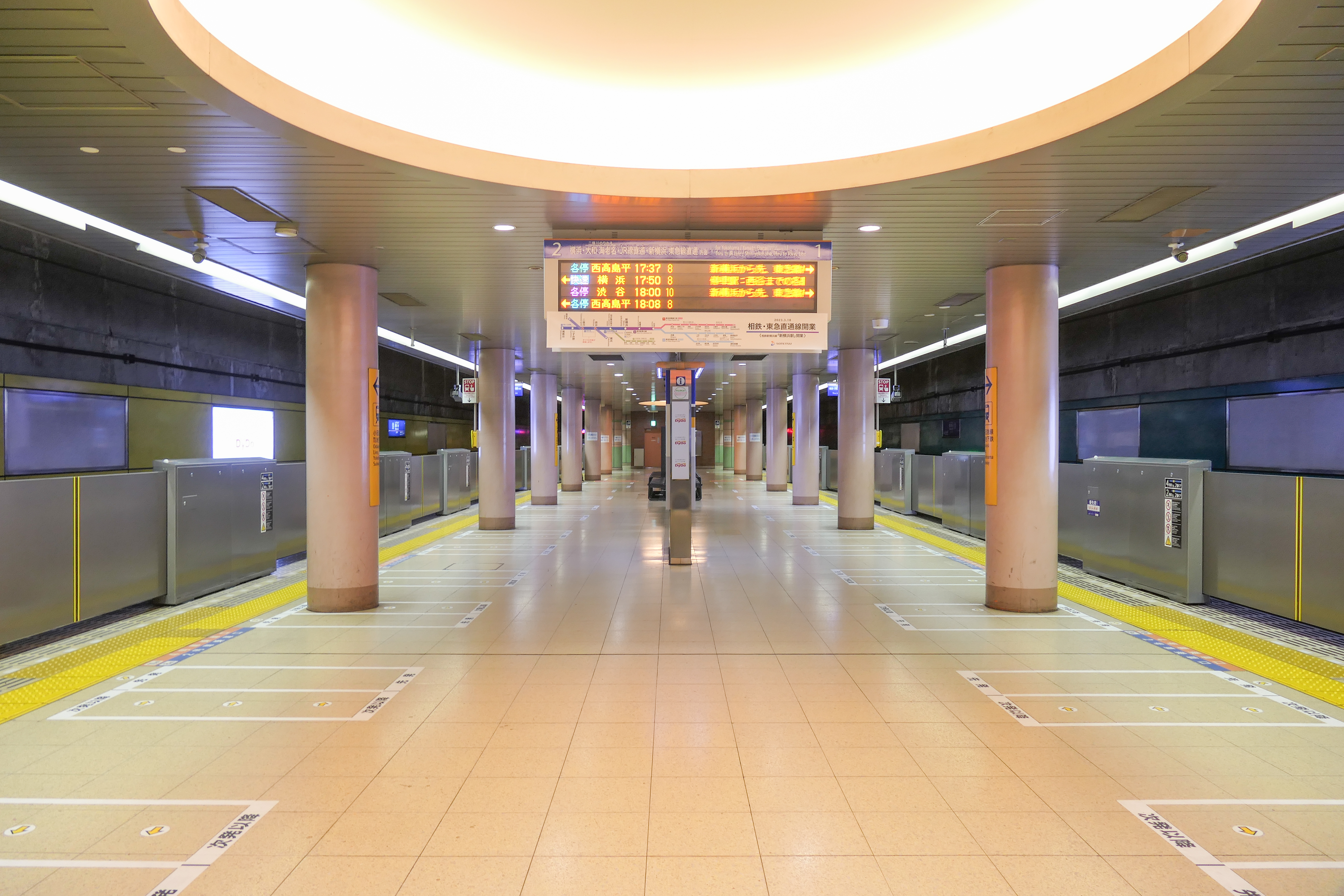
Platform

=== Yokohama Municipal Subway platforms ===
1, 2	Blue Line	for Totsuka, Kamiōoka, Yokohama, Shin-Yokohama, and Azamino

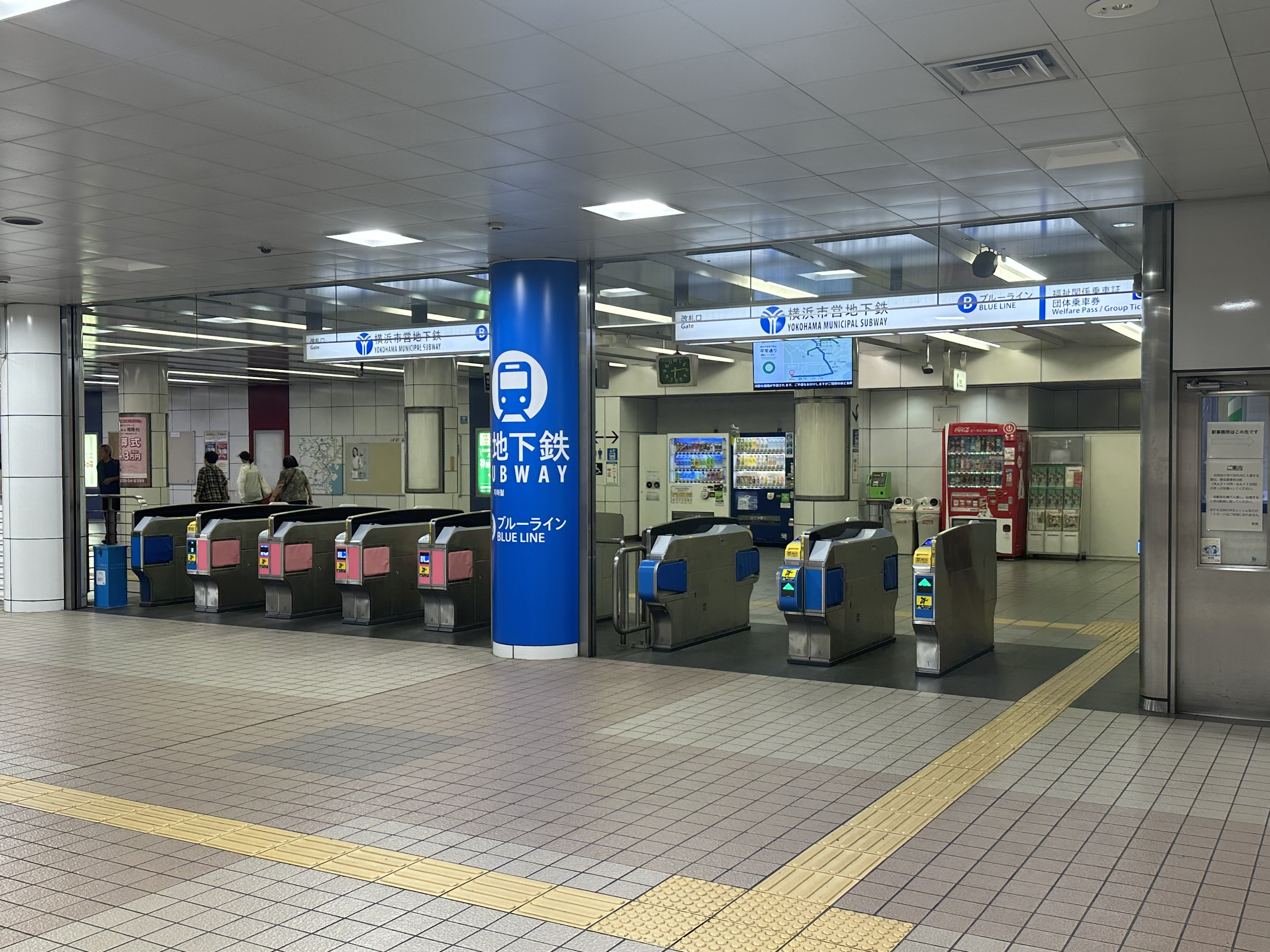
Ticket gates

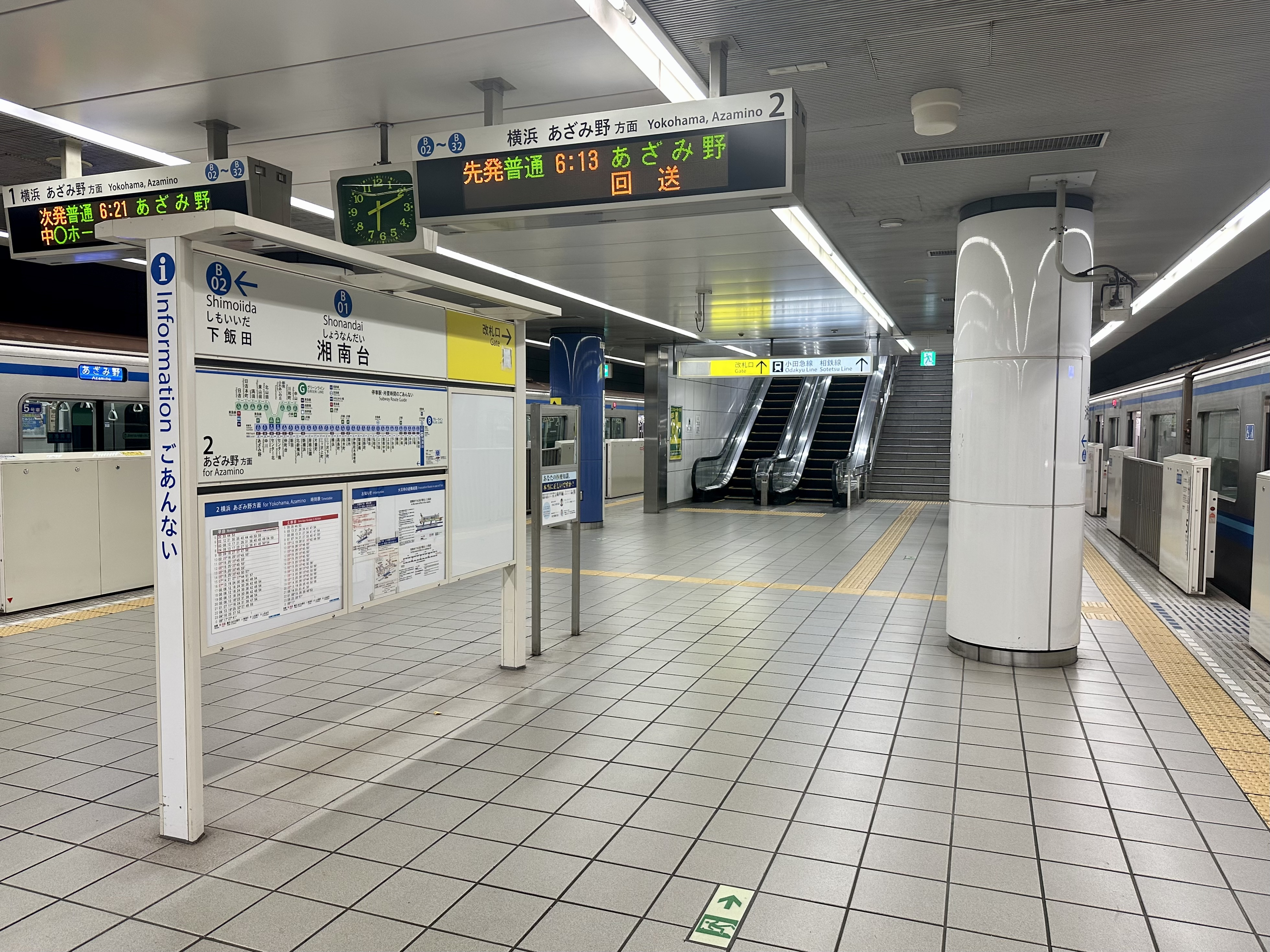
Platform

== History ==
Shōnandai Station was opened on 7 November 1966 as a station on the Odakyū Enoshima Line. The station was greatly expanded in 1999 with the addition of the Sagami Railway Izumino Line on 10 March, and the Yokohama Subway Blue Line on 29 August.

Through services to and from the Tokyu Toyoko Line courtesy of the Shin-yokohama Line began operation on 18 March 2023. Effective this date, through services originating from this station continue past Hiyoshi on the Tokyu Shin-yokohama Line towards Wakoshi on the Fukutoshin Line.

== Passenger statistics ==
In fiscal 2019, the Odakyu station was used by an average of 92,076 passengers daily. During the same fiscal year, the Sotetsu station was used by an average of 28,697 passengers daily, and the Yokohama Municipal Subway by an average of 48,023 passengers daily,

The passenger figures for previous years are as shown below.

Fiscal year	Odakyu	Sotetsu	Yokohama Subway
2005	76,247	24,440	45,235
2010	82,948	26,741	44,431
2015	90,208	27,533	47,371

== Surrounding area ==
=== Public facilities ===
- Shonandai culture center
- Akibadai cultural gymnasium
- Shonandai park
- Engyo park
- Fujisawa North police station
- Fujisawa North fire station

== See also ==
- List of railway stations in Japan
