= Futamata-gawa Station =

Railway station in Yokohama, Japan

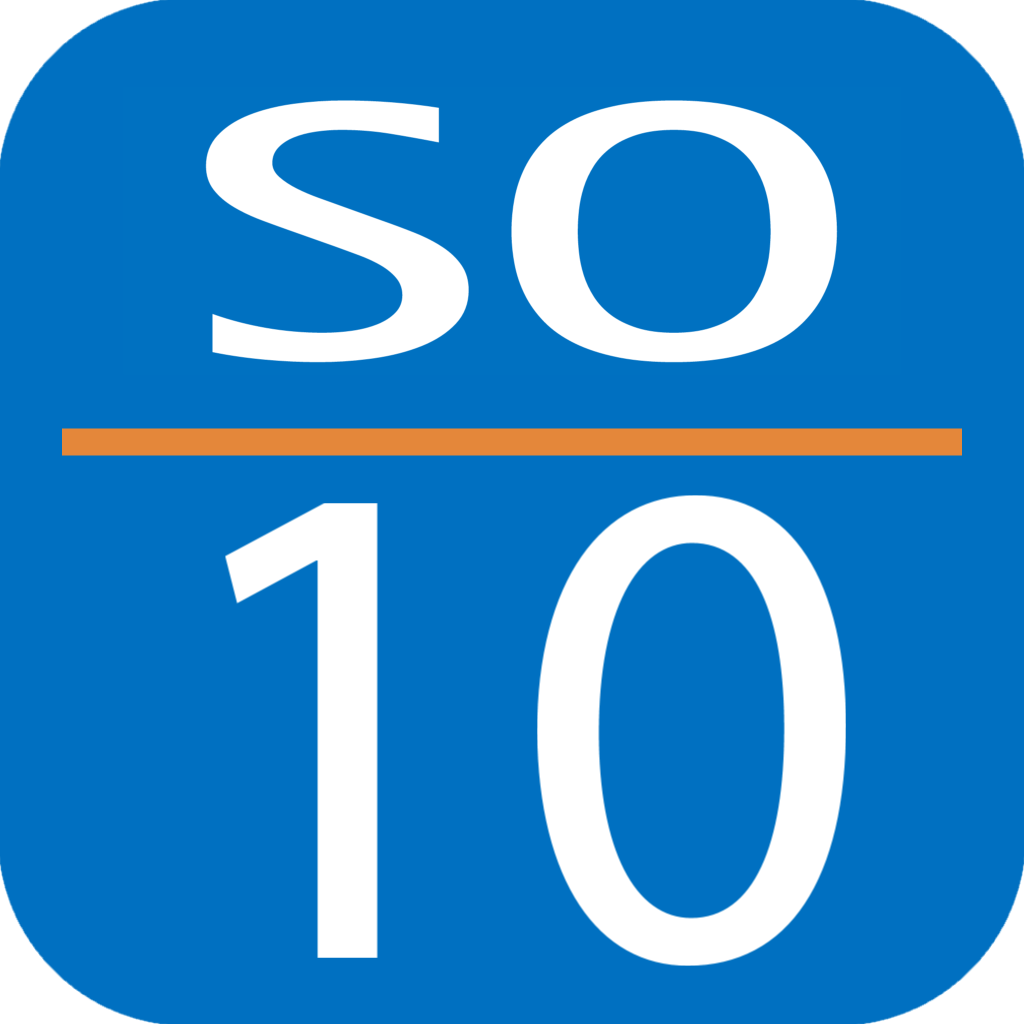
Futamata-gawa Station 二俣川駅

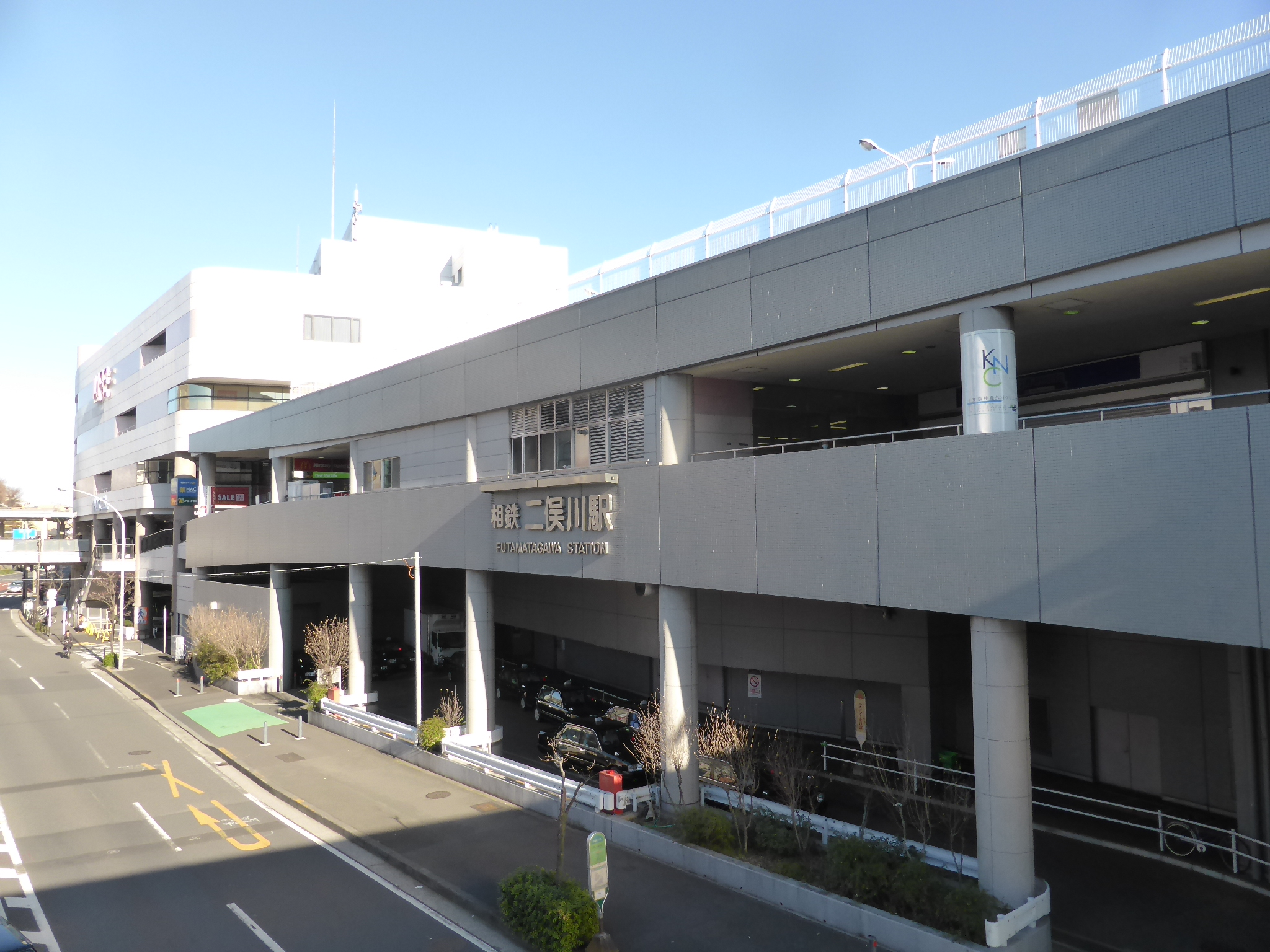
- The north entrance, January 2015

General information
- Location: Futamata-gawa, Asahi-ku, Yokohama-shi, Kanagawa-ken 241-0821; Japan
- Coordinates: 35°27′47.08″N 139°31′55.09″E
- Operator: Sagami Railway
- Lines: Sōtetsu Main Line; Sōtetsu Izumino Line
- Distance: 10.5 km from Yokohama
- Platforms: 2 island platforms

Other information
- Station code: SO10
- Website: Official website

History
- Opened: May 12, 1926

Passengers
- 2019: 82,603 daily

Services
Preceding station	Sagami Railway	Following station
Yamato towards Ebina	Sōtetsu Main Line Limited Express	Nishiya towards Yokohama
Kibōgaoka towards Ebina	Sōtetsu Main Line Commuter Express	Yokohama Terminus
Kibōgaoka towards Ebina	Sōtetsu Main Line Rapid Local	Tsurugamine towards Yokohama
Izumino towards Shōnandai	Sōtetsu Izumino Line Limited Express	through to Sotetsu Main Line
Minami-Makigahara towards Shōnandai	Sōtetsu Izumino Line Commuter Express Rapid Local	through to Sotetsu Main Line
Yamato towards Ebina	Sōtetsu–JR Link Line Limited Express	Nishiya towards Shinjuku
Kibōgaoka towards Ebina	Sōtetsu–JR Link Line Local	Tsurugamine towards Shinjuku
Location
- Location within Kanagawa Prefecture Location within Japan

Futamata-gawa Station (二俣川駅, Futamata-gawa eki) is a junction passenger railway station located in Asahi-ku, Yokohama, Kanagawa Prefecture, Japan, operated by the private railway operator Sagami Railway (Sotetsu).

== Lines ==
Futamata-gawa Station is served by the Sōtetsu Main Line and Sōtetsu Izumino Line. It lies 10.5 km from the terminus of the Sōtetsu Main Line at Yokohama Station, and is the terminus for the Izumino Line.

== Station layout ==
The station consists of two island platforms serving four tracks.

=== Platforms ===
1	Sōtetsu Main Line	for Yamato and Ebina
2	Sōtetsu Main Line	for Yamato and Ebina
2	Sōtetsu Izumino Line	for Shōnandai
3-4	Sōtetsu Main Line	for Nishiya, Yokohama, Hazawa yokohama-kokudai and Shin-Yokohama; Through to Saikyō Line for Musashi-Kosugi, Ōsaki, and Shinjuku; Through to Tōkyū Shin-yokohama Line for Shin-tsunashima and Hiyoshi

- Platform 3 is used mostly by trains from the Izumino Line, and platform 4 is used mostly by trains from the Main Line.
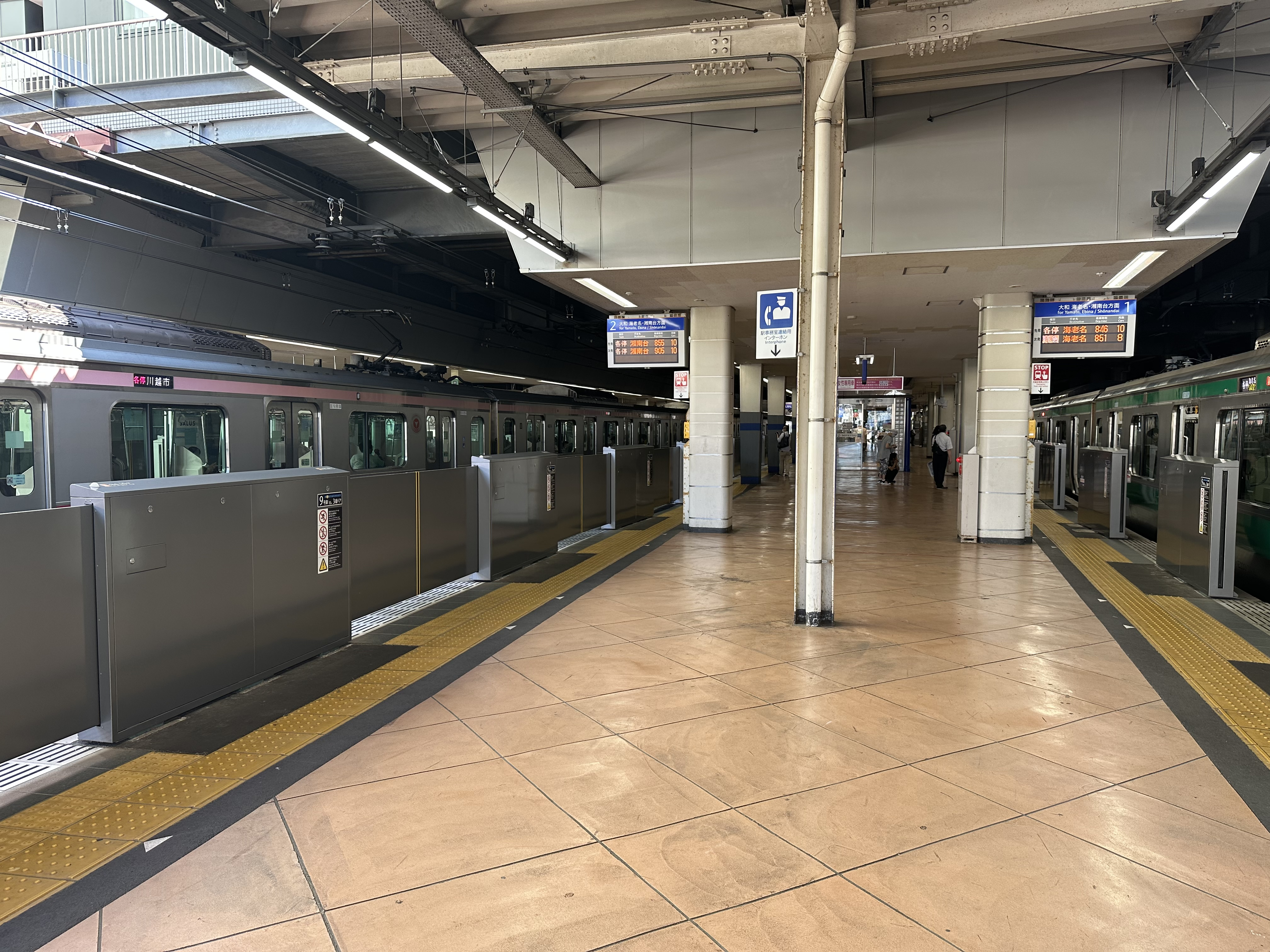
The platforms, July 2023

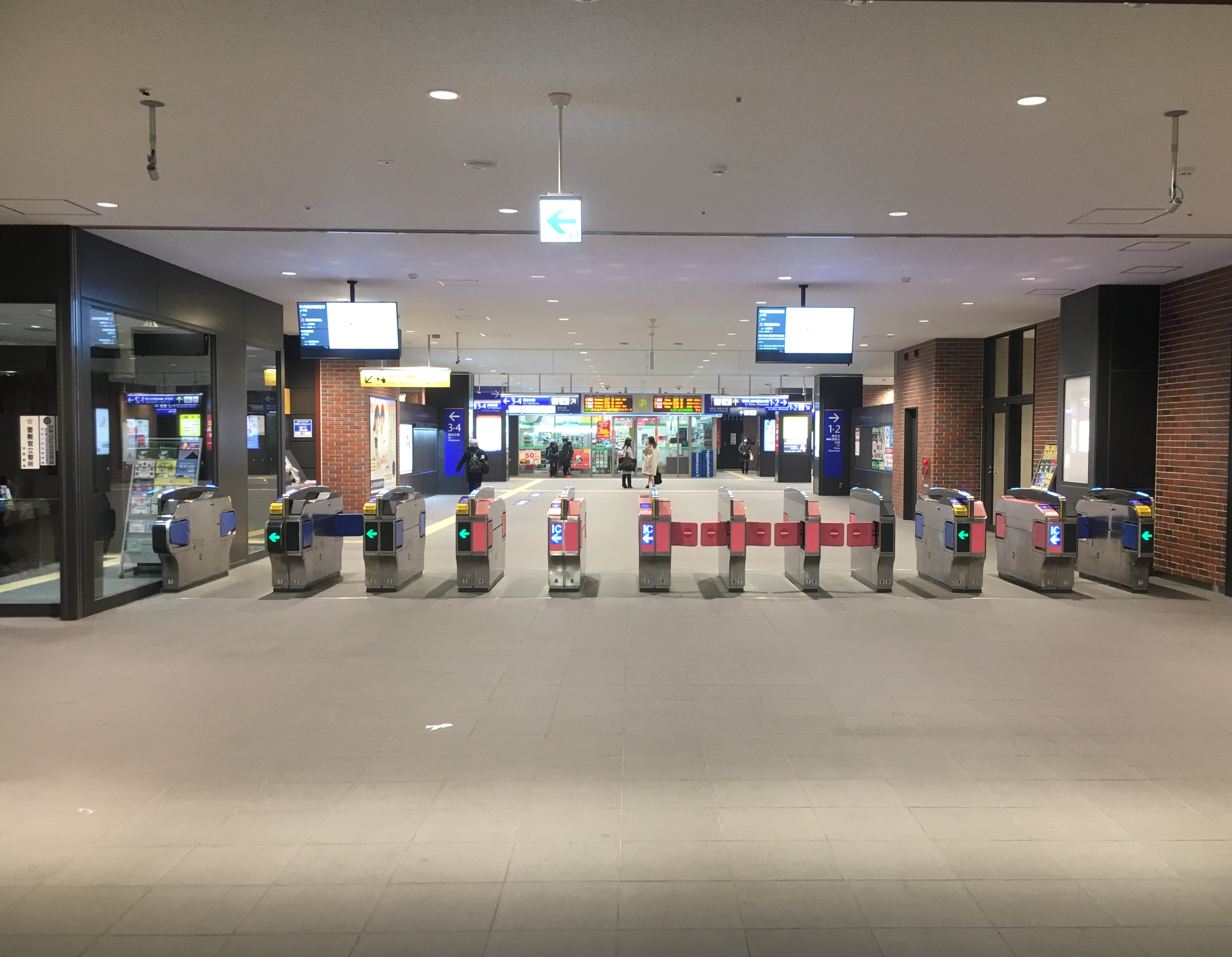
The station concourse, February 2019

== History ==
Futamata-gawa Station opened on May 12, 1926. The Izumino Line opened on April 8, 1976.

== Passenger statistics ==
In fiscal 2019, the station was used by an average of 82,603 passengers daily.

The passenger figures for previous years are as shown below.

Fiscal year	daily average
2005	78,009
2010	80,329
2015	77,843

== Surrounding area ==
- Kanagawa Prefectural Police Driver License Center
- Kanagawa Prefectural Archives
- Kanagawa Cancer Center
- Kanagawa Prefectural Futamata River Nursing and Welfare High School
- Kanagawa Prefectural Industrial Technology Junior College
- Yokohama Fujimigaoka Gakuen Secondary School

== See also ==
- List of railway stations in Japan
