= Kamoi Station =

Railway station in Yokohama, Japan

JH18 Kamoi Station 鴨居駅
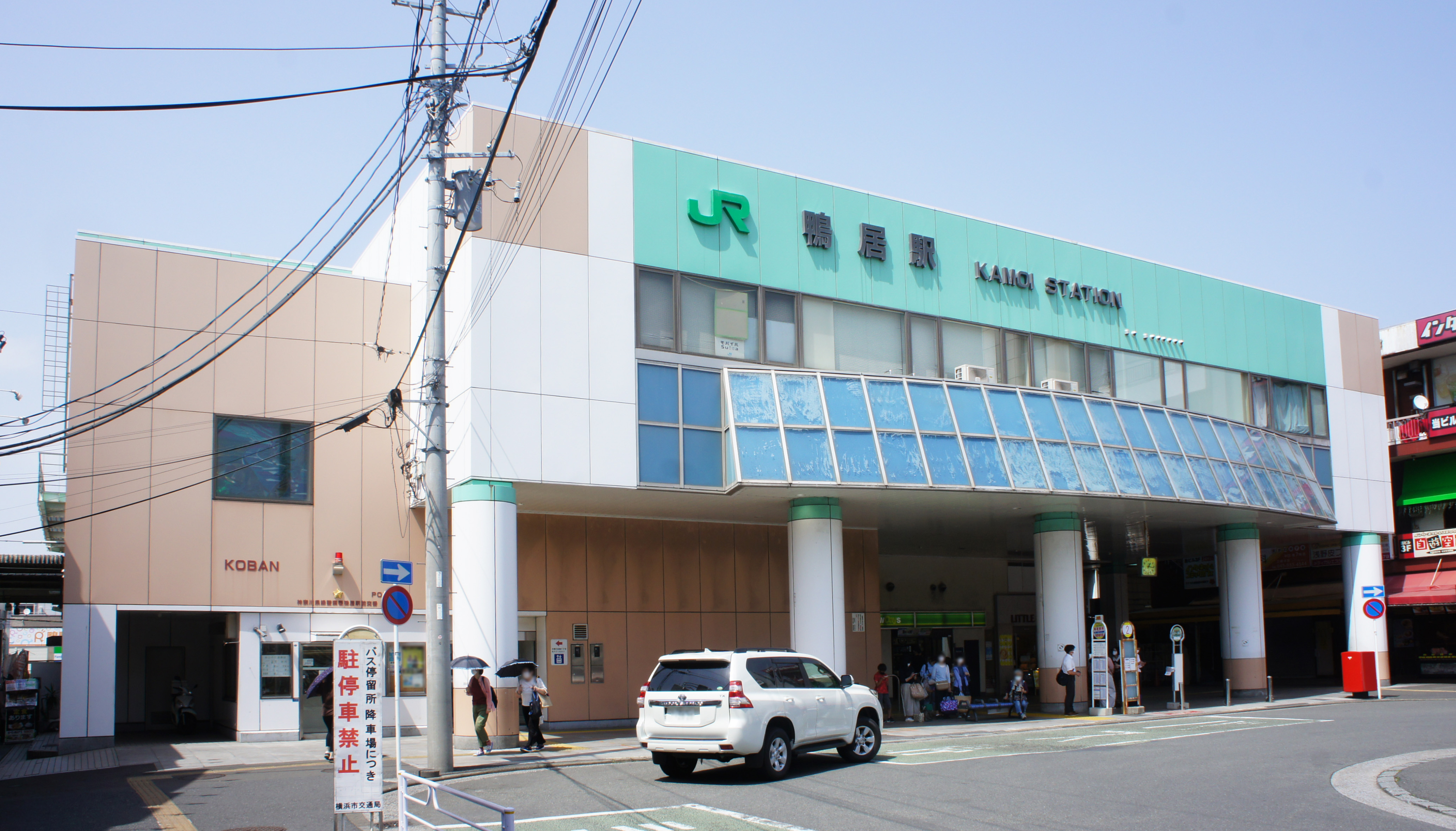
- Kamoi Station South Exit, May 2021

General information
- Location: Kamoi-cho 1-8-14, Midori-ku, Yokohama-shi, Kanagawa-ken 226-0003; Japan
- Coordinates: 35°30′39.1″N 139°34′1.5″E
- Operator: JR East
- Line: Yokohama Line
- Distance: 10.9 km from Higashi-Kanagawa
- Platforms: 1 island platform

Other information
- Status: Staffed (Midori no Madoguchi )
- Station code: JH18
- Website: Official website

History
- Opened: 25 December 1962

Passengers
- FY2019: 39,588 daily

Services
Preceding station	JR East	Following station
Nakayama JH19 towards Hachiōji	Yokohama Line Rapid	Shin-Yokohama JH16 towards Higashi-Kanagawa or Ōfuna
Nakayama JH19 towards Hachiōji	Yokohama Line Local	Kozukue JH17 towards Higashi-Kanagawa or Ōfuna
Location
- Location within Kanagawa Prefecture Location within Japan

Kamoi Station (鴨居駅, Kamoi-eki) is a passenger railway station located in Midori-ku, Yokohama, Kanagawa Prefecture, Japan, operated by the East Japan Railway Company (JR East).

== Lines ==
Kamoi Station is served by the Yokohama Line from Higashi-Kanagawa to Hachiōji, and is 10.9 km from the official starting point of the line at Higashi-Kanagawa. Many services continue west of Higashi-Kanagawa via the Negishi Line to Sakuragicho during the offpeak, and to Ōfuna during the morning peak.

== Station layout ==
The station consists of a single island platform serving two elevated tracks with the station building underneath. The station has a Midori no Madoguchi staffed ticket office.

=== Platforms ===
1	Yokohama Line	for Machida, Hashimoto and Hachioji
2	Yokohama Line	for Higashi-Kanagawa, Yokohama, Sakuragicho, and Ōfuna

== History ==
Kamoi Station was opened on 25 December 1962 as a station on the Japanese National Railways (JNR). With the privatization of the JNR on 1 April 1987, the station came under the operational control of JR East. A new station building was completed in 1998.

Station numbering was introduced on 20 August 2016 with Kamoi being assigned station number JH18.

== Passenger statistics ==
In fiscal 2019, the station was used by an average of 39,588 passengers daily (boarding passengers only).

The passenger figures (boarding passengers only) for previous years are as shown below.

Fiscal year	daily average
2005	33,765
2010	38,294
2015	39,479

== Surrounding area ==
- Yokohama City Kamoi Elementary School
- Yokohama City Kamoi Junior High School
- Yokohama City Higashikamoi Junior High School
- Kanagawa Prefectural Hakusan High School
- Kanagawa Women's High Security Detention Facility.

== See also ==
- List of railway stations in Japan
