= Kita Shin-Yokohama Station =

Metro station in Yokohama, Japan

Coordinates: 35°31′9″N 139°36′46″E

B26 Kita Shin-Yokohama Station 北新横浜駅
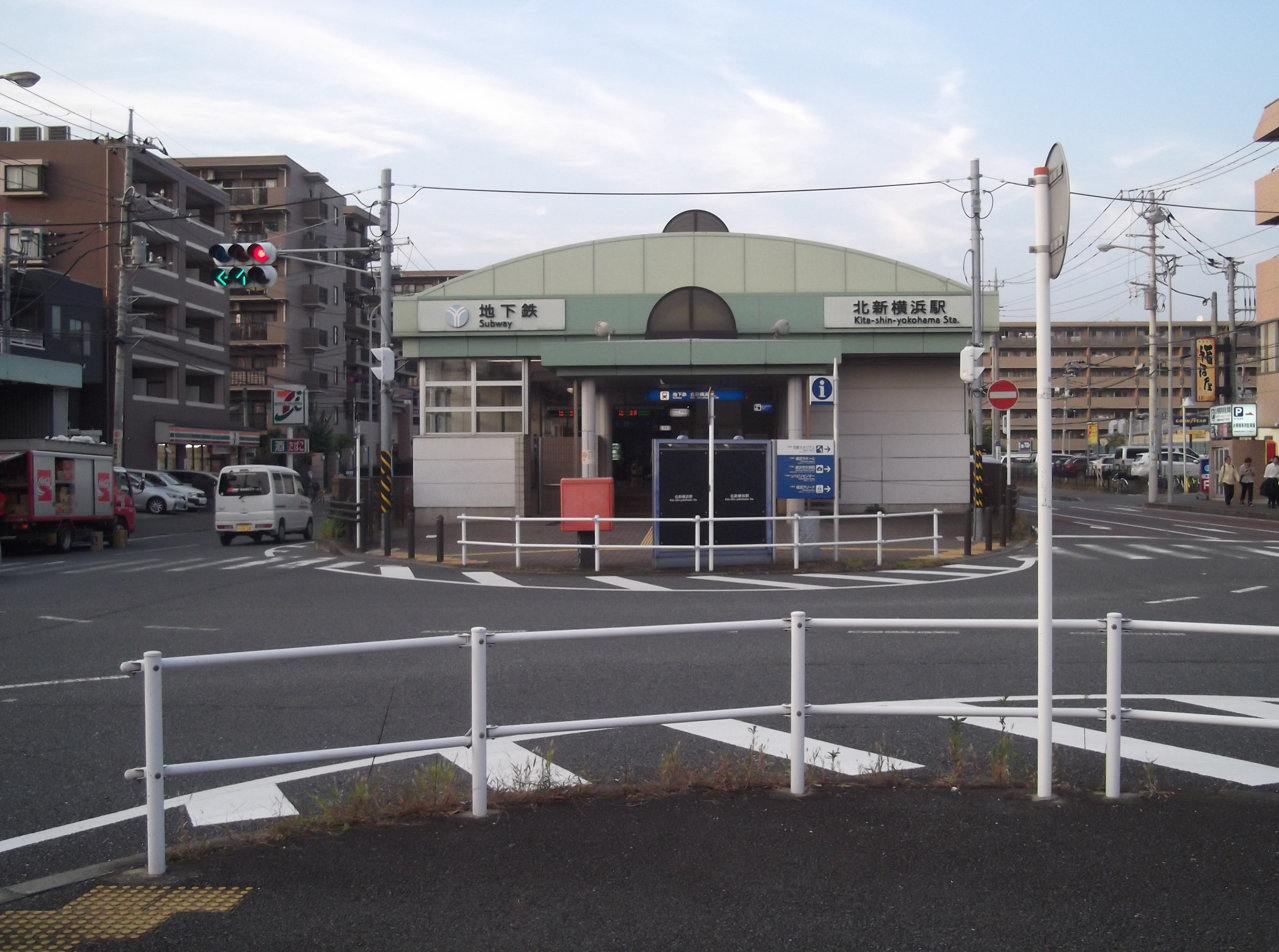
- Kita Shin-Yokohama Station in October 2015

General information
- Location: 1-539-1 Kita Shin-Yokohama, Kōhoku-ku, Yokohama, Kanagawa （横浜市港北区北新横浜一丁目539-1） Japan
- System: Yokohama Municipal Subway station
- Operator: Yokohama City Transportation Bureau
- Line: Blue Line
- Platforms: 1 island platform
- Tracks: 2
- Connections: Bus stop

Other information
- Station code: B26

History
- Opened: 18 March 1993; 33 years ago
- Former names: Shin-Yokohama Kita (until 1999)

Passengers
- FY2008: 5,233 daily

Services
Preceding station	Yokohama Municipal Subway	Following station
Shin-Yokohama B25 towards Shonandai	Blue Line Local	Nippa B27 towards Azamino
Location
- Location within Yokohama Location within Kanagawa Prefecture Location within Japan

Kita Shin-Yokohama Station (北新横浜駅, Kita Shin-yokohama-eki) is a subway station on the Blue Line (Line 3) in Kōhoku-ku, Yokohama, Kanagawa Prefecture, Japan, operated by the Yokohama Municipal Subway.

== Lines ==
Kita Shin-Yokohama Station is served by the Yokohama Municipal Subway Blue Line, and lies 30.8 km (19.1 mi) from the terminus of the line at Shōnandai Station.

== Station layout ==
The station has a single island platform serving two tracks.

=== Platforms ===
1	■ Blue Line	for Shin-Yokohama, Yokohama, Totsuka, and Shōnandai
2	■ Blue Line	for Azamino

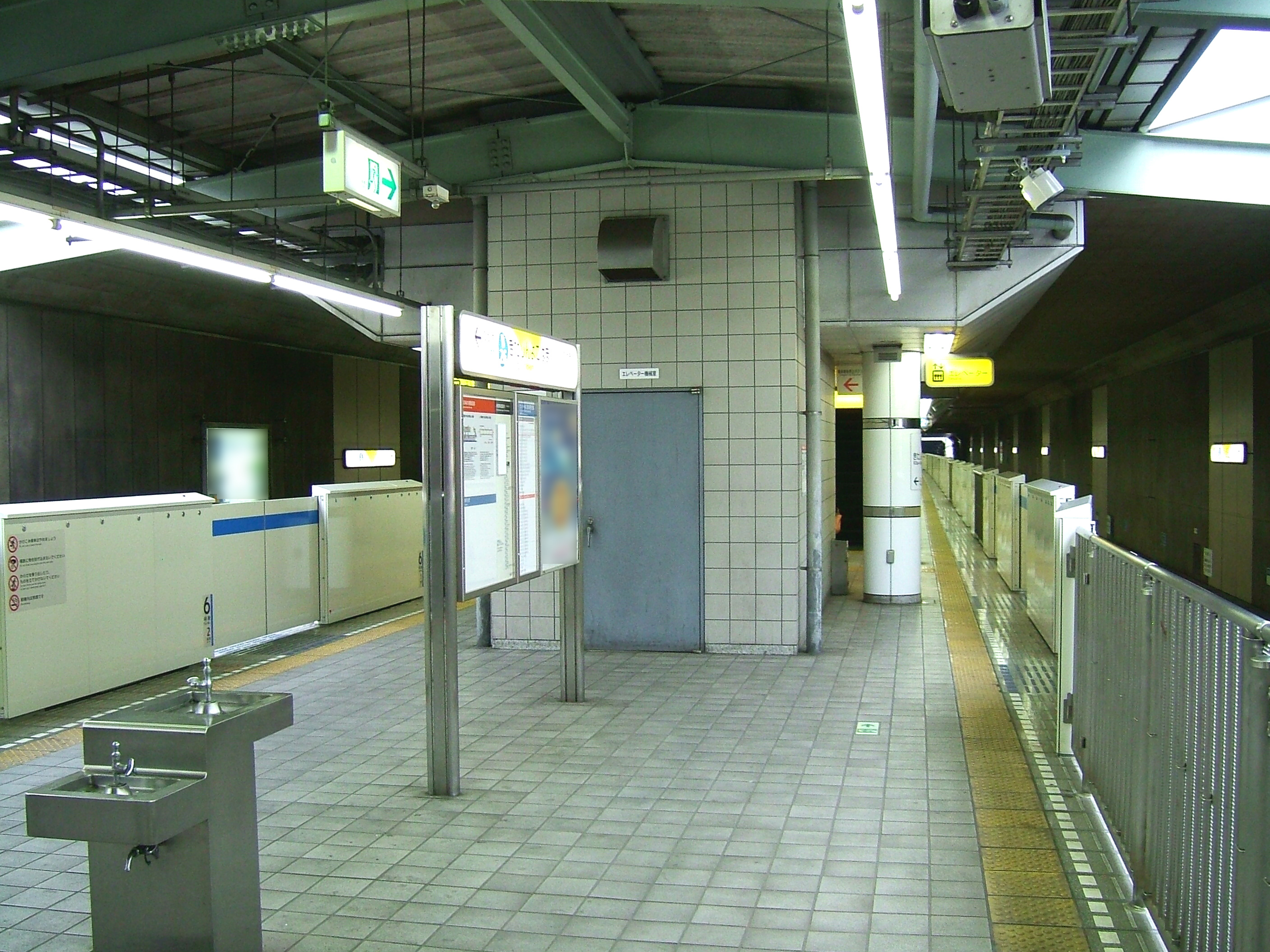
Platform

== History ==
The station opened on 18 March 1993, as Shin-Yokohama Kita Station (新横浜北駅i). It was renamed Kita Shin-Yokohama Station on 29 August 1999. Platform screen doors were installed in April 2007.

== See also ==
- List of railway stations in Japan
