= Shin-Yokohama Station =

Major railway and metro station in Yokohama, Japan

Coordinates: 35°30′27″N 139°37′03″E

JH16 B25 Shin-Yokohama Station 新横浜駅

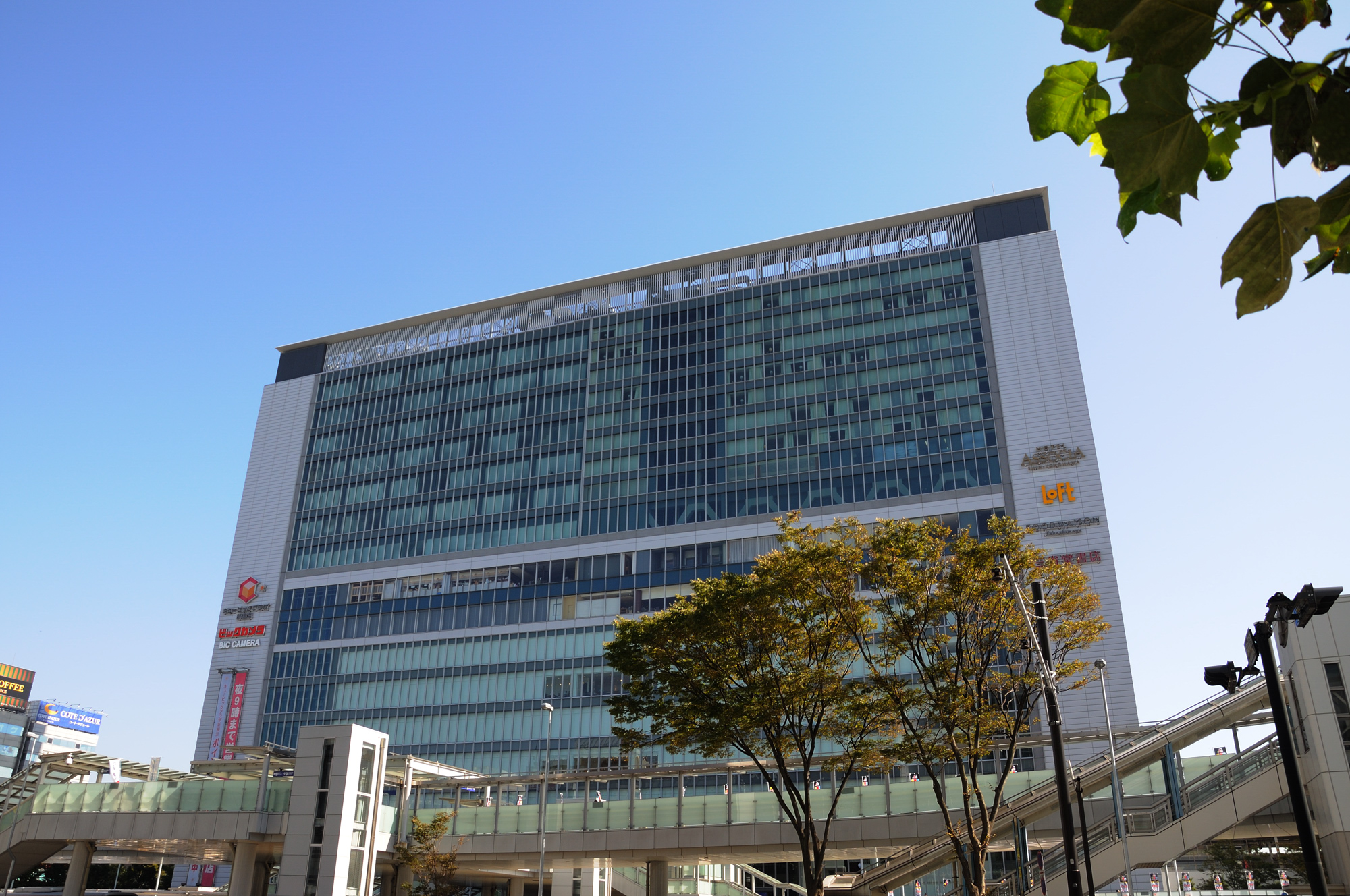
- The main station building and forecourt in October 2012

Japanese name
- Shinjitai: 新横浜駅
- Kyūjitai: 新橫濱驛
- Hiragana: しんよこはまえき

General information
- Location: Shinohara-chō, Kōhoku Ward, Yokohama City, Kanagawa Prefecture; Japan
- Operator: JR Central; JR East; Sagami Railway; Tōkyū Railways; Yokohama Municipal Subway
- Lines: Tōkaidō Shinkansen; Yokohama Line; Sōtetsu Shin-yokohama Line; Tōkyū Shin-Yokohama Line; Blue Line
- Connections: Bus terminal

History
- Opened: October 1, 1964; 61 years ago

Passengers
- FY 2023: 68,047 daily (JR Central); 102,884 daily (JR East); 53,414 daily (Sotetsu); 71,470 daily (Tokyu); 70,002 daily (Yokohama Subway)

Services
Preceding station	JR Central	Following station
Nagoya towards Shin-Ōsaka	Tōkaidō Shinkansen Nozomi	Shinagawa towards Tokyo
Odawara towards Shin-Ōsaka	Tōkaidō Shinkansen Hikari Kodama	Shinagawa towards Tokyo
Other services
Preceding station	JR East	Following station
Kamoi JH18 towards Hachiōji	Yokohama Line Rapid	Kikuna JH15 towards Higashi-Kanagawa or Ōfuna
Kozukue JH17 towards Hachiōji	Yokohama Line Local	Kikuna JH15 towards Higashi-Kanagawa or Ōfuna
Preceding station	Sagami Railway	Following station
Hazawa yokohama-kokudai towards Nishiya	Sōtetsu Shin-Yokohama Line	through to Tōkyū
Preceding station	Tōkyū Railways	Following station
through to Sōtetsu	Tōkyū Shin-Yokohama Line	Shin-tsunashima towards Hiyoshi
Preceding station	Yokohama Municipal Subway	Following station
Yokohama B20 towards Shonandai	Blue Line Rapid	Nippa B27 towards Azamino
Kishine-kōen B24 towards Shonandai	Blue Line Local	Kita Shin-Yokohama B26 towards Azamino
Location
- Location within Yokohama Location within Kanagawa Prefecture Location within Tokyo Bay and Bōsō Peninsula Location within Kanto Area Location within Japan

Shin-Yokohama Station (Note: JR capitalizes the "y" in "Shin-Yokohama"; the rest of the rail operators decapitalize the "y" and spell it as "Shin-yokohama".) (新横浜駅, Shin-yokohama-eki; lit. 'New Yokohama Station') is a major interchange railway station in Yokohama, Japan, jointly operated by Central Japan Railway Company (JR Central), East Japan Railway Company (JR East), Yokohama City Transportation Bureau, Sagami Railway (Sotetsu), and Tokyu Railways (Tokyu).

== Lines ==
Shin-Yokohama Station is served by the Tōkaidō Shinkansen, Yokohama Line, Yokohama Municipal Subway Blue Line, Sōtetsu Shin-Yokohama Line, and the Tōkyū Shin-Yokohama Line.

== Station layout ==
The JR station consists of an island platform at ground level serving the Yokohama Line, with two elevated island platforms for the shinkansen tracks overhead. The shinkansen platforms 2 and 3 have safety fences, as some trains passed non-stop through the station prior to 2008. The JR Central portion of the station includes a Midori no Madoguchi staffed ticket office. Additionally, the JR East portion of the station includes reserved seat ticket vending machines.

The Municipal Subway, Tōkyū Railways and Sagami Railway (Sōtetsu) share an underground integral concourse, which forms a cross shape. The Municipal Subway owns the northwest to southeast corridor, which provides three separate sets of ticket gates, with the northwest (so-called the "Nissan Stadium ticket gate") and central paid areas providing elevators for barrier-free access to the subway Blue Line platform level which is one story below the underground concourse. The Sōtetsu-Tōkyū parts of the concourse lie directly below and align with the Yokohama Ring Road 2. The northeast concourse is managed by Tōkyū, while the southwest is managed by Sōtetsu. The platform level of Sōtetsu–Tōkyū Link Line is three stories below the integral concourse. Only the southwest concourse managed by Sōtetsu has elevators for the Sōtetsu–Tōkyū platform level. Exits 1 and 5A on the southern side of the concourse are closer to the JR concourse.

=== JR platforms ===
1,2	Tōkaidō Shinkansen	for Tokyo
3,4	Tōkaidō Shinkansen	for Nagoya, Shin-Osaka, and Hakata
5	Yokohama Line	for Kikuna, Higashi-Kanagawa,Yokohama, and Ōfuna
6	Yokohama Line	for Machida and Hachiōji

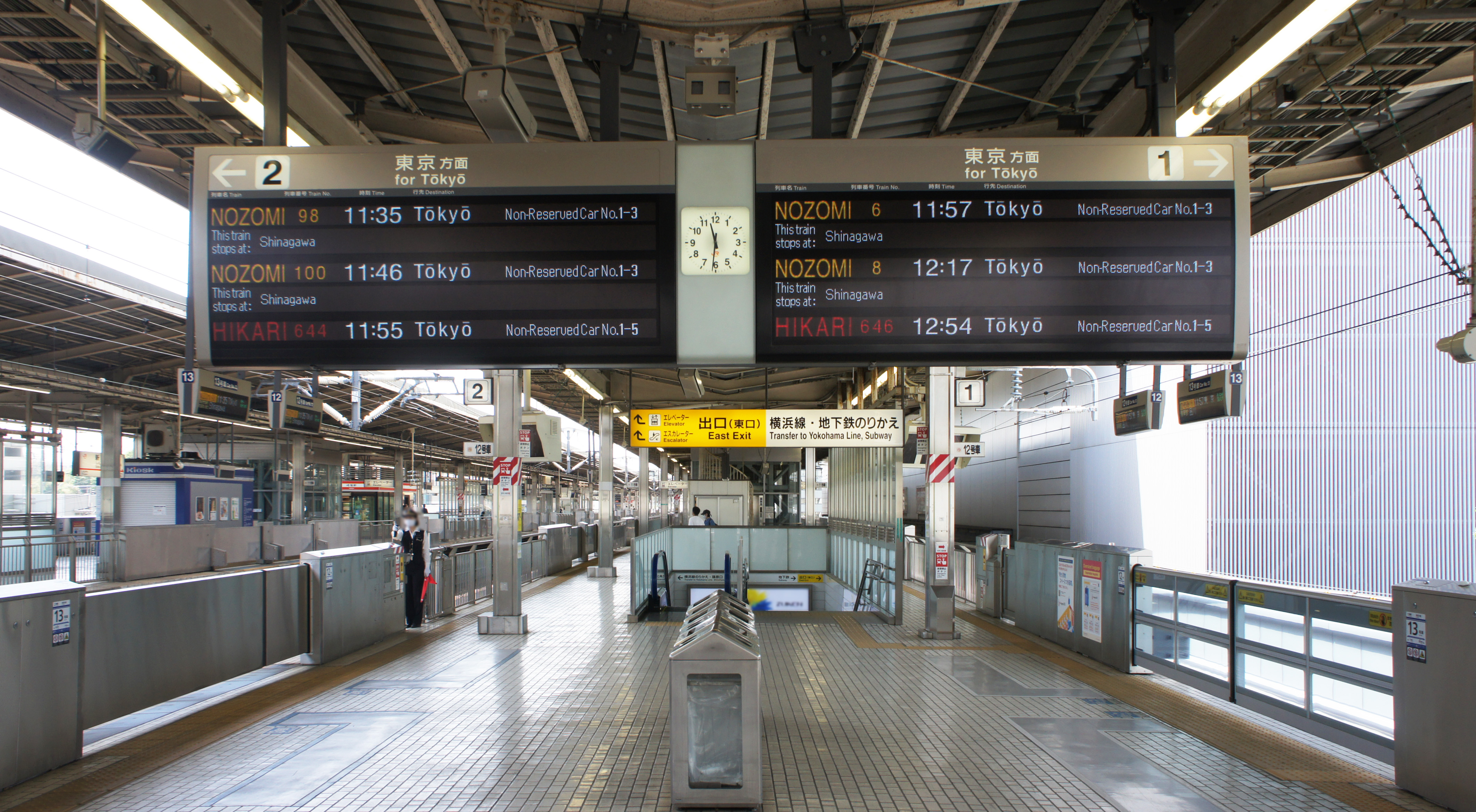
Platforms 1 and 2

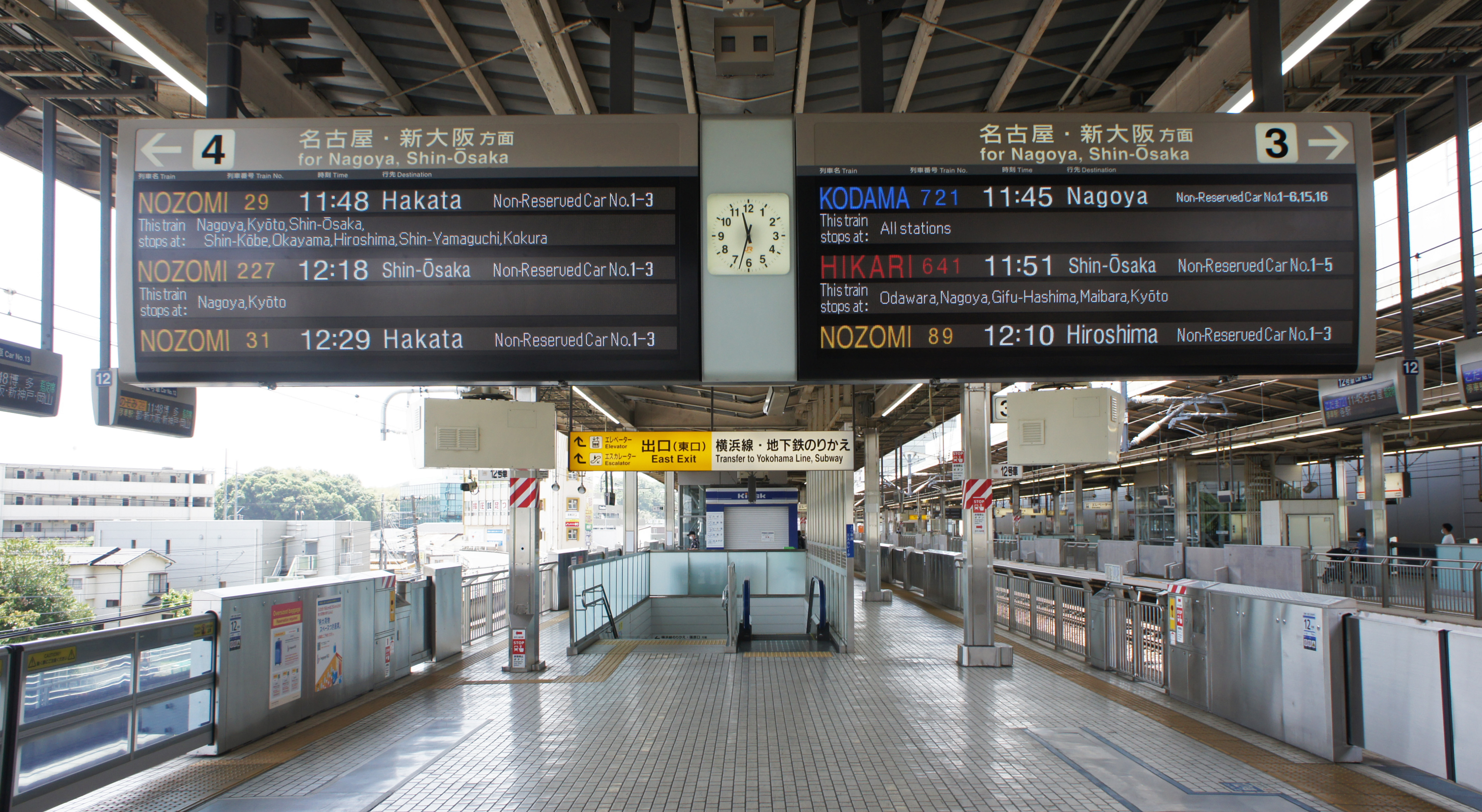
Platforms 3 and 4

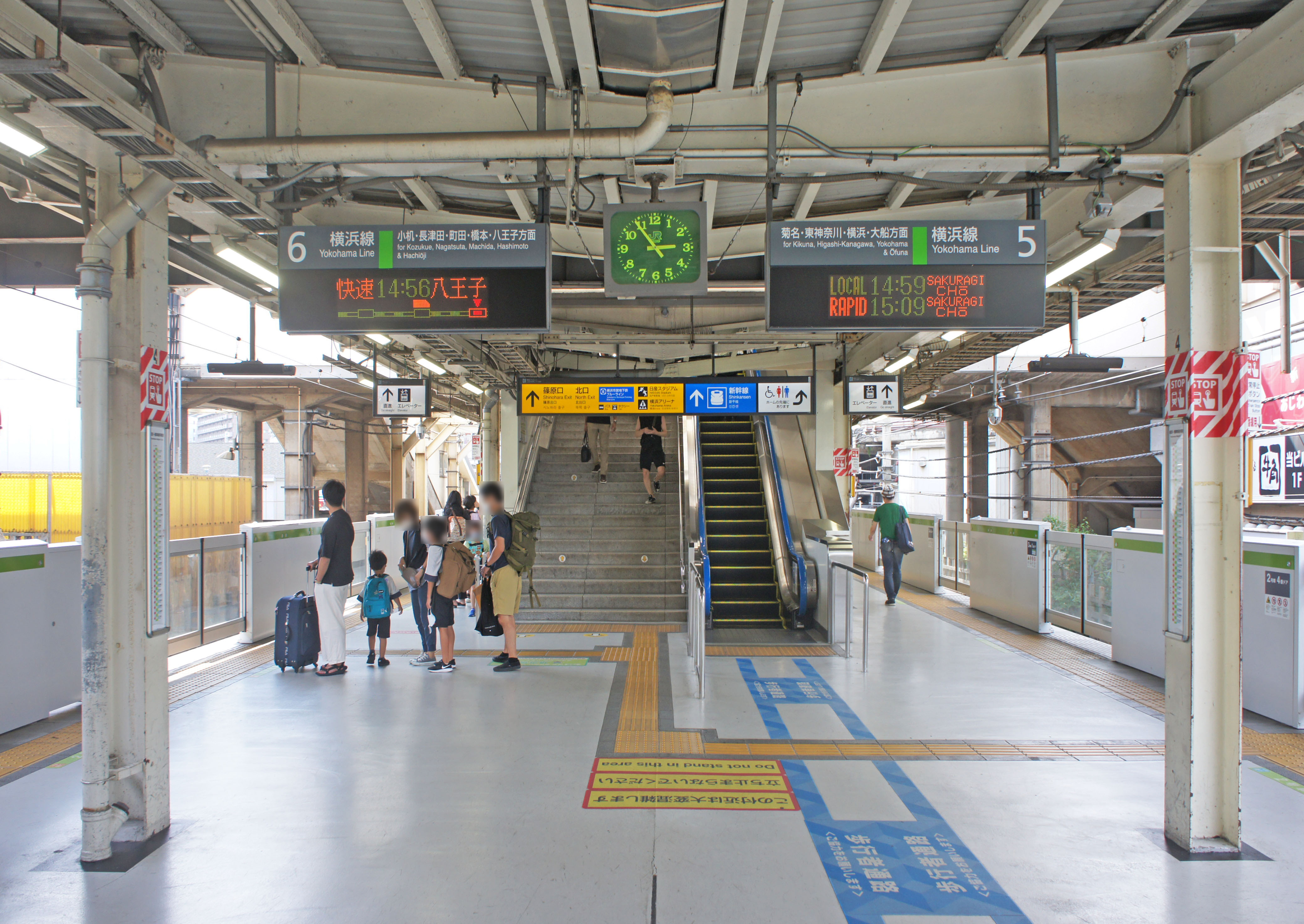
Platforms 5 and 6

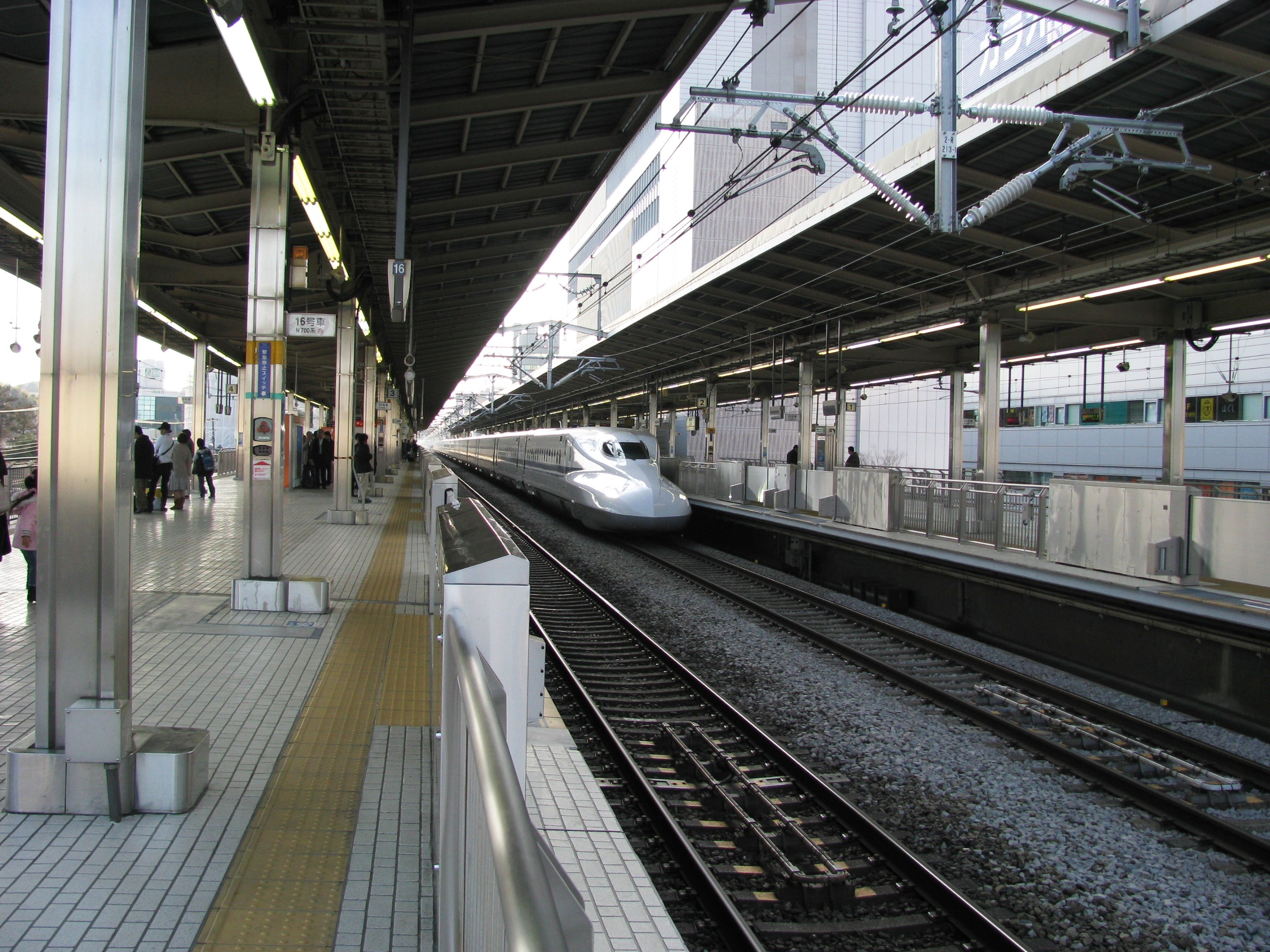
View of the Shinkansen platforms from the eastern end of platforms 3 and 4 in February 2011

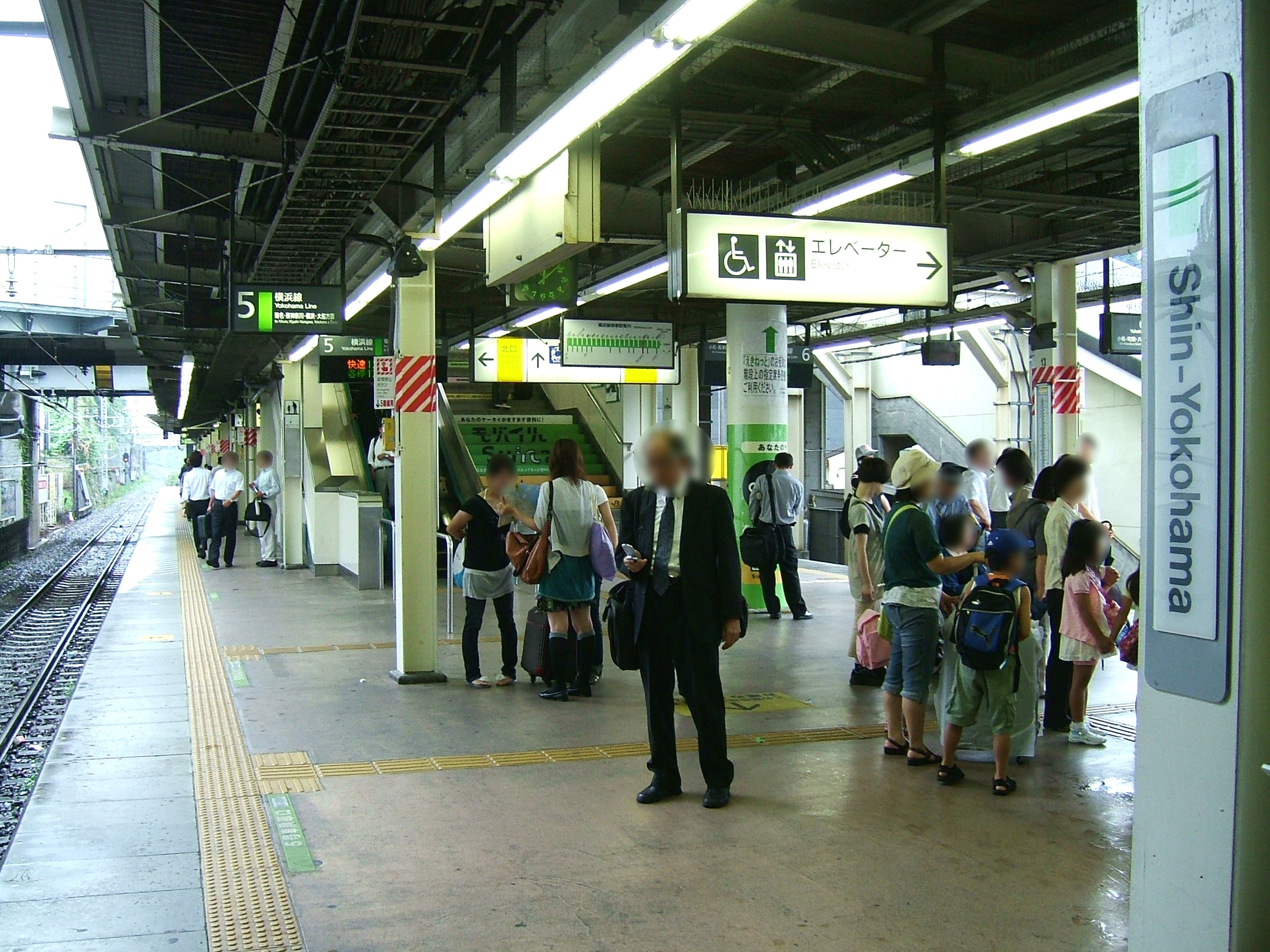
The Yokohama Line platforms, August 2008

=== Yokohama Municipal Subway platforms ===
1	Blue Line	for Yokohama, Kannai, Kami-Ōoka, Totsuka, and Shōnandai
2	Blue Line	for Azamino

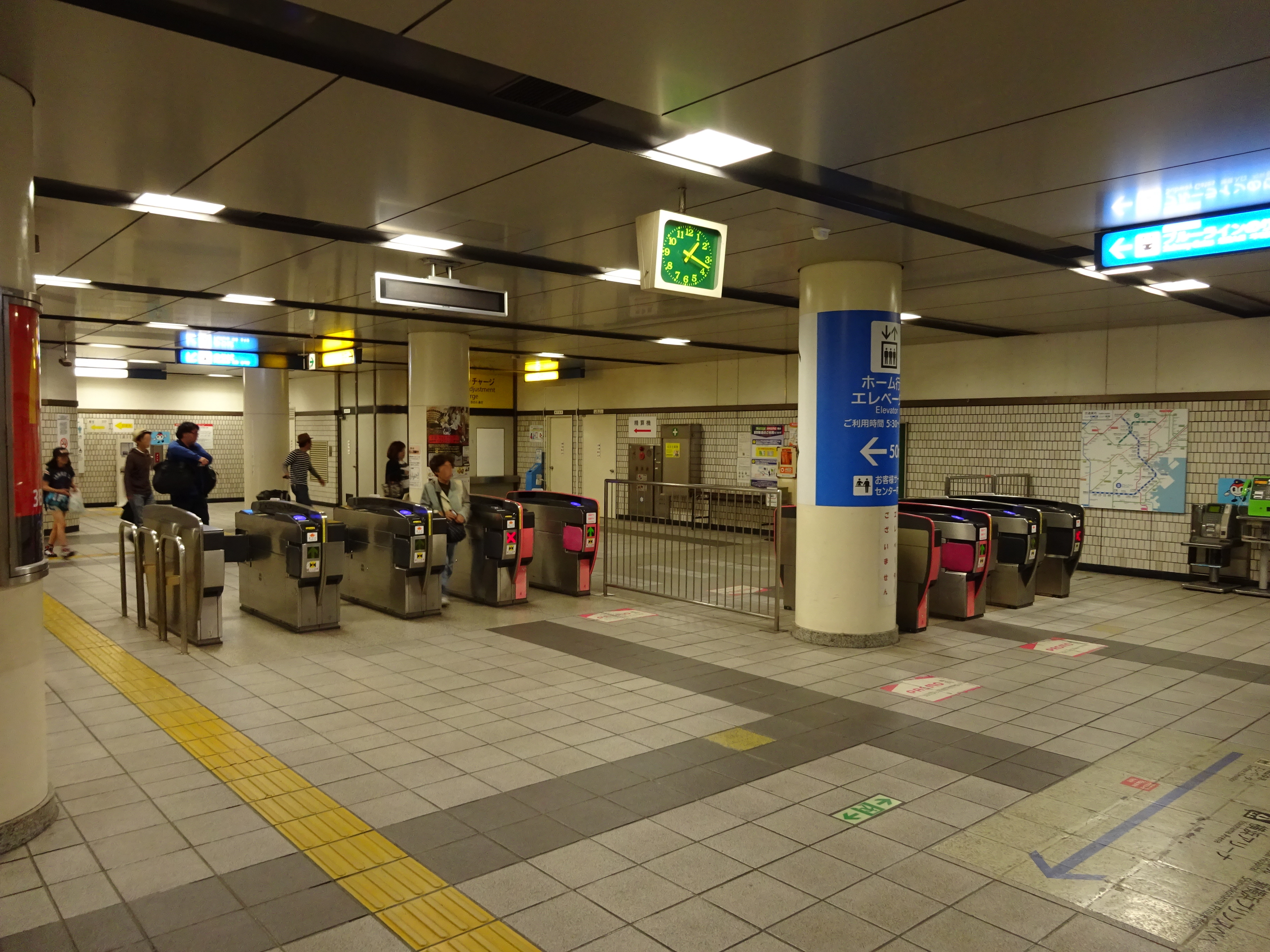
Ticket gates

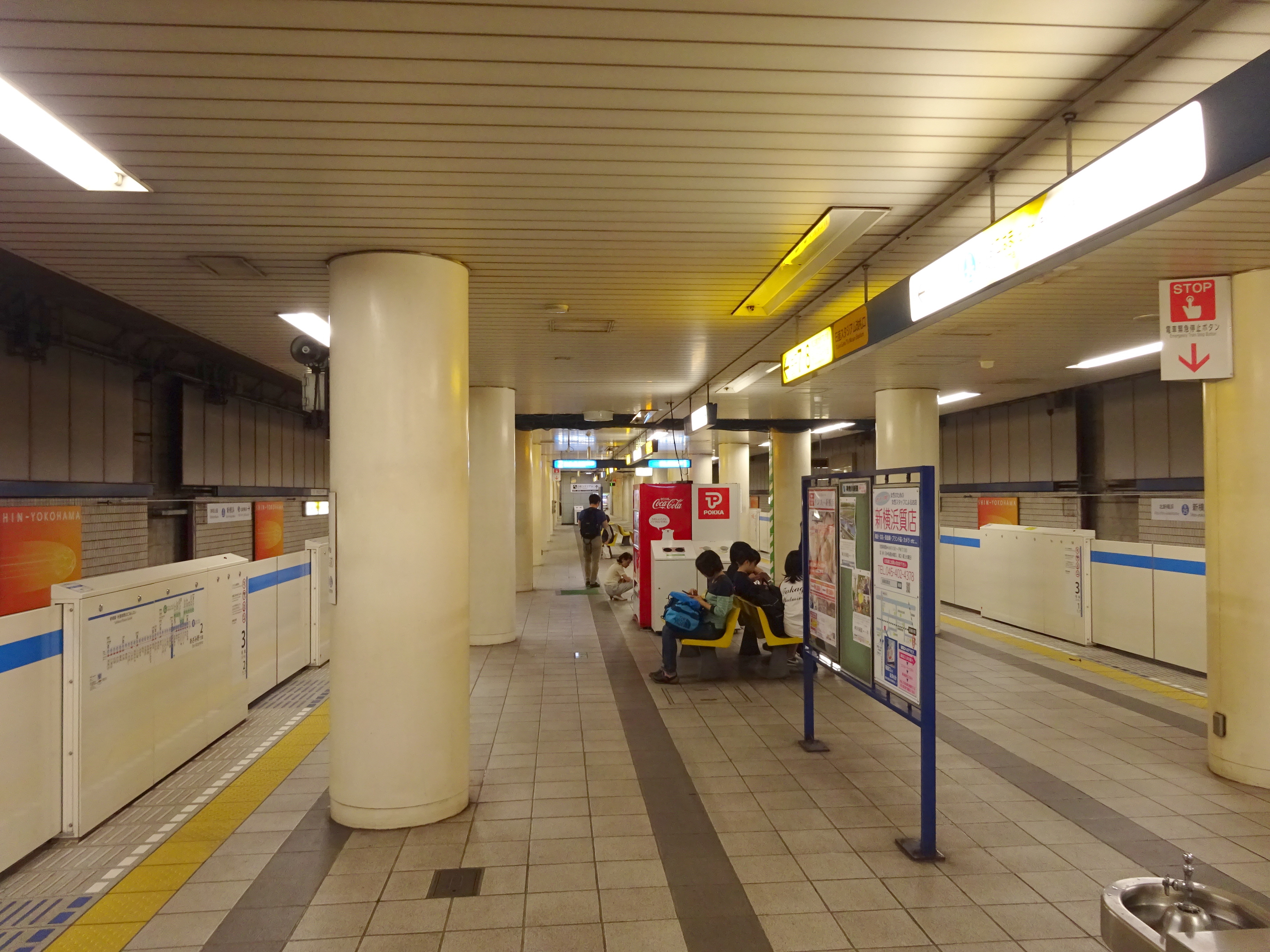
Platform

=== Sōtetsu–Tōkyū Link Line platforms ===
1,2	Sōtetsu Shin-yokohama Line	for Hazawa yokohama-kokudai and Nishiya, through service for Futamata-gawa, Yamato, Ebina and Shōnandai
3,4	Tōkyū Shin-yokohama Line	for Shin-tsunashima and Hiyoshi, through service for Shibuya, Ikebukuro, Meguro, Akabane-iwabuchi, Urawa-misono, Nishi-takashimadaira, etc.

Platforms 2 and 3 share the same track which is primarily for southbound trains which terminate at this station or emergency docking. On weekdays only, 1 midnight train departs from platform no.1 for Musashi-Kosugi.

== History ==
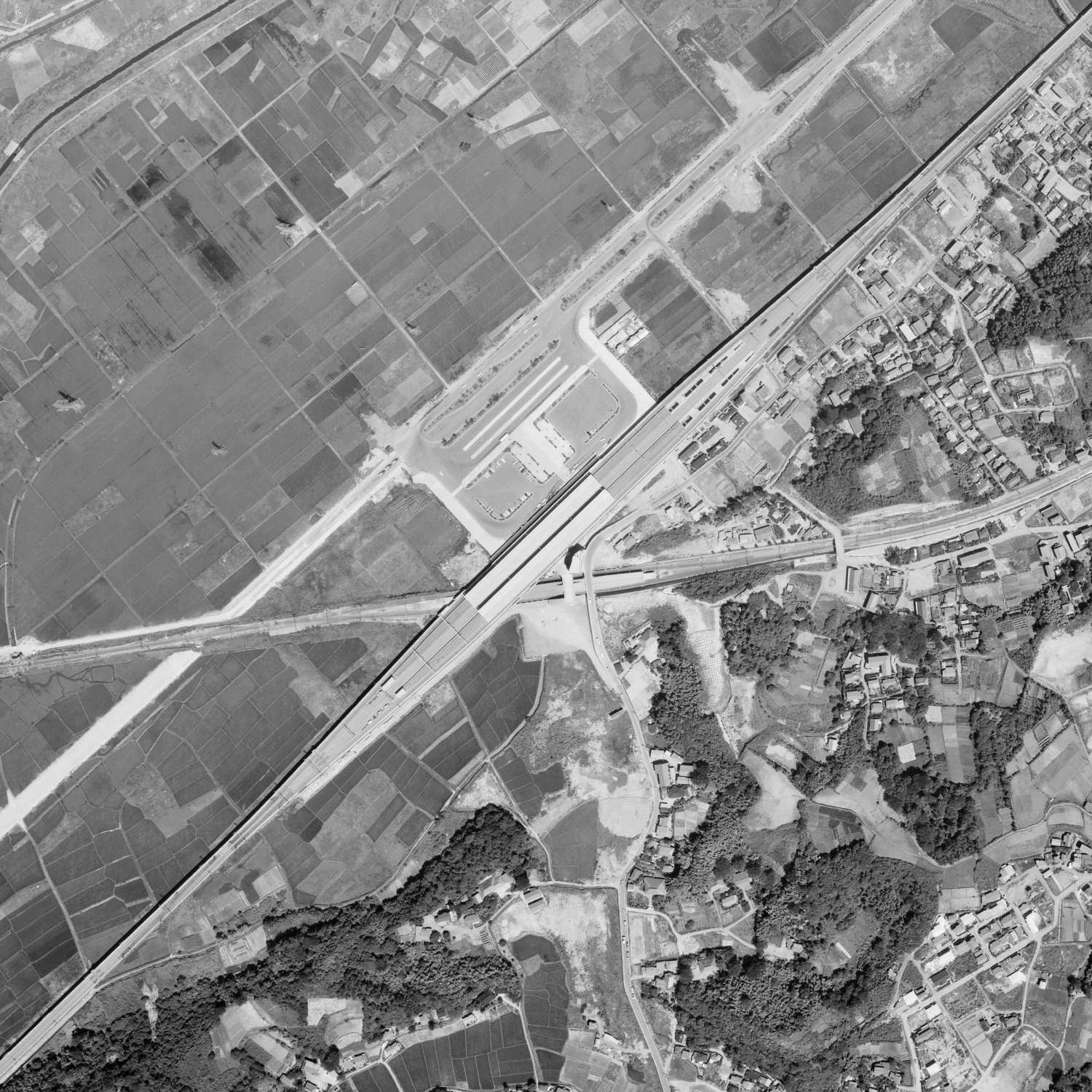
Aerial photo of area around the station in July 1966

Real estate agents purchased the private property in the area by telling residents and local government officials that the land was needed to build a Nissan/Ford motor vehicle factory which would provide increased employment. Actually, however, the agents were in league with JNR and national politicians from the LDP party to acquire the land for the proposed station, which was not disclosed to the public at this time. The subterfuge was subsequently exposed in a novel and popular film called Kuro no Chō Tokkyū (黒の超特急; lit. The Black Super Express). The police opened several investigations, but the suspected agents, JNR employees, and political staffers fled the country until the statute of limitations on the alleged crimes expired.

Shin-Yokohama Station opened on 1 October 1964, with the opening of the Tokaido Shinkansen. At the time, the surrounding area was completely rural, and the site was selected as it was the intersection of the Tōkaidō Shinkansen tracks with the existing Yokohama Line. The station was connected to the Yokohama Municipal Subway system on 14 March 1985. With the privatization of JNR on 1 April 1987, the JNR portion of the station came under the operational control of JR East. The station building was remodeled in 1998.

Station numbering was introduced to the Yokohama Line platforms 20 August 2016 with Shin-Yokohama being assigned station number JH16.

=== Sōtetsu–Tōkyū Link Line ===
The Sōtetsu–Tōkyū jointly operated Shin-yokohama Station opened on 18 March 2023 is one of the major infrastructures of the Eastern Kanagawa Rail Link project to improve the regional access to the Shin-Yokohama Shinkansen station by rail, which was previously only accessible via the JR Yokohama Line and Municipal Subway Blue Line. As a response to the new railways, JR Tokai started a new limited Nozomi service departs from Shin-Yokohama for Nagoya and Shin-Ōsaka on the same day as the opening of the Sōtetsu–Tōkyū Link Line.

Because the Sōtetsu–Tōkyū platform level is directly 2-story underneath the Municipal Subway Blue Line platform, the subway platforms were underpinned to fortify the foundation. The operation of the subway Blue Line was not obstructed during the construction of the new station. All the involved construction parties were commended by the Japan Society of Civil Engineers in 2020 for commencing such a difficult task.

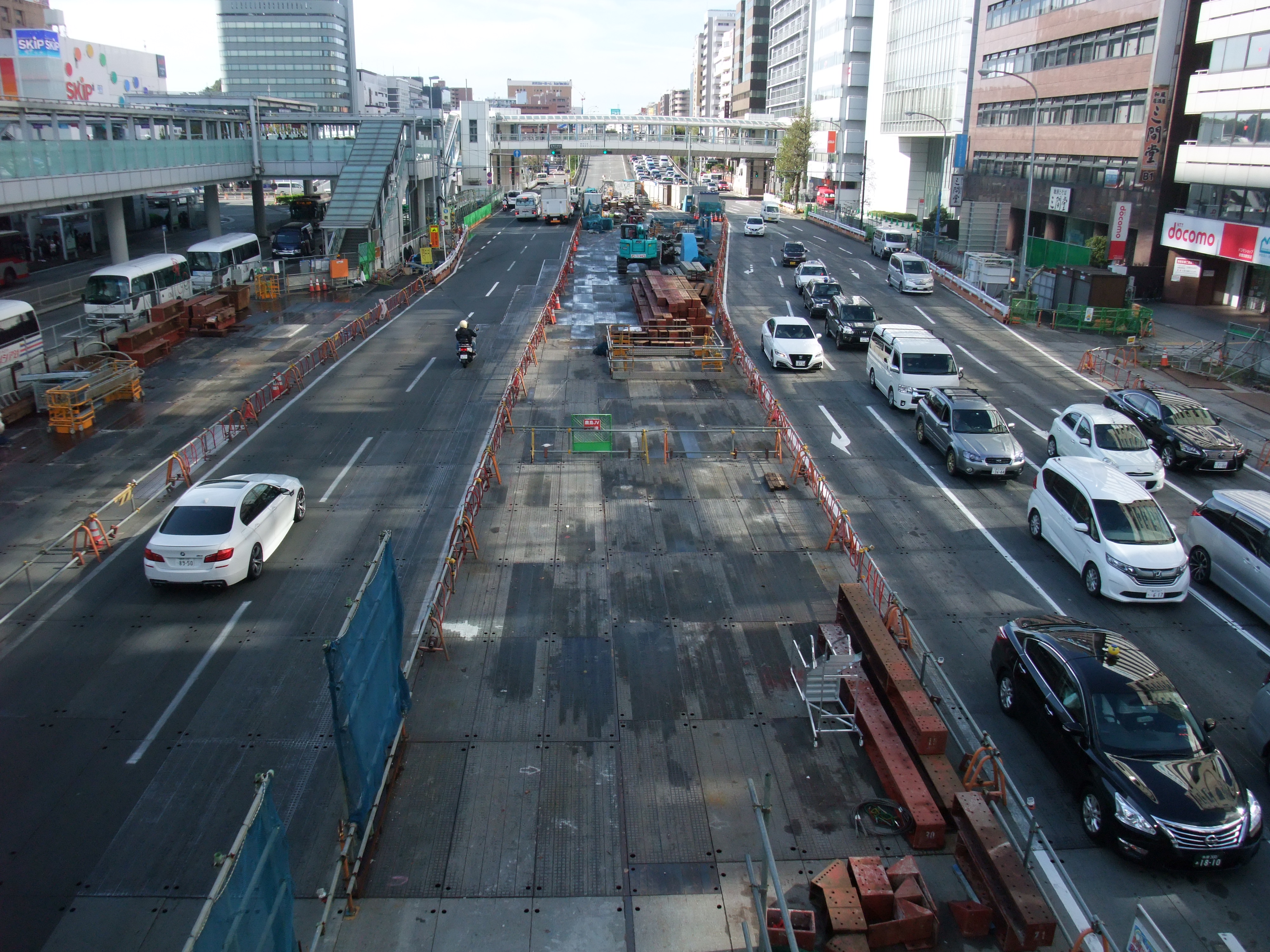
View above the construction site

== Passenger statistics ==
In fiscal 2012, the JR East station was used by an average of 57,439 passengers daily (boarding passengers only). The JR East passenger figures for previous years are as shown below.

Fiscal year	Daily average
2000	44,226
2005	48,040
2010	56,415
2011	56,666
2012	57,439

== Surrounding area ==
The Nissan Stadium (formerly International Stadium Yokohama), the largest stadium in Japan with a capacity of 72,327 seats, was host to the 2002 FIFA World Cup final match and is the home of the Yokohama F Marinos football team. The Nissan Stadium, Yokohama Arena, and Yokohama Rosai Hospital are each about a 10-minute walk from the station. The Shin-Yokohama Rāmen Museum is about a 5-minute walk from the station.

=== Nearby hotels ===
- Shin Yokohama Prince Hotel
- Hotel Associa Shin-Yokohama
