= Kozukue Station =

Railway station in Yokohama, Japan

JH17 Kozukue Station 小机駅
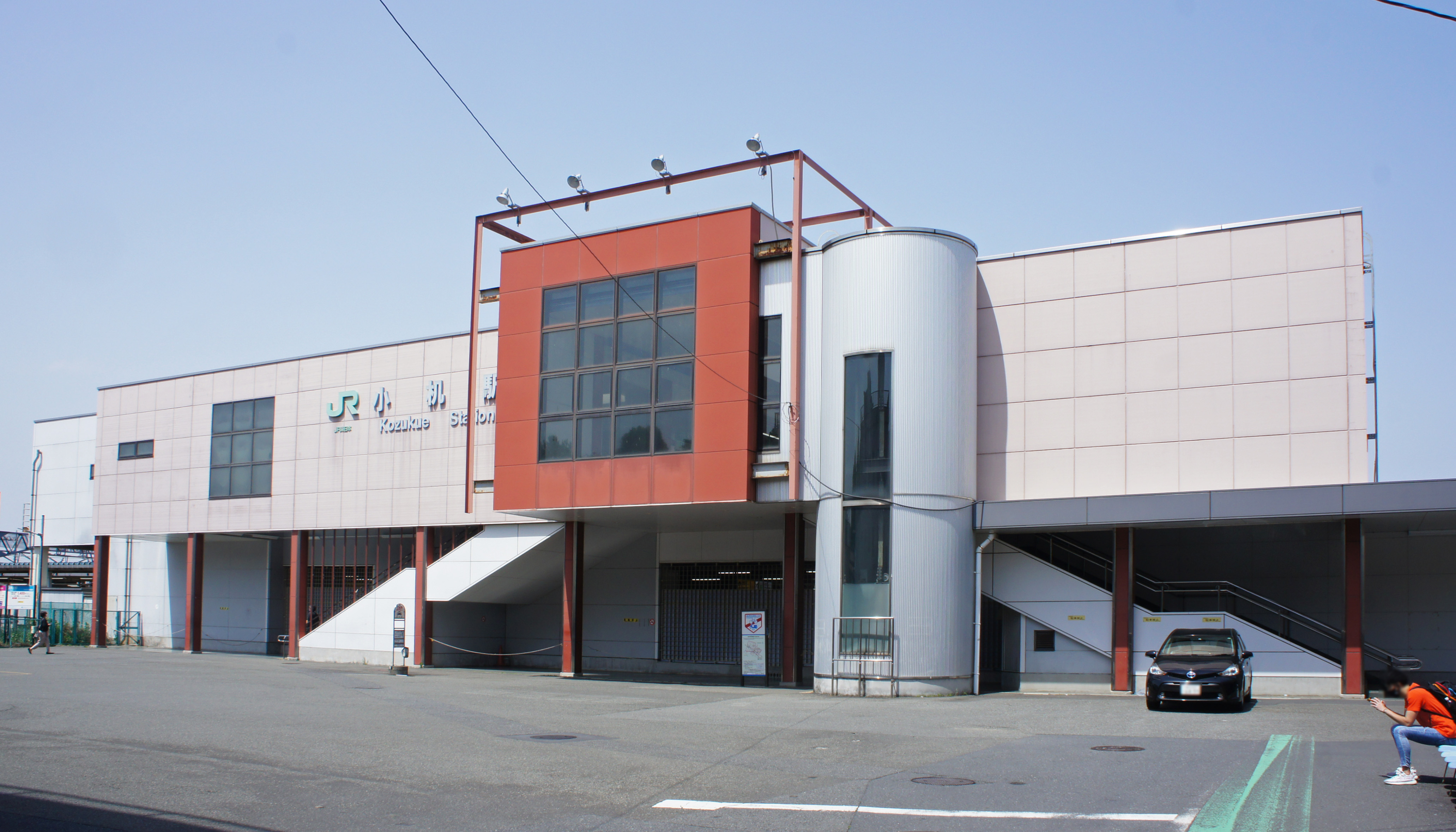
- Kozukue Station South Exit, May 2021

General information
- Location: Kozukue-chō 2534 Kōhoku-ku, Yokohama-shi, Kanagawa-ken 222-0036; Japan
- Coordinates: 35°30′30.8″N 139°36′0.2″E
- Operator: JR East
- Line: Yokohama Line
- Platforms: 1 island + 1 side platform

Other information
- Status: Staffed
- Station code: JH17
- Website: Official website

History
- Opened: 23 September 1908

Passengers
- FY2019: 10,345 daily

Services
Preceding station	JR East	Following station
Kamoi JH18 towards Hachiōji	Yokohama Line Local	Shin-Yokohama JH16 towards Higashi-Kanagawa or Ōfuna
Location
- Location within Kanagawa Prefecture Location within Japan

Kozukue Station (小机駅, Kozukue-eki) is a passenger railway station located in Kōhoku-ku, Yokohama, Kanagawa Prefecture, Japan, operated by the East Japan Railway Company (JR East).

== Lines ==
Kozukue Station is served by the Yokohama Line from Higashi-Kanagawa to Hachiōji, and is 7.8 km from the official starting point of the line at Higashi-Kanagawa. Many services continue west of Higashi-Kanagawa via the Negishi Line to Sakuragicho during the offpeak, and to Ōfuna during the morning peak.

== Station layout ==
The station consists of a single island platform and a side platform serving three elevated tracks, with the station building underneath. The station is staffed.

=== Platforms ===
1	Yokohama Line	for Machida, Hashimoto and Hachioji
2,3	Yokohama Line	for Higashi-Kanagawa, Yokohama, Sakuragicho, and Ōfuna

== History ==
Kozukue Station was opened on 23 September 1908 as a station on the privately held Yokohama Railway Company. The line was acquired by the Japanese government in 1910, and merged into the Japanese Government Railways system (the predecessor to the JNR) from October 1, 1917. The station building was destroyed in the 1923 Great Kantō earthquake and rebuilt in 1925. All freight operations were suspended from 1972. With the privatization of the JNR on 1 April 1987, the station came under the operational control of JR East. A new station building was completed in 1998.

Station numbering was introduced to the Yokohama Line platforms 20 August 2016 with Kozukue being assigned station number JH17.

== Passenger statistics ==
In fiscal 2019, the station was used by an average of 10,345 passengers daily (boarding passengers only).

The passenger figures (boarding passengers only) for previous years are as shown below.

Fiscal year	daily average
2005	9,451
2010	9,764
2015	10,336

== See also ==
- List of railway stations in Japan
