= Nippa Station =

Metro station in Yokohama, Japan

Coordinates: 35°31′39.32″N 139°36′42.42″E

B27 Nippa Station 新羽駅
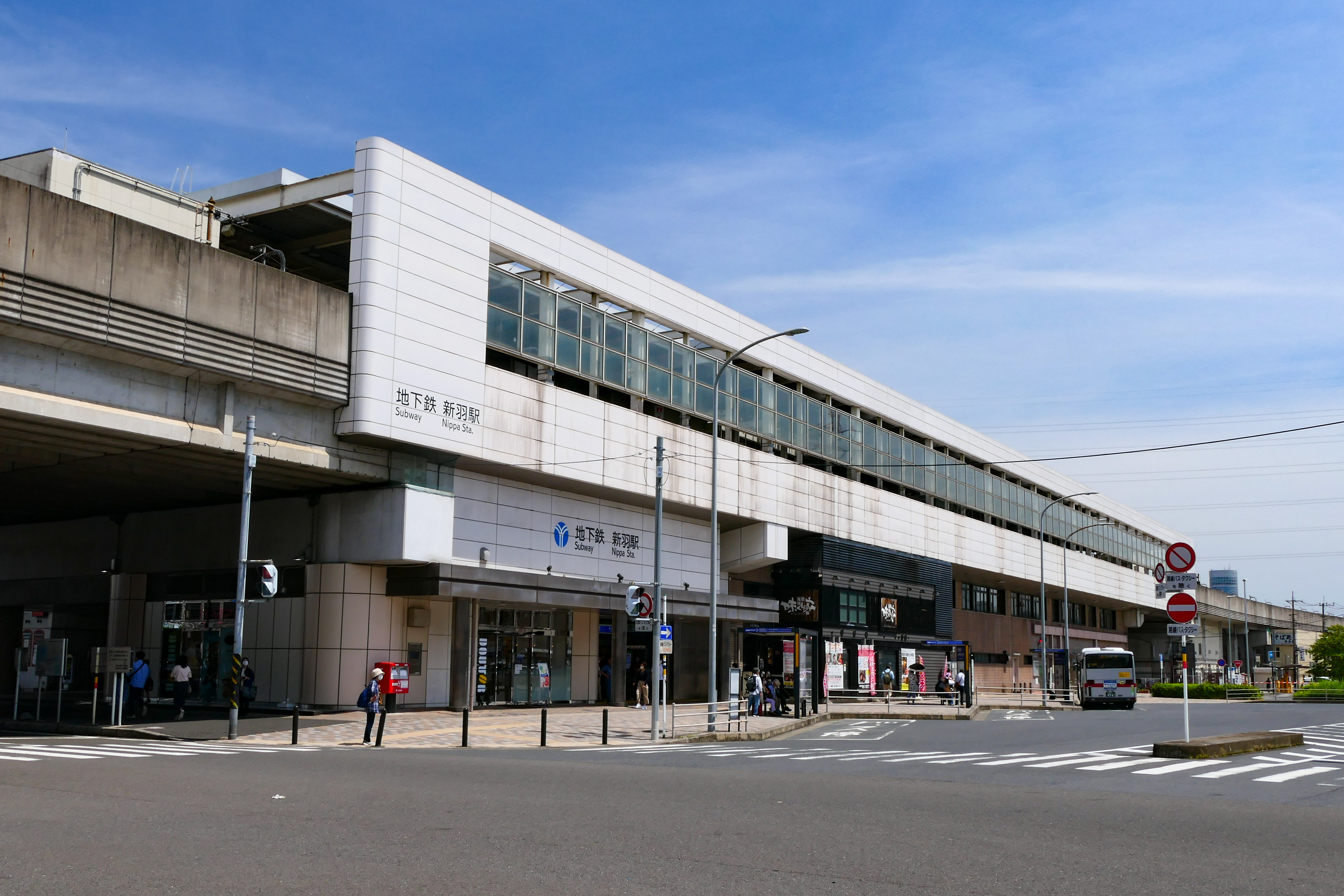
- Nippa Station building in May 2023

General information
- Location: Nippa-chō Nakamachi 1285-1, Kōhoku, Yokohama, Kanagawa （横浜市港北区新羽町字仲町1285-1） Japan
- System: Yokohama Municipal Subway station
- Operator: Yokohama City Transportation Bureau
- Line: Blue Line
- Platforms: 4 (2 island platforms)
- Tracks: 3

Other information
- Station code: B27

History
- Opened: 18 March 1993; 33 years ago

Passengers
- 2008: 8,361 daily

Services
Preceding station	Yokohama Municipal Subway	Following station
Shin-Yokohama B25 towards Shonandai	Blue Line Rapid	Nakamachidai B28 towards Azamino
Kita Shin-Yokohama B26 towards Shonandai	Blue Line Local	Nakamachidai B28 towards Azamino
Location
- Location within Yokohama Location within Kanagawa Prefecture Location within Japan

Nippa Station (新羽駅, Nippa-eki) is an above-ground metro station located in Kōhoku-ku, Yokohama, Kanagawa Prefecture, Japan operated by the Yokohama Municipal Subway’s Blue Line (Line 3). It is 31.8 kilometers from the terminus of the Blue Line at Shōnandai Station.

== Lines ==
- Yokohama Municipal Subway
  - Blue Line

== Station layout ==
Nippa Station has two elevated island platforms serving four tracks. The ground-level station building is located underneath the tracks and platforms. The inner Tracks 2 and 3 are used for services originating at Nippa Station

=== Platforms ===
1,2	■ Blue Line (Yokohama)	Shin-Yokohama, Yokohama, Kannai, Totsuka, Shōnandai
3,4	■ Blue Line (Yokohama)	Azamino

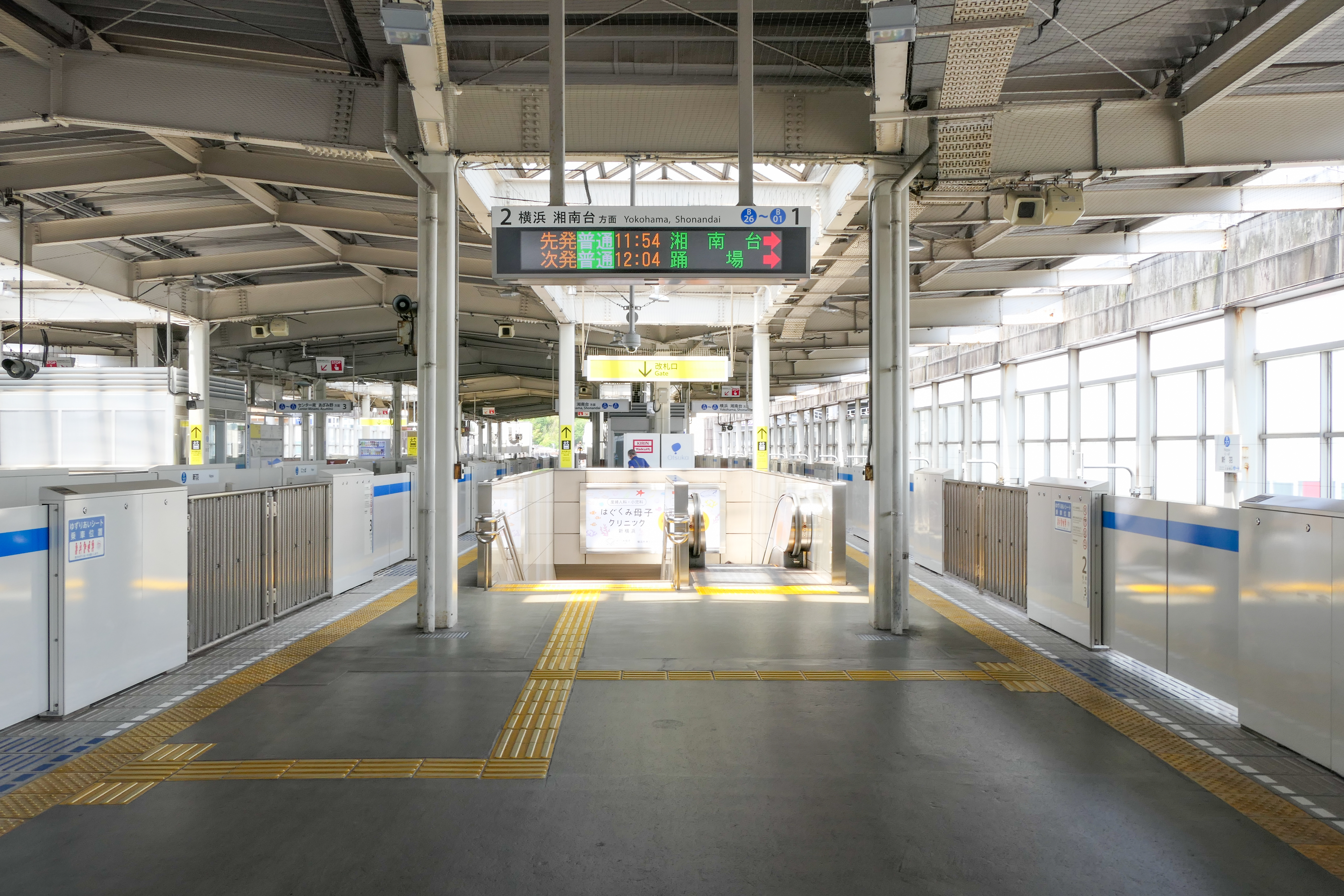
Platforms 1 and 2 in May 2023

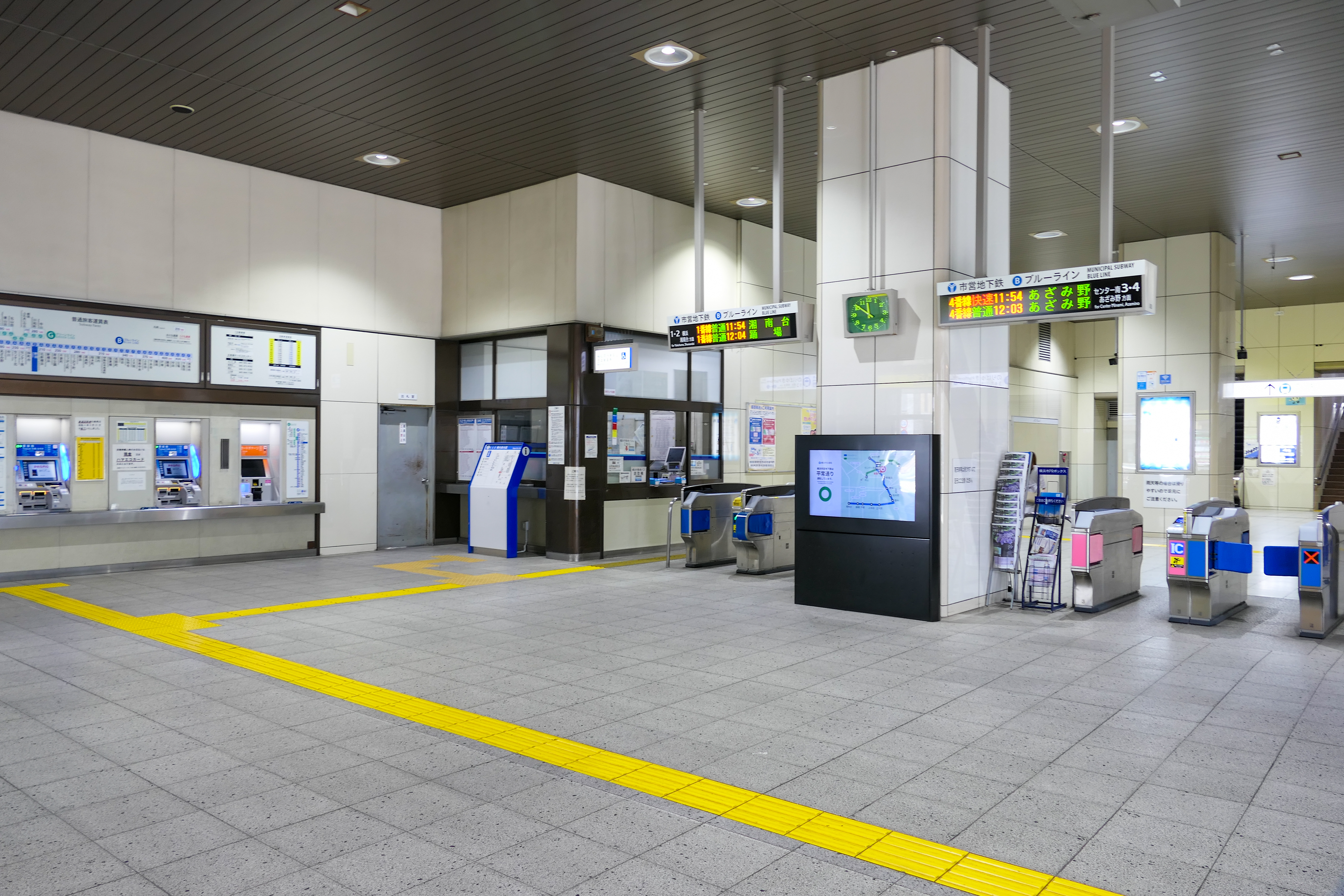
Ticket gate

== History ==
Nippa Station was opened on 18 March 1993. Platform screen doors were installed in April 2007.
