= Yokohama =

Designated city in Kantō, Japan

Yokohama 横浜市
- Prefecture capital and Designated city
- City of Yokohama
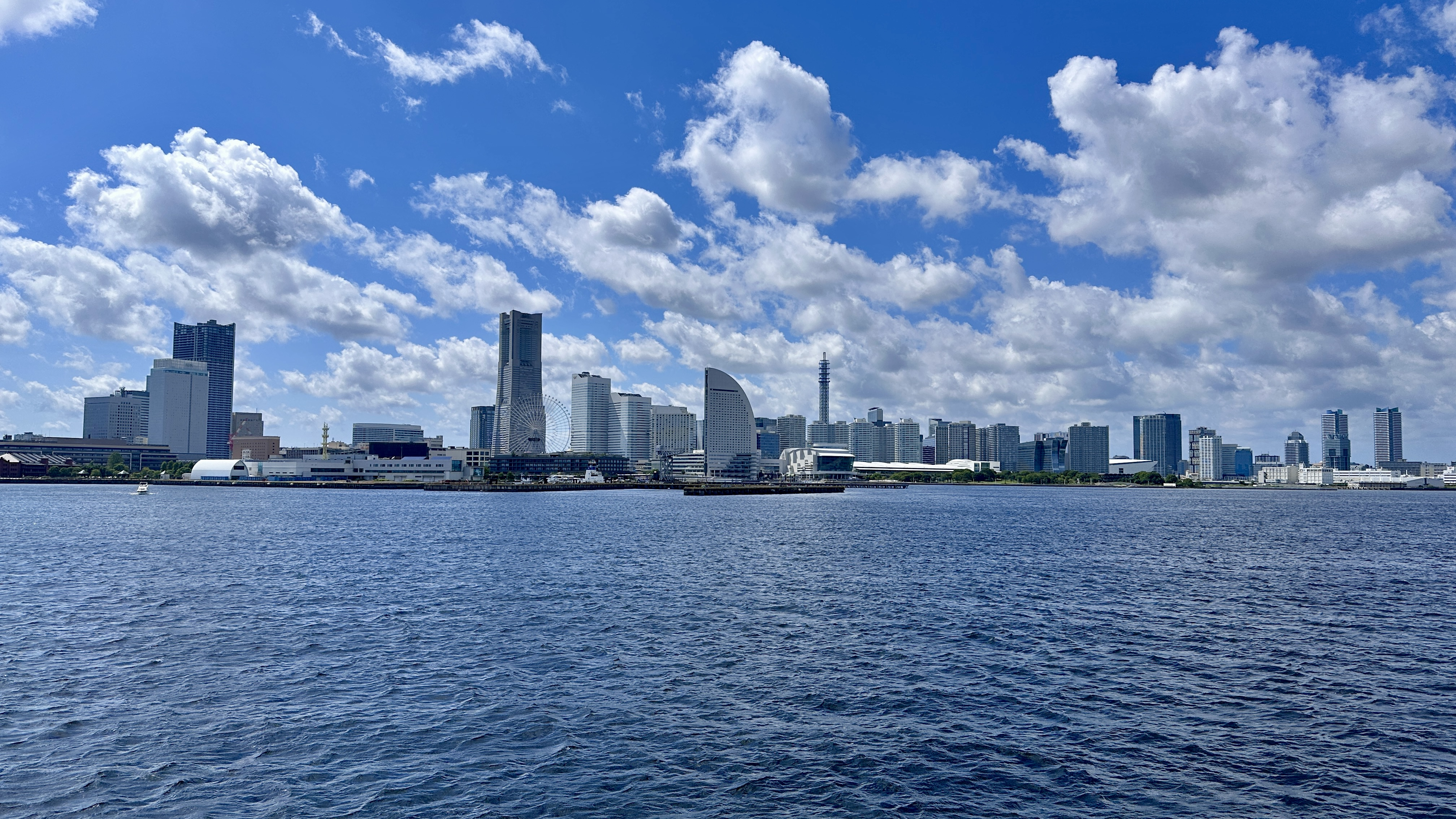
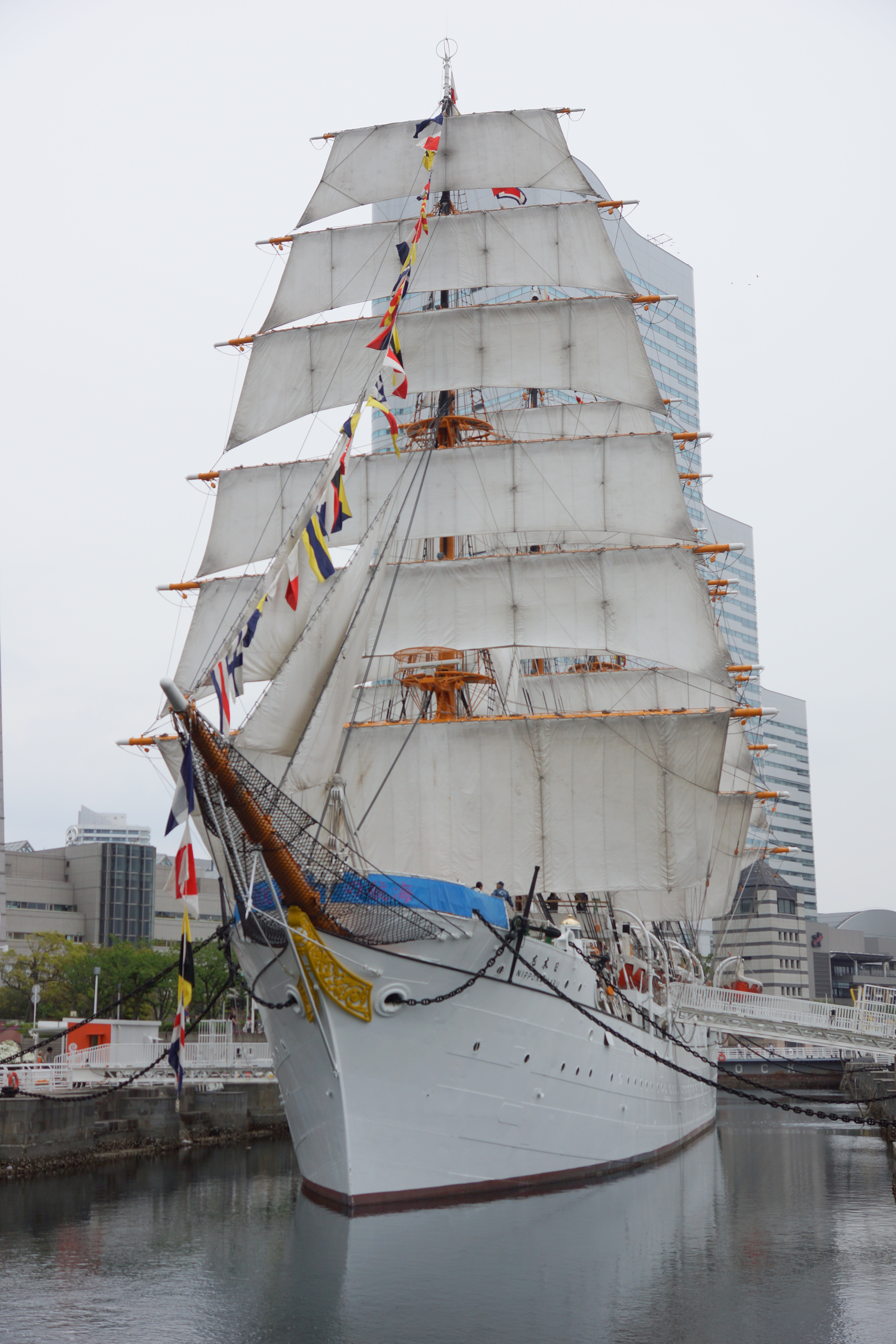
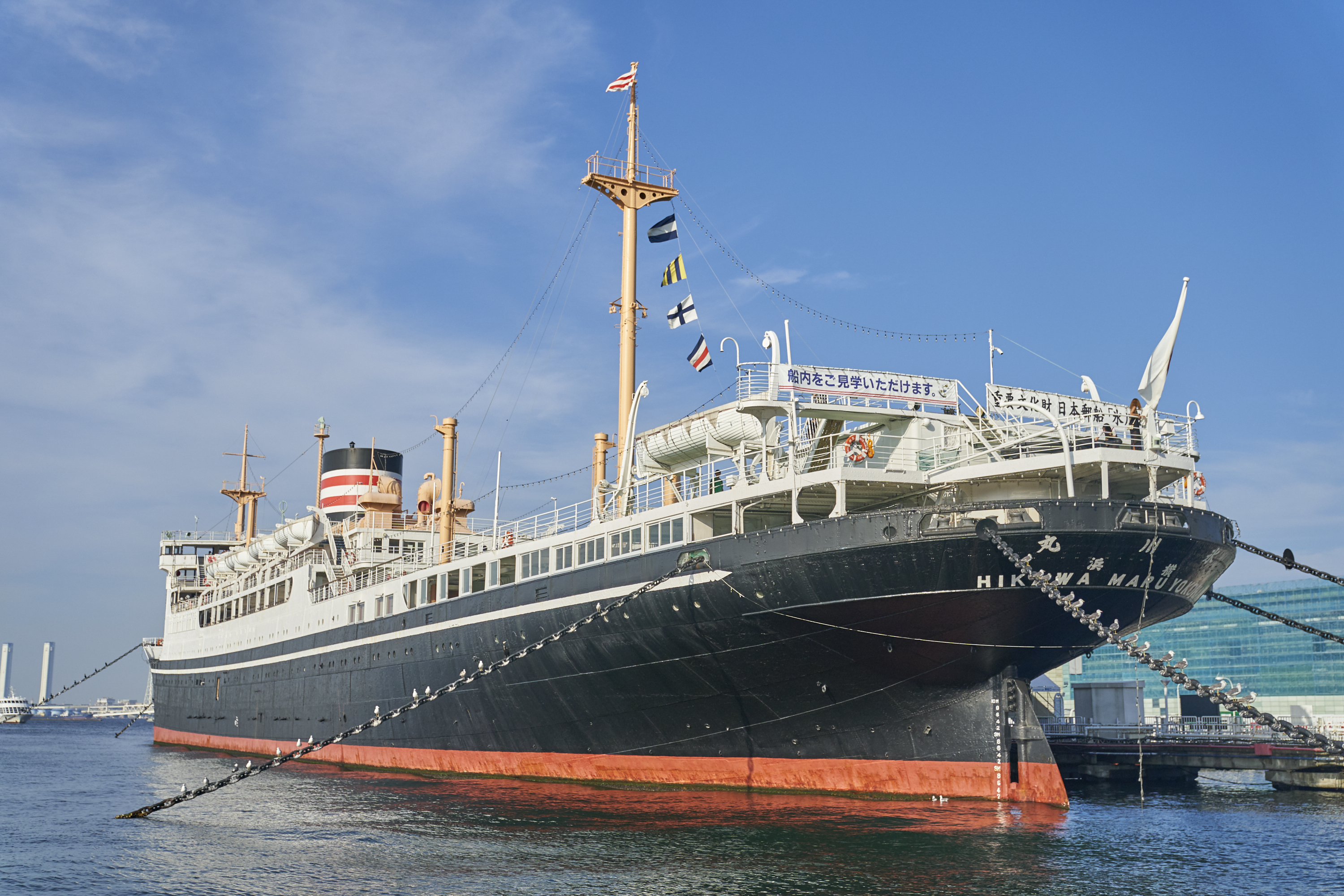
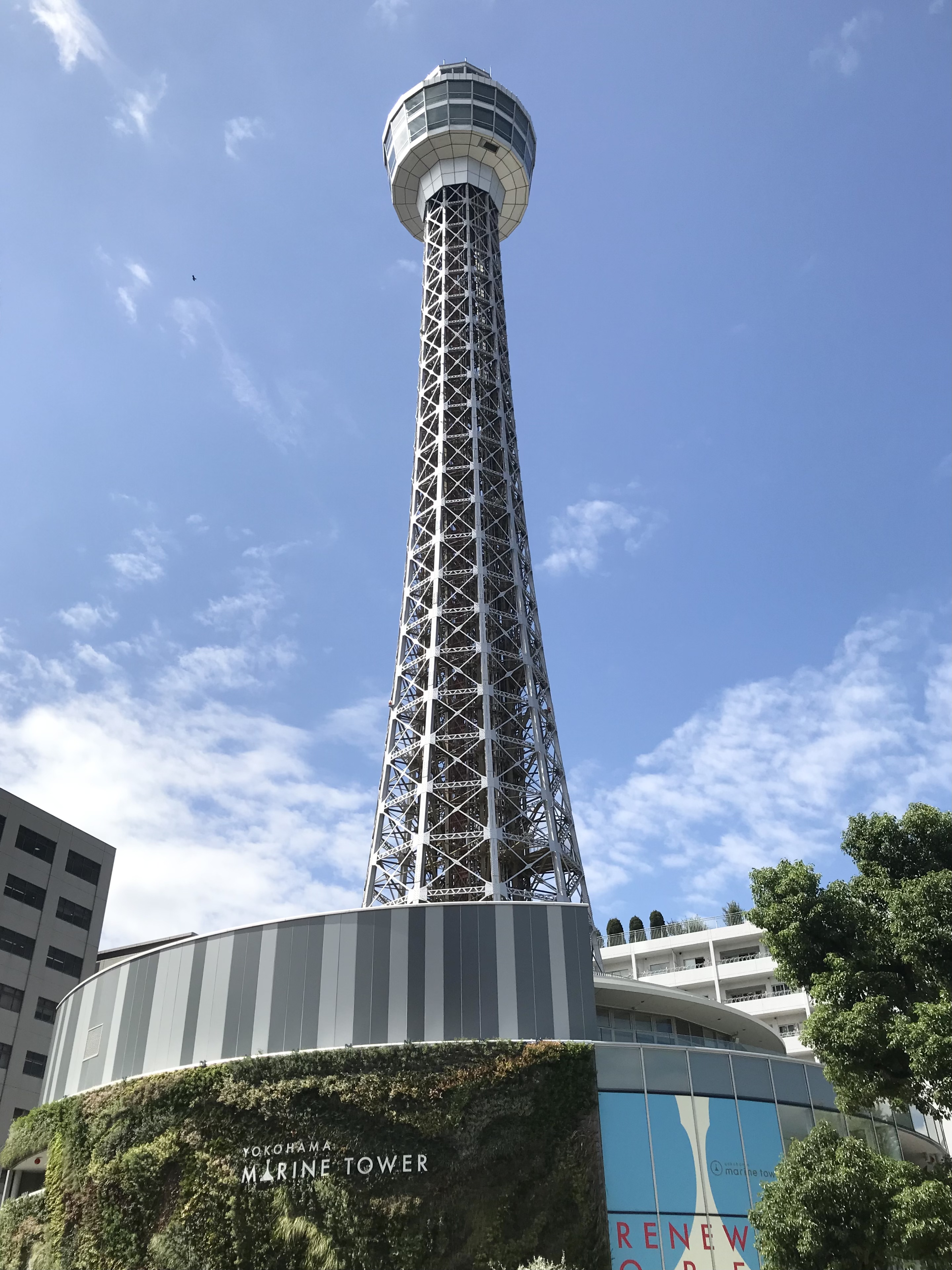
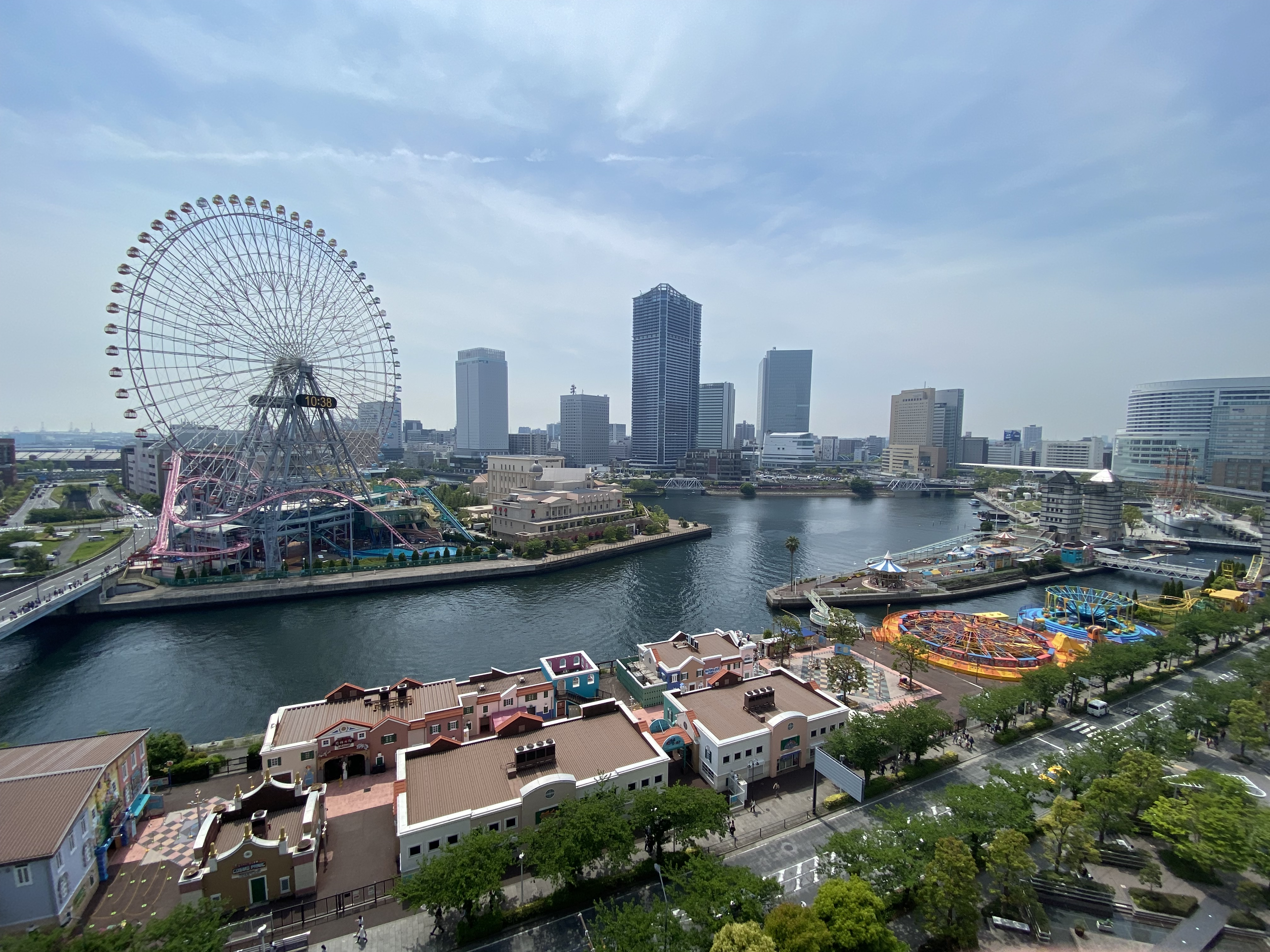
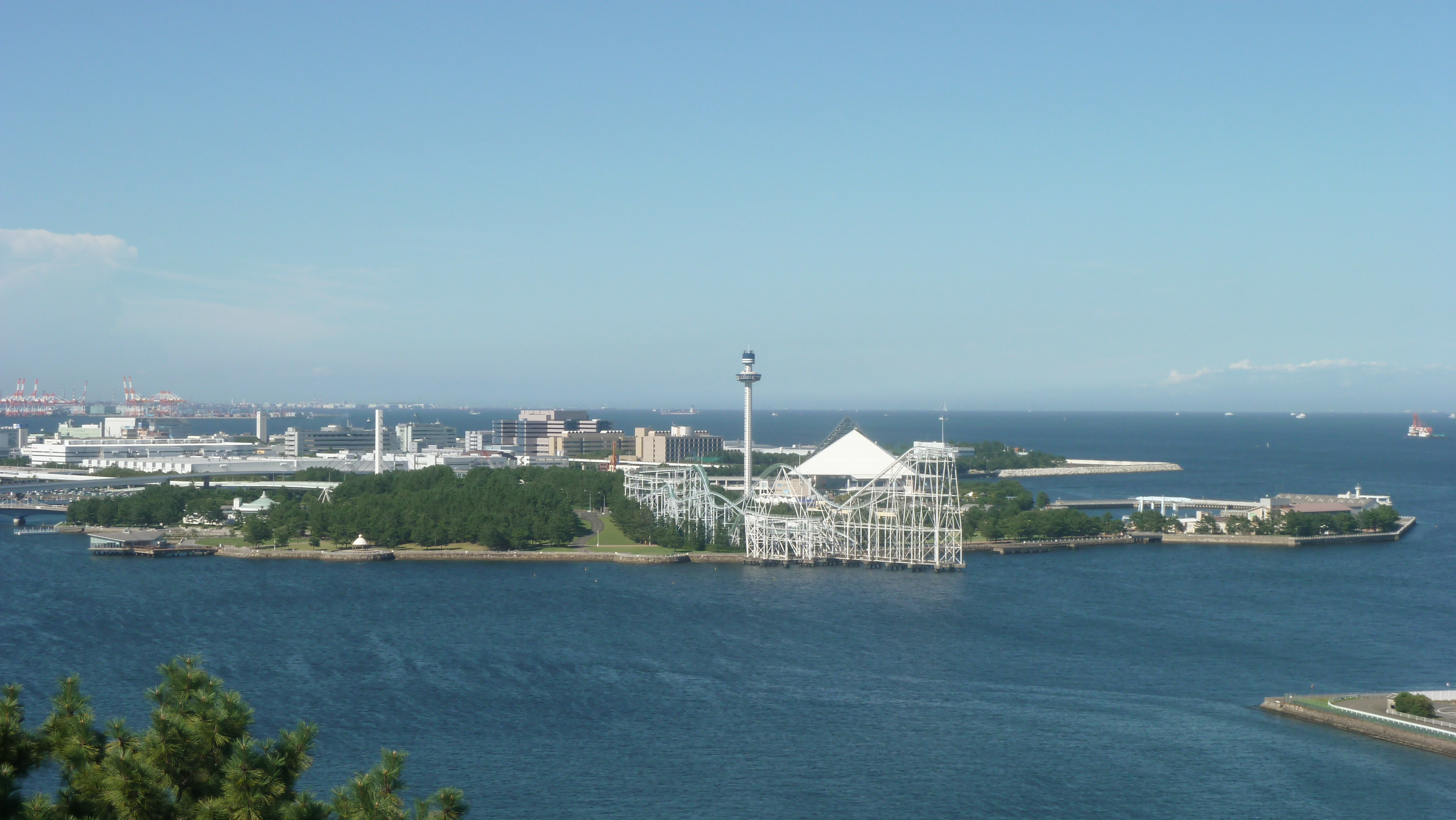
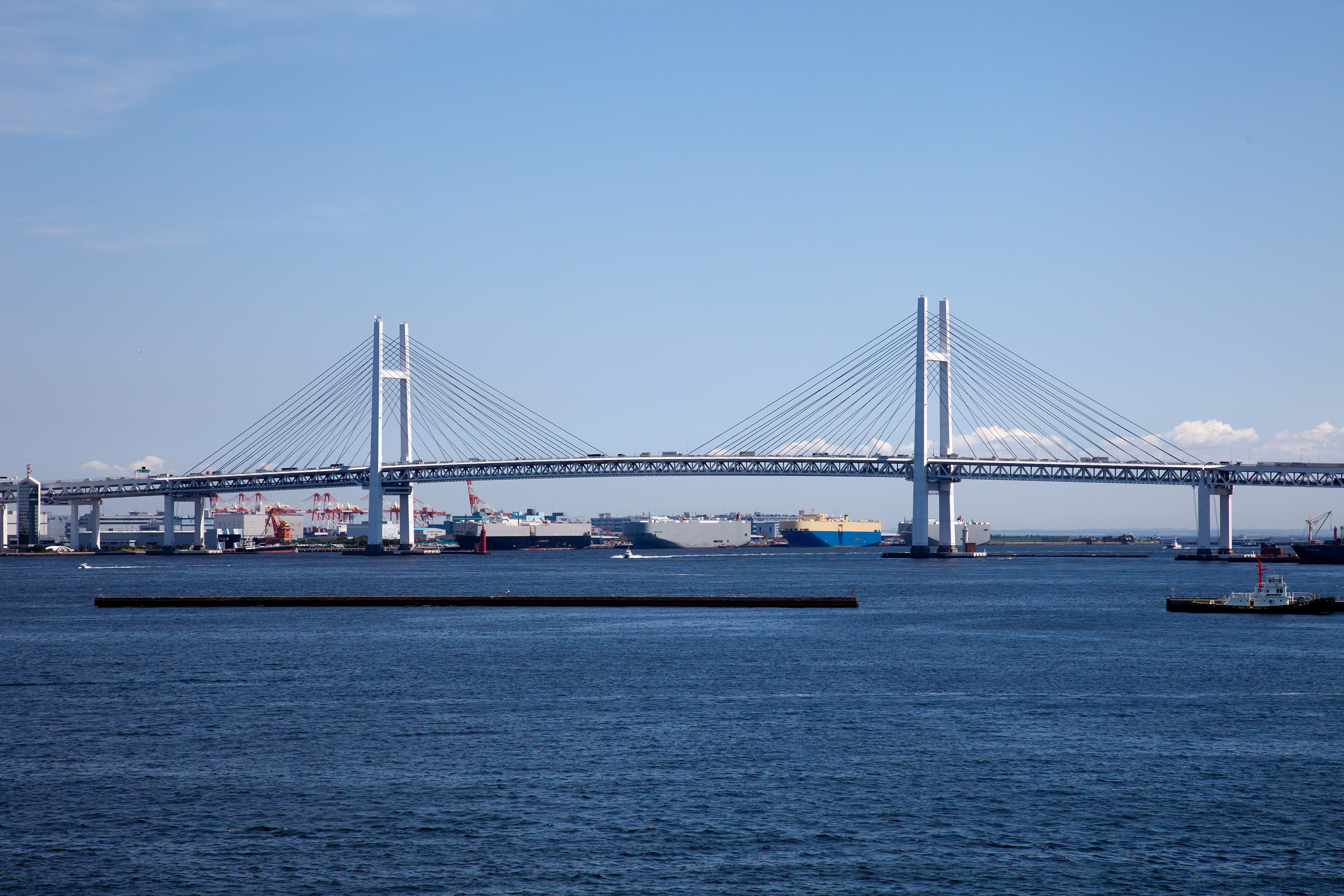
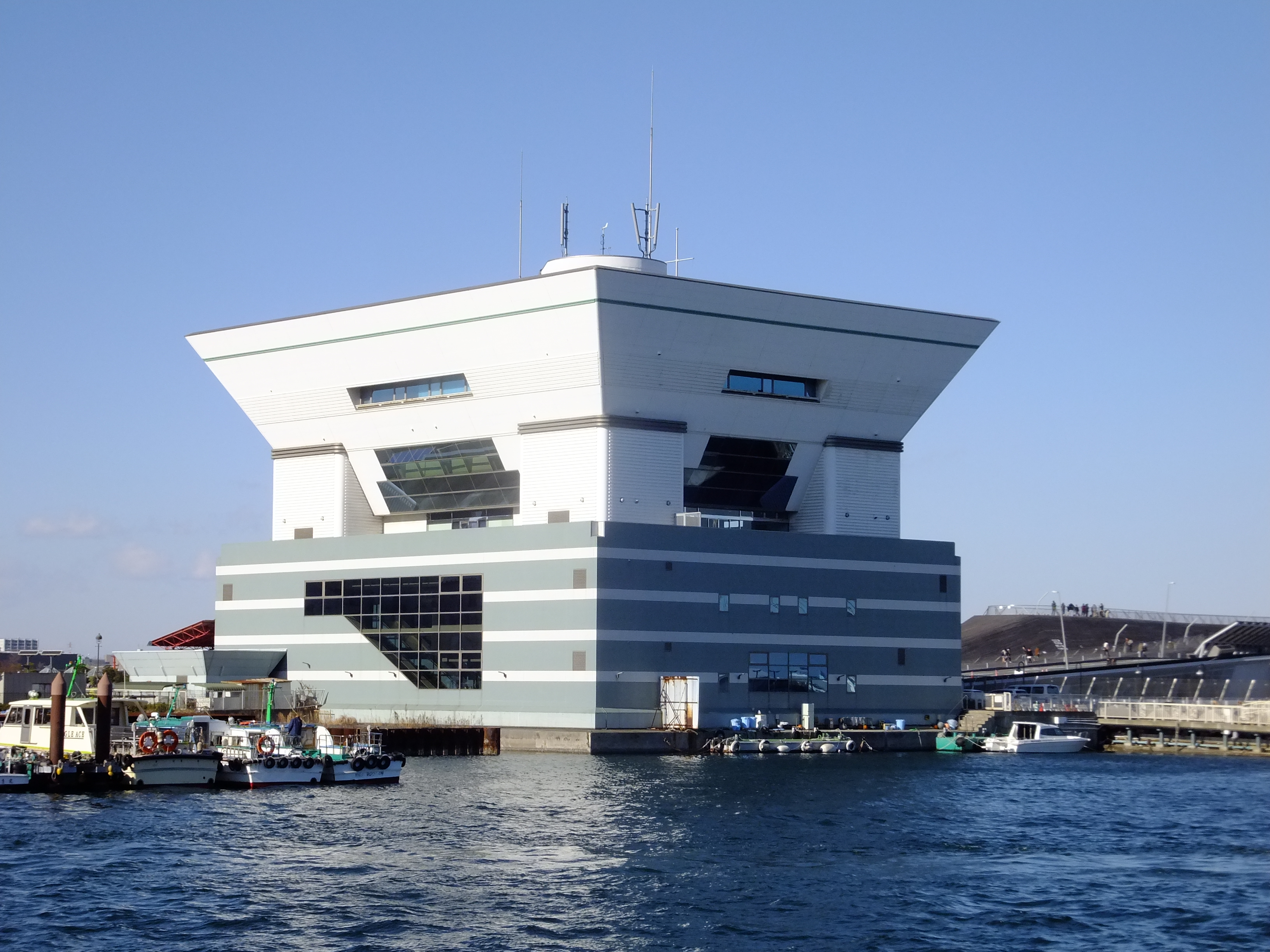
- Minato Mirai 21 skyline Nippon Maru Hikawa Maru moored at Yamashita Park Yokohama Marine Tower Cosmo Clock 21 Yokohama Hakkeijima Sea Paradise Yokohama Bay Bridge Osanbashi Pier

- Flag Emblem

- Map of Kanagawa Prefecture with Yokohama highlighted in purple

- Yokohama (Asia)
- Coordinates: 35°26′39″N 139°38′17″E
- Country: Japan
- Region: Kantō
- Prefecture: Kanagawa
- City settled: April 1, 1889
- Designated city settled: September 1, 1956

Government
  - Mayor: Atsumi Harasawai

Area
  - Total: 437.38 km^{2} (168.87 sq mi)

Population (January 1, 2023)
  - Total: 3,759,595
  - Rank: 2nd in Japan
  - Density: 8,606/km^{2} (22,290/sq mi)
- Time zone: UTC+9 (Japan Standard Time)
  - Tree: Camellia, Chinquapin, Sangoju; Sasanqua, Ginkgo, Zelkova
  - Flower: Dahlia; Rose
- Address: 6-50-10 Honchō, Naka-ku, Yokohama-shi, Kanagawa-ken; 231-0005
- Website: www.city.yokohama.lg.jp

Yokohama
- "Yokohama" in new-style (shinjitai) kanji

Japanese name
- Kyūjitai: 橫濱
- Shinjitai: 横浜
Transcriptions
- Romanization: Yokohama

Yokohama (横浜市, Yokohama-shi; [jò̞.kó̞.hä́.mä́(.ɕì)]) is the second-largest city in Japan by population as well as by area, and the country's most populous municipality. (Note: Although Tokyo has over 10 million more people than Yokohama, there has been no single Tokyo municipality since 1943. Instead, the area that makes up what is generally considered as Tokyo city is made up of 23 separate municipalities called special wards) It is the capital and most populous city in Kanagawa Prefecture, with a population of 3.7 million in 2023. The population was the same in 2026, but steadily decreased over 2025. It lies on Tokyo Bay, south of Tokyo, in the Kantō region of the main island of Honshu. Yokohama is also the major economic, cultural, and commercial hub of the Greater Tokyo Area along the Keihin Industrial Zone.

Yokohama was one of the cities to open for trade with the West following the end of the policy of seclusion in 1859, and has since been known as a cosmopolitan port city, after Kobe opened in 1853. Yokohama developed rapidly as Japan's prominent port city following the end of Japan's relative isolation in the mid-19th century and is today one of its major ports along with Kobe, Osaka, Nagoya, Fukuoka, Tokyo and Chiba.

Yokohama is the largest port city and high tech industrial hub in the Greater Tokyo Area and the Kantō region. The city proper is headquarters to companies such as Isuzu, Nissan, JVCKenwood, Keikyu, Koei Tecmo, Sotetsu and Bank of Yokohama. Famous landmarks in Yokohama include Minato Mirai 21, Nippon Maru Memorial Park, Yokohama Chinatown, Motomachi Shopping Street, Yokohama Marine Tower, Yamashita Park, and Ōsanbashi Pier.

== Etymology ==
The current area surrounded by Maita Park, the Ōoka River and the Nakamura River have been a gulf divided by a sandbar from the open sea. This sandbar was the original Yokohama fishing village. Since the sandbar (浜, hama) protruded perpendicularly from the land, or horizontally (横, yoko) when viewed from the sea, it was called "Yokohama".

== History ==
=== Opening of the Treaty Port (1859–1868) ===
Before the Europeans arrived, Yokohama was a small fishing village up to the end of the feudal Edo period, when Japan held a policy of national seclusion, having little contact with foreigners. A major turning point in Japanese history happened in 1853–54, when Commodore Matthew Perry arrived just south of Yokohama with a fleet of American warships, demanding that Japan open several ports for commerce, and the Tokugawa shogunate agreed by signing the Treaty of Peace and Amity.

It was initially agreed that one of the ports to be opened to foreign ships would be the town of Kanagawa-juku (in what is now Kanagawa Ward) on the Tōkaidō, a strategic highway that linked Edo to Kyoto and Osaka. However, the Tokugawa shogunate decided that Kanagawa-juku was too close to the Tōkaidō for comfort, and port facilities were instead built across the inlet in the fishing village of Yokohama. The Port of Yokohama was officially opened on June 2, 1859.

Yokohama quickly became a base for foreign trade in Japan. Foreigners initially occupied the low-lying district of the city called Kannai, residential districts later expanding as the settlement grew to incorporate much of the elevated Yamate district overlooking the city, commonly referred to by English-speaking residents as The Bluff. Under pressure from United States and United Kingdom officials, the Tokugawa government built a commercial sex district which opened on November 10, 1859, with 6 brothels and 200 indentured sex workers. The area of Yokohama with the highest concentration of brothels was known as Bloodtown.

Kannai, the foreign trade and commercial district (literally, inside the barrier), was surrounded by a moat, foreign residents enjoying extraterritorial status both within and outside the compound. Interactions with the local population, particularly young samurai, outside the settlement inevitably caused problems; the Namamugi Incident, one of the events that preceded the downfall of the shogunate, took place in what is now Tsurumi Ward in 1862, and prompted the Bombardment of Kagoshima in 1863.

To protect British commercial and diplomatic interests in Yokohama a military garrison was established in 1862. With the growth in trade increasing numbers of Chinese also came to settle in the city. Yokohama was the scene of many notable firsts for Japan including the growing acceptance of western fashion, photography by pioneers such as Felice Beato, Japan's first English language newspaper, the Japan Herald published in 1861 and in 1865 the first ice cream confectionery and beer to be produced in Japan. Recreational sports introduced to Japan by foreign residents in Yokohama included European style horse racing in 1862, cricket in 1863 and rugby union in 1866. A great fire destroyed much of the foreign settlement on November 26, 1866, and smallpox was a recurrent public health hazard, but the city continued to grow rapidly – attracting foreigners and Japanese alike.

=== Meiji and Taisho eras (1868–1923) ===
After the Meiji Restoration of 1868, the port was developed for trading silk, the main trading partner being Great Britain. Western influence and technological transfer contributed to the establishment of Japan's first daily newspaper (1870), first gas-powered street lamps (1872) and Japan's first railway constructed in the same year to connect Yokohama to Shinagawa and Shinbashi in Tokyo. In 1872 Jules Verne portrayed Yokohama, which he had never visited, in an episode of his widely read novel Around the World in Eighty Days, capturing the atmosphere of the fast-developing, internationally oriented Japanese city.

In 1887, a British merchant, Samuel Cocking, built the city's first official power plant. At first for his own use, this coal power plant became the basis for the Yokohama Cooperative Electric Light Company. The city was officially incorporated on April 1, 1889. By the time the extraterritoriality of foreigner areas was abolished in 1899, Yokohama was the most international city in Japan, with foreigner areas stretching from Kannai to the Bluff area and the large Yokohama Chinatown.

The early 20th century was marked by rapid growth of industry. Entrepreneurs built factories along reclaimed land to the north of the city toward Kawasaki, which eventually grew to be the Keihin Industrial Area. The growth of Japanese industry brought affluence, and many wealthy trading families constructed sprawling residences there, while the rapid influx of population from Japan and Korea also led to the formation of Kojiki-Yato, then the largest slum in Japan.

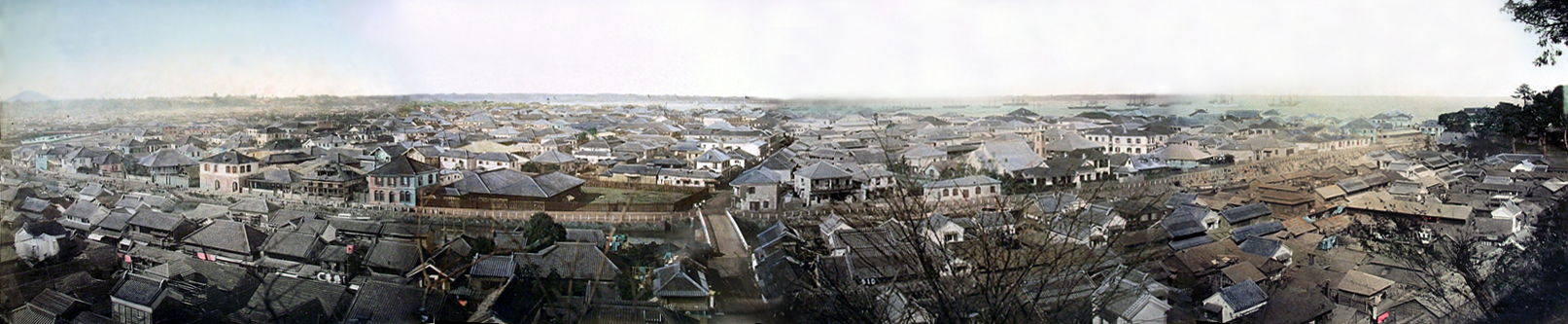
Yokohama c. 1880

=== Great Kantō earthquake and World War II (1923–1945) ===
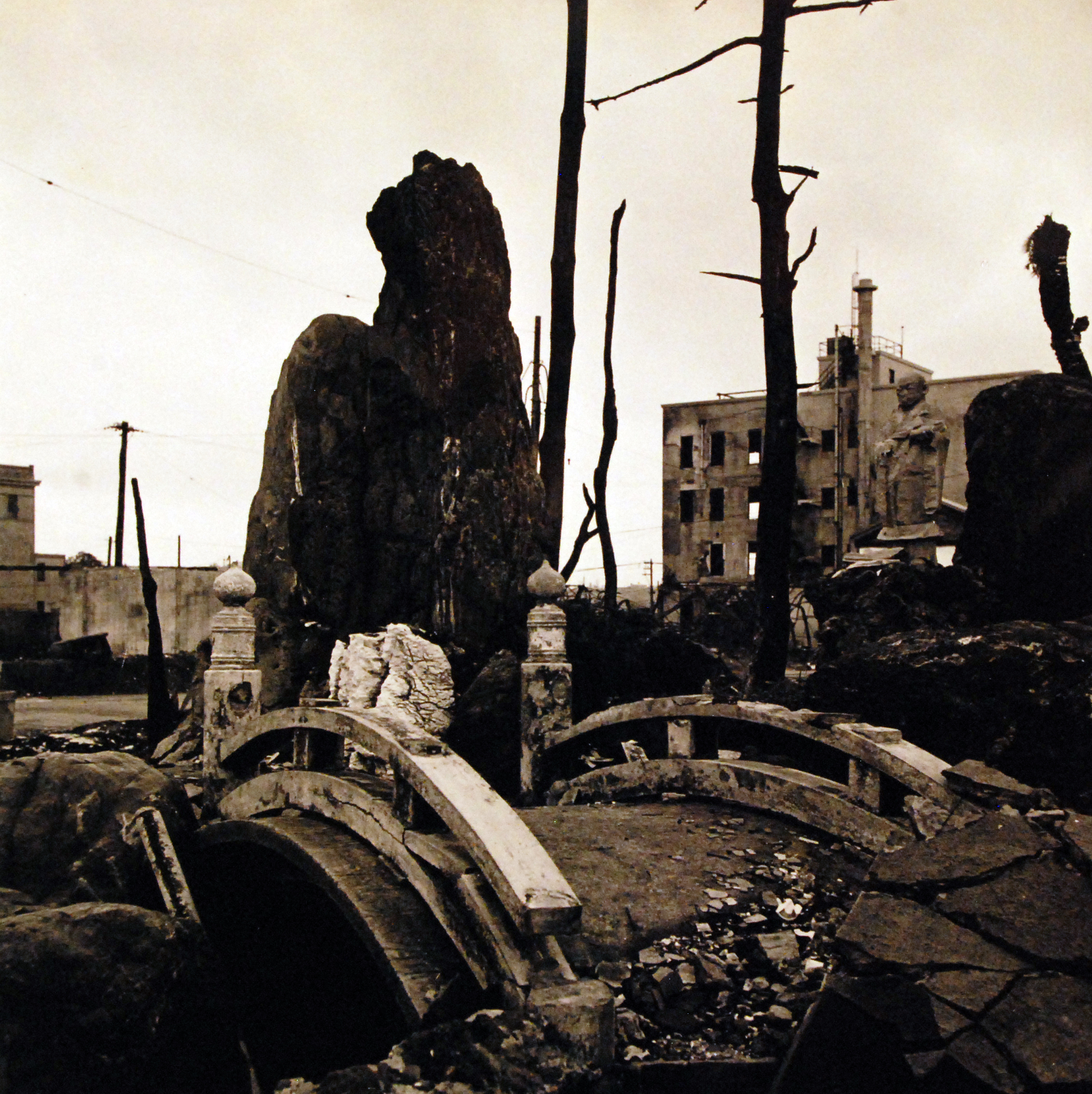
Yokohama in the aftermath of air raids during the Second World War

Much of Yokohama was destroyed on September 1, 1923, by the Great Kantō earthquake. The Yokohama police reported casualties at 30,771 dead and 47,908 injured, out of a pre-earthquake population of 434,170. Fuelled by rumors of rebellion and sabotage, vigilante mobs thereupon murdered many Koreans in the Kojiki-yato slum is what is called the Kantō Massacre. Many people believed that Koreans used black magic to cause the earthquake. Martial law was in place until November 19, 1923. Rubble from the quake was used to reclaim land for parks, the most famous being the Yamashita Park on the waterfront which opened in 1930.

Yokohama was rebuilt, only to be destroyed again by U.S. air raids during World War II. The first bombing was in the April 18, 1942 Doolittle Raid. An estimated 7,000–8,000 people were killed in a single morning on May 29, 1945, in what is now known as the Great Yokohama Air Raid, when B-29s firebombed the city and in just one hour and nine minutes, reducing 42% of it to rubble.

=== Postwar growth and development ===
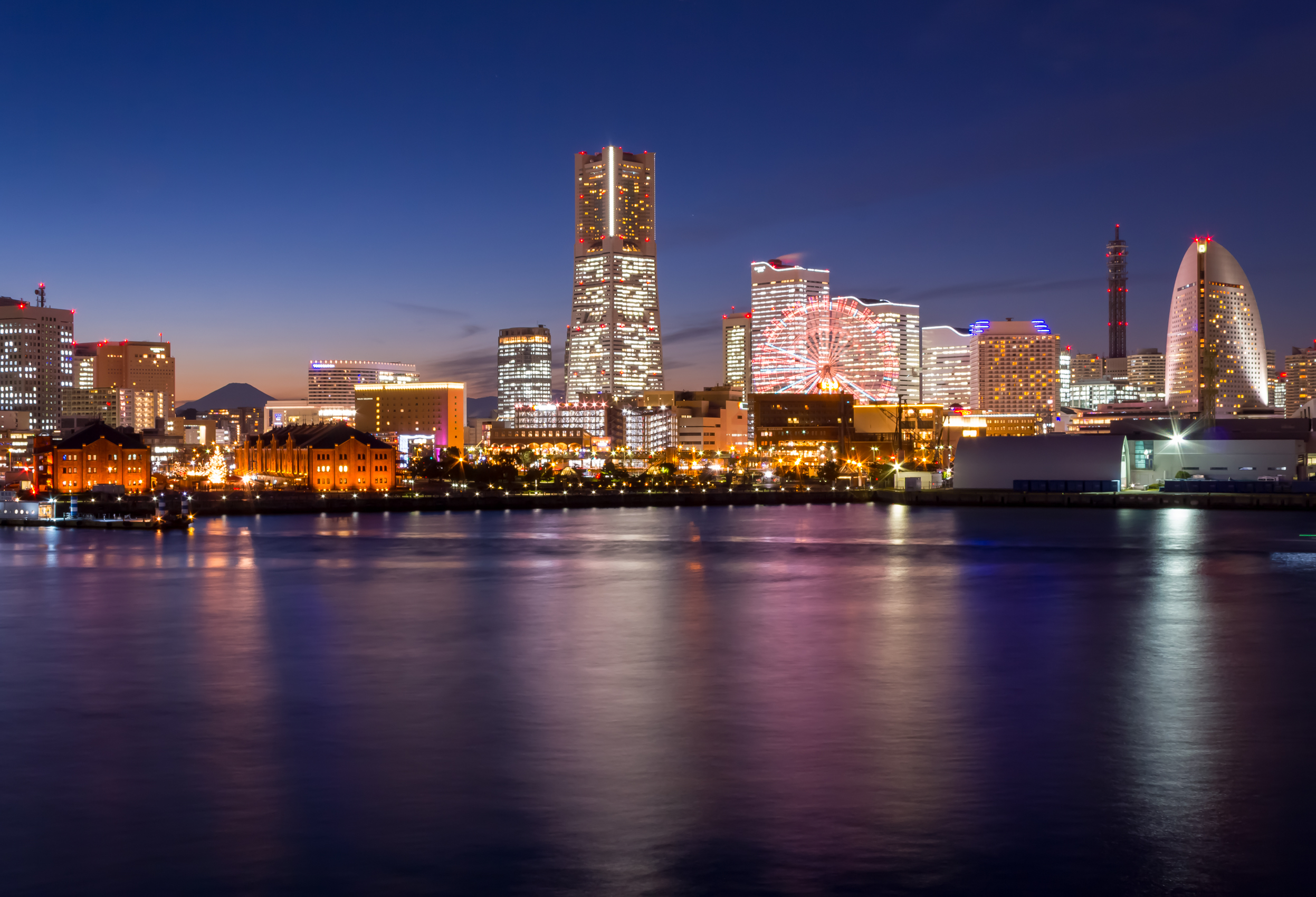
Shipyards, wharves, railyards, and warehouses in the dockland area were redeveloped into Minato Mirai 21.

During the American occupation, Yokohama was a major transshipment base for American supplies and personnel, especially during the Korean War. After the occupation, most local U.S. naval activity moved from Yokohama to an American base in nearby Yokosuka.

Four years after the Treaty of San Francisco was signed, the city was designated by government ordinance on September 1, 1956. The city's tram and trolleybus system was abolished in 1972, the same year as the opening of the first line of Yokohama Municipal Subway. Construction of Minato Mirai 21 ("Port Future 21"), a major urban development project on reclaimed land started in 1983, nicknamed the "Philadelphia and Boston of the Orient" was compared to Center City, Philadelphia and Downtown Boston located in the East Coast of the United States. Minato Mirai 21 hosted the Yokohama Exotic Showcase in 1989, which saw the first public operation of maglev trains in Japan and the opening of Cosmo Clock 21, then the tallest Ferris wheel in the world. The 860-metre-long (2,820 ft) Yokohama Bay Bridge opened in the same year. In 1993, Minato Mirai 21 saw the opening of the Yokohama Landmark Tower, the second-tallest building in Japan.

The 2002 FIFA World Cup final was held in June at the International Stadium Yokohama. In 2009, the city marked the 150th anniversary of the opening of the port and the 120th anniversary of the commencement of the City Administration. An early part in the commemoration project incorporated the Fourth Tokyo International Conference on African Development (TICAD IV), which was held in Yokohama in May 2008. In November 2010, Yokohama hosted the Asia-Pacific Economic Cooperation (APEC) meeting.

== Geography ==
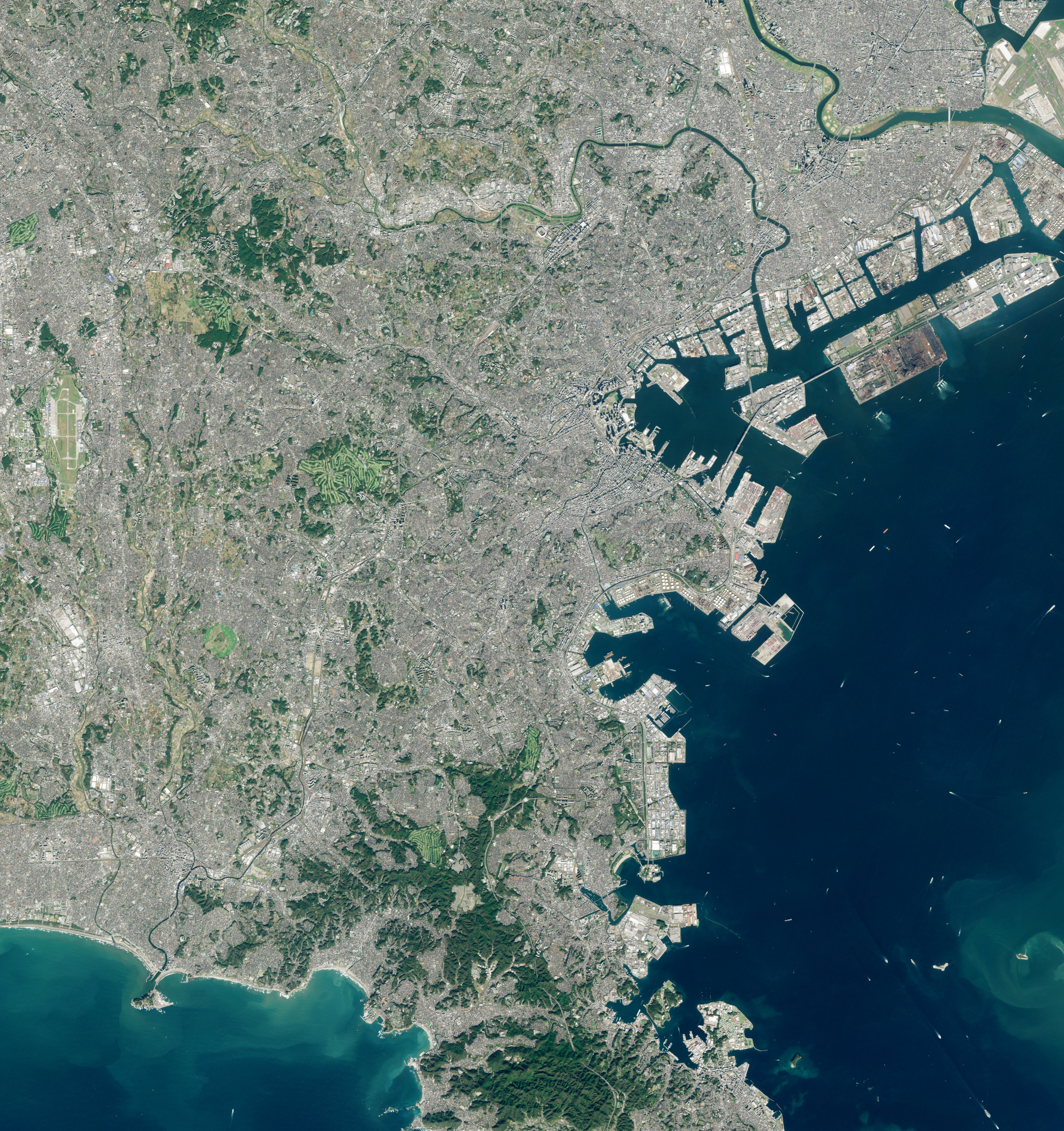
Sentinel-2 image of Yokohama (2020)

=== Topography ===
Yokohama has a total area of 437.38 km^{2} (168.87 mi^{2}) at an elevation of 5 metres (16 ft) above sea level. It is the capital of Kanagawa Prefecture, bordered to the east by Tokyo Bay and located in the middle of the Kantō plain. The city is surrounded by hills and the characteristic mountain system of the island of Honshū, so its growth has been limited and it has had to gain ground from the sea. This also affects the population density, one of the highest in Japan with 8,500 inhabitants per km^{2}.

The highest points within the urban boundary are Omaruyama (156 m [512 ft]) and Mount Enkaizan (153 m [502 ft]). The main river is the Tsurumi River, which begins in the Tama Hills and empties into the Pacific Ocean.

These municipalities surround Yokohama: Kawasaki, Yokosuka, Zushi, Kamakura, Fujisawa, Yamato, Machida.

=== Geology ===
The city is very prone to natural phenomena such as earthquakes and tropical cyclones because the island of Honshū has a high level of seismic activity, being in the middle of the Pacific Ring of Fire.

Most seismic movements are of low intensity and are generally not perceived by people. However, Yokohama has experienced two major tremors that reflect the evolution of earthquake engineering: the 1923 Great Kantō earthquake devastated the city and caused more than 100,000 fatalities throughout the region, while the 2011 Tōhoku earthquake and tsunami, with its epicenter on the east coast, was felt in the locality but only material damage was lamented because most buildings were already prepared to withstand them.

=== Climate ===
Yokohama features a humid subtropical climate (Köppen: Cfa) with hot, humid summers and chilly winters. Weatherwise, Yokohama has a pattern of rain, clouds and sun, although in winter, it is surprisingly sunny due to influence of the Siberian High and being on the relative rain shadow of the Japanese Alps. Frosts at winter are not frequent. Summers can be very oppressive due to heat and humidity combination. The coldest temperature was on 24 January 1927 when −8.2 °C (17.2 °F) was reached, whilst the hottest day was 6 August 2025 at 38.1 °C (100.6 °F). The highest monthly rainfall was in October 2004 with 761.5 millimetres (30.0 in), closely followed by July 1941 with 753.4 millimetres (29.66 in), whilst December and January have recorded no measurable precipitation three times each.

Climate data for Yokohama (1991–2020 normals, extremes 1896–present)
Month	Jan	Feb	Mar	Apr	May	Jun	Jul	Aug	Sep	Oct	Nov	Dec	Year
Record high °C (°F)	20.8 (69.4)	24.8 (76.6)	26.9 (80.4)	28.7 (83.7)	31.3 (88.3)	36.1 (97.0)	37.3 (99.1)	38.1 (100.6)	36.2 (97.2)	32.4 (90.3)	27.3 (81.1)	24.5 (76.1)	38.1 (100.6)
Mean maximum °C (°F)	16.0 (60.8)	18.6 (65.5)	21.3 (70.3)	25.1 (77.2)	28.5 (83.3)	31.1 (88.0)	34.5 (94.1)	35.0 (95.0)	32.7 (90.9)	28.3 (82.9)	22.7 (72.9)	18.0 (64.4)	35.4 (95.7)
Mean daily maximum °C (°F)	10.2 (50.4)	10.8 (51.4)	14.0 (57.2)	18.9 (66.0)	23.1 (73.6)	25.5 (77.9)	29.4 (84.9)	31.0 (87.8)	27.3 (81.1)	22.0 (71.6)	17.1 (62.8)	12.5 (54.5)	20.2 (68.4)
Daily mean °C (°F)	6.1 (43.0)	6.7 (44.1)	9.7 (49.5)	14.5 (58.1)	18.8 (65.8)	21.8 (71.2)	25.6 (78.1)	27.0 (80.6)	23.7 (74.7)	18.5 (65.3)	13.4 (56.1)	8.7 (47.7)	16.2 (61.2)
Mean daily minimum °C (°F)	2.7 (36.9)	3.1 (37.6)	6.0 (42.8)	10.7 (51.3)	15.5 (59.9)	19.1 (66.4)	22.9 (73.2)	24.3 (75.7)	21.0 (69.8)	15.7 (60.3)	10.1 (50.2)	5.2 (41.4)	13.0 (55.4)
Mean minimum °C (°F)	−0.6 (30.9)	−0.5 (31.1)	1.4 (34.5)	4.5 (40.1)	10.7 (51.3)	15.0 (59.0)	19.0 (66.2)	20.2 (68.4)	15.0 (59.0)	11.0 (51.8)	5.3 (41.5)	1.3 (34.3)	−1.1 (30.0)
Record low °C (°F)	−8.2 (17.2)	−6.8 (19.8)	−4.6 (23.7)	−0.5 (31.1)	3.6 (38.5)	9.2 (48.6)	13.3 (55.9)	15.5 (59.9)	11.2 (52.2)	2.2 (36.0)	−2.4 (27.7)	−5.6 (21.9)	−8.2 (17.2)
Average precipitation mm (inches)	64.7 (2.55)	64.7 (2.55)	139.5 (5.49)	143.1 (5.63)	152.6 (6.01)	188.8 (7.43)	182.5 (7.19)	139.0 (5.47)	241.5 (9.51)	240.4 (9.46)	107.6 (4.24)	66.4 (2.61)	1,730.8 (68.14)
Average snowfall cm (inches)	4 (1.6)	4 (1.6)	0 (0)	0 (0)	0 (0)	0 (0)	0 (0)	0 (0)	0 (0)	0 (0)	0 (0)	0 (0)	9 (3.5)
Average precipitation days (≥ 0.5 mm)	5.7	6.3	11.0	10.7	11.1	13.5	12.0	8.8	12.7	12.1	8.6	6.2	118.8
Average relative humidity (%)	53	54	60	65	70	78	78	76	76	71	65	57	67
Mean monthly sunshine hours	192.7	167.2	168.8	181.2	187.4	135.9	170.9	206.4	141.2	137.3	151.1	178.1	2,018.3
Source: Japan Meteorological Agency

== Demographics ==
Historical population
Year	Pop.	±%
1870	64,602	—
1880	72,630	+12.4%
1890	132,627	+82.6%
1900	196,653	+48.3%
1910	403,303	+105.1%
1920	422,942	+4.9%
1930	620,306	+46.7%
1940	968,091	+56.1%
1950	951,188	−1.7%
1960	1,375,710	+44.6%
1970	2,238,264	+62.7%
1980	2,773,674	+23.9%
1990	3,220,331	+16.1%
2000	3,426,651	+6.4%
2010	3,688,773	+7.6%
2020	3,777,491	+2.4%

The city's population is 3,772,726 as of 1 June 2024, making it the second-most populated city in the country after Tokyo's 23 special wards. Among Yokohama's 18 wards, the most inhabited was Kohoku with a population of 364,760, followed by Aoba (308,379), Tsurumi (297,230), and Totsuka (282,601). In terms of population density, Nishi and Minami are the most densely populated, with a per square kilometre population exceeding 15,000. Of Yokohama's population, 1,548,077 work outside the city, while 1,226,618 workers commute from outside the city. As these numbers suggest, some of Yokohama's residential areas are commuter suburbs (or "bed towns" as known in Japanese) for those who work in other major cities, primarily Tokyo.

=== Immigration ===
As of June 2024, Yokohama's population includes 121,042 foreign nationals, making up 3.2% of the total population, with the number having grown significantly in recent years. While all three countries with the number of nationals living in Yokohama as citizens exceeding 10,000 are all in Asia (China, South Korea, Vietnam), other major countries of origin for Yokohama's non-Japanese residents include Brazil (2,823), the United States (2,793), Peru (1,312), the United Kingdom (840), and Germany (770). There is no official survey of the citizens' countries of birth, hence these numbers do not include naturalized citizens, but they include foreign nationals born outside their country of citizenship.

== Administration ==
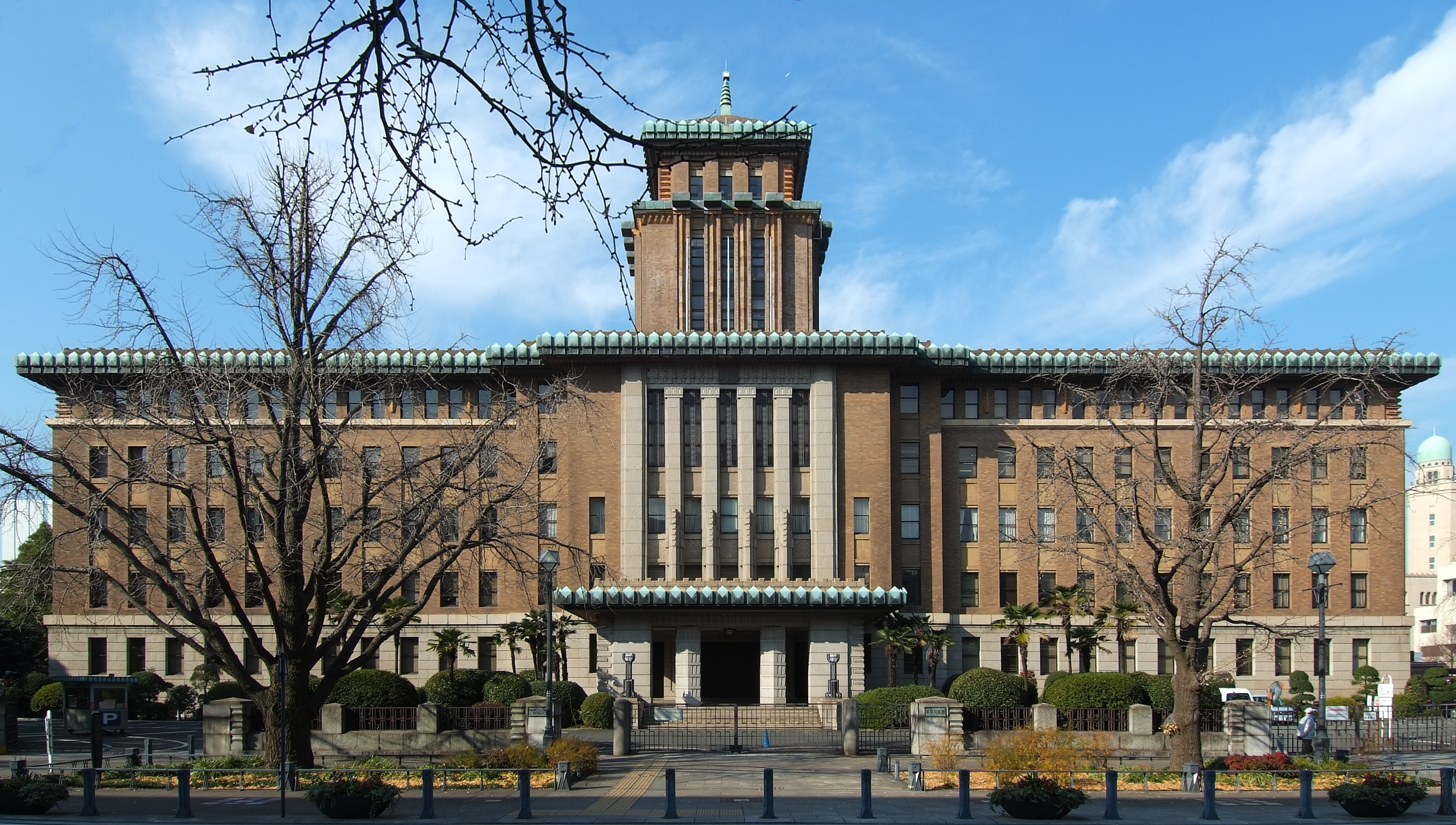
Kanagawa Prefectural Office

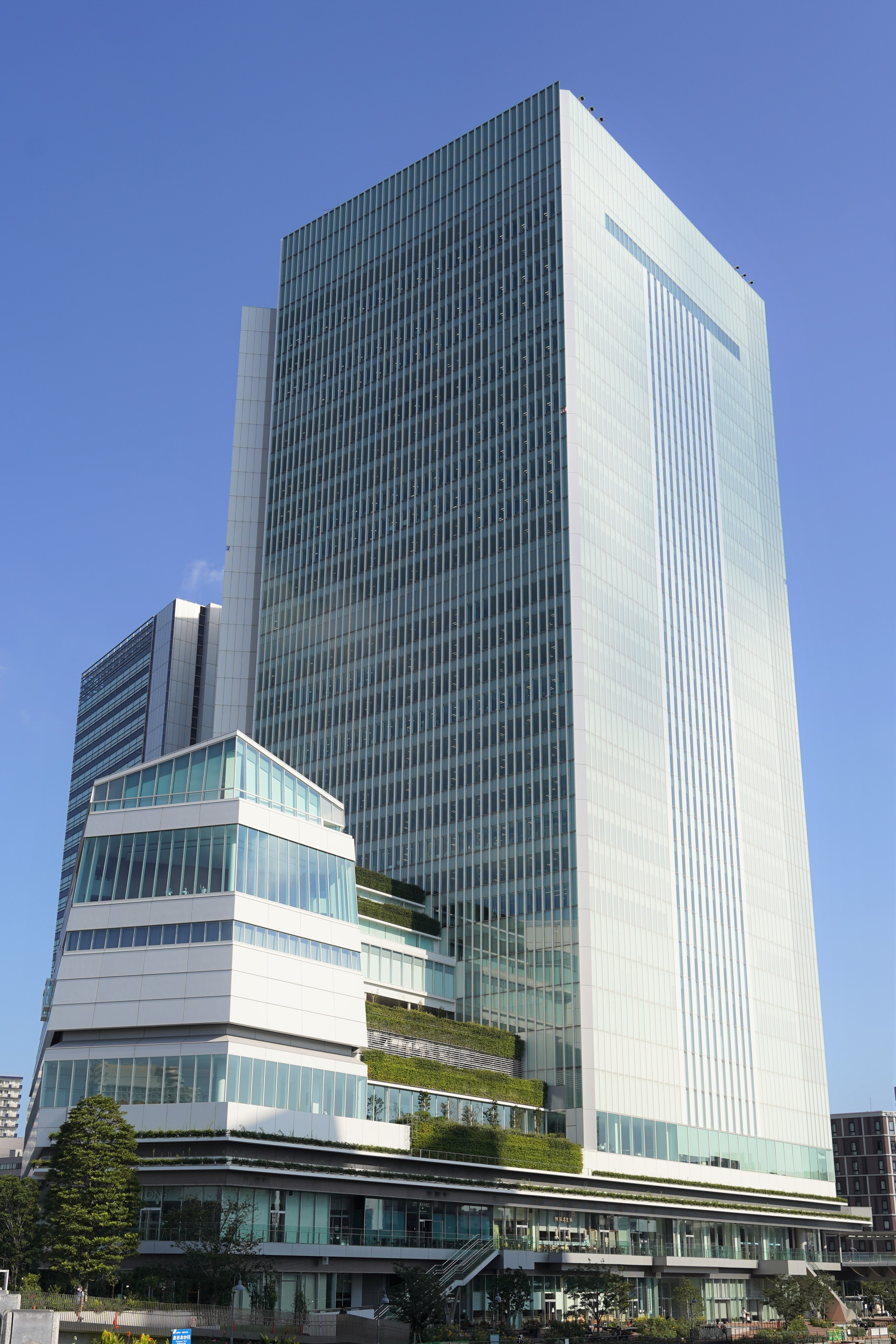
Yokohama City Hall

=== Municipal administration ===
Yokohama is one of the 20 designated cities in the country, which means the city has many powers that usually belong to prefectural governments, while having wards as subdivisions with administrative functions. Yokohama city consists of 18 wards, with its government seat in Naka Ward. The Yokohama City Council consists of 86 members elected from a total of 18 Wards. The LDP has minority control with 36 seats. The incumbent mayor is Takeharu Yamanaka, who defeated his predecessor Fumiko Hayashi in the 2021 Yokohama mayoral election.

=== Wards ===
Yokohama has 18 wards (ku):

Wards of Yokohama
	Place Name					Map of Yokohama
	Rōmaji	Kanji	Population	Land area in km^{2}	Pop. density per km^{2}	
1	Aoba-ku	青葉区	302,643	35.14	8,610	A map of Yokohama's Wards
2	Asahi-ku	旭区	249,045	32.77	7,600	A map of Yokohama's Wards
3	Hodogaya-ku	保土ヶ谷区	205,887	21.81	9,400	A map of Yokohama's Wards
4	Isogo-ku	磯子区	163,406	19.17	8,520	A map of Yokohama's Wards
5	Izumi-ku	泉区	155,674	23.51	6,620	A map of Yokohama's Wards
6	Kanagawa-ku	神奈川区	230,401	23.88	9,650	A map of Yokohama's Wards
7	Kanazawa-ku	金沢区	209,565	31.01	6,760	A map of Yokohama's Wards
8	Kōhoku-ku	港北区	332,488	31.40	10,588	A map of Yokohama's Wards
9	Kōnan-ku	港南区	221,536	19.87	11,500	A map of Yokohama's Wards
10	Midori-ku	緑区	176,038	25.42	6,900	A map of Yokohama's Wards
11	Minami-ku	南区	197,019	12.67	15,500	A map of Yokohama's Wards
12	Naka-ku (administrative center)	中区	146,563	20.86	7,030	A map of Yokohama's Wards
13	Nishi-ku	西区	93,210	7.04	13,210	A map of Yokohama's Wards
14	Sakae-ku	栄区	124,845	18.55	6,750	A map of Yokohama's Wards
15	Seya-ku	瀬谷区	126,839	17.11	7,390	A map of Yokohama's Wards
16	Totsuka-ku	戸塚区	274,783	35.70	7,697	A map of Yokohama's Wards
17	Tsurumi-ku	鶴見区	270,433	33.23	8,140	A map of Yokohama's Wards
18	Tsuzuki-ku	都筑区	211,455	27.93	7,535	A map of Yokohama's Wards

== Economy ==
In 2020, Yokohama's total gross regional product was 14.06 trillion yen or US$133 billion, a 1.9 per cent decrease compared to the previous year due to the COVID-19 pandemic. This converts to US$35,107 per citizen, below the national average. A large number of Yokohama's citizens work outside the city (693,064 in 2020), primarily in Tokyo, and the economic value they generate outside the city does not contribute to Yokohama's economic output. The largest contributors to this figure were wholesale and retail (17.8%), healthcare (11.7%), and academic, professional, or technological services (11.0%).

=== Major companies headquartered ===
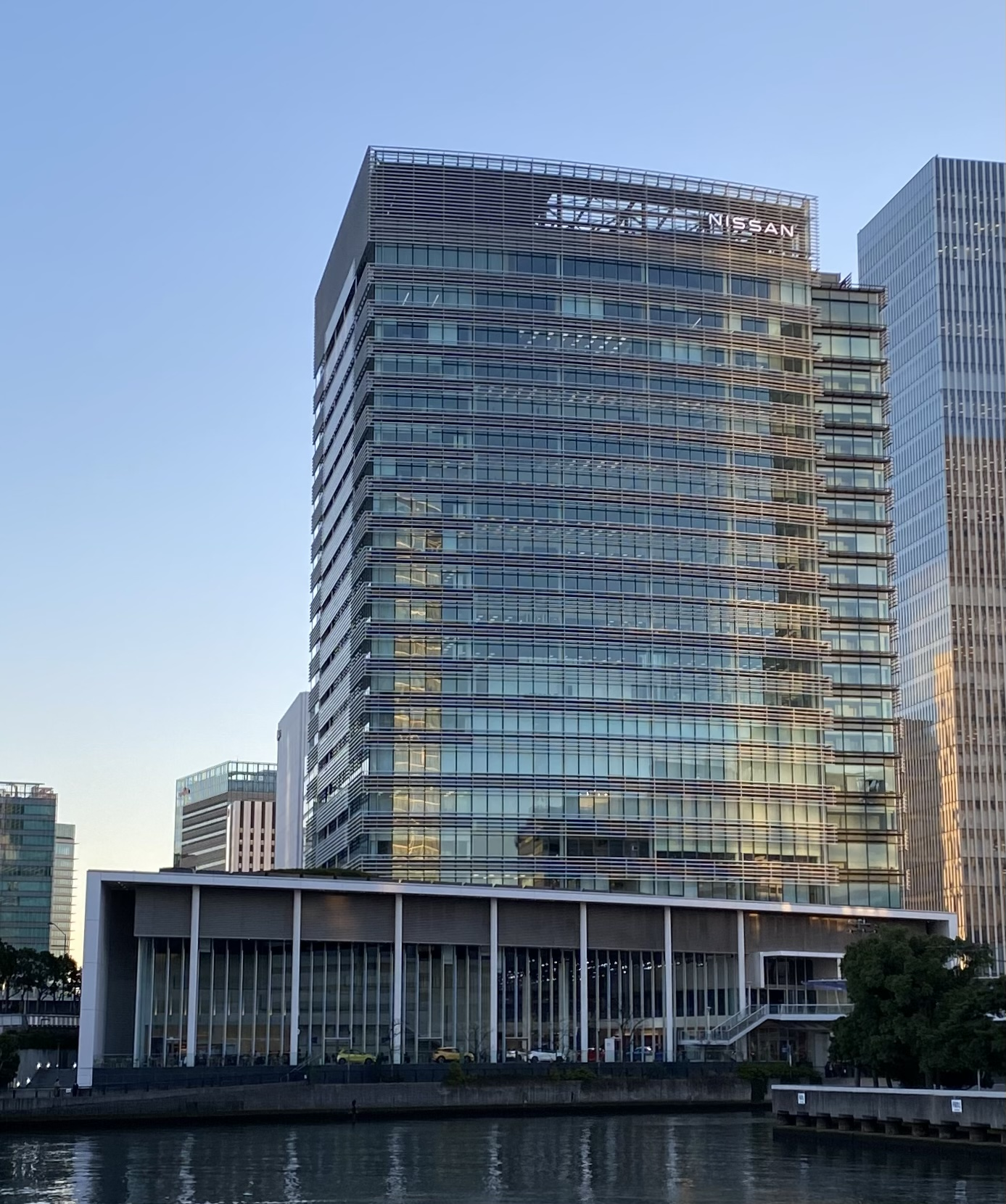
Nissan Global Headquarters in Nishi-ku

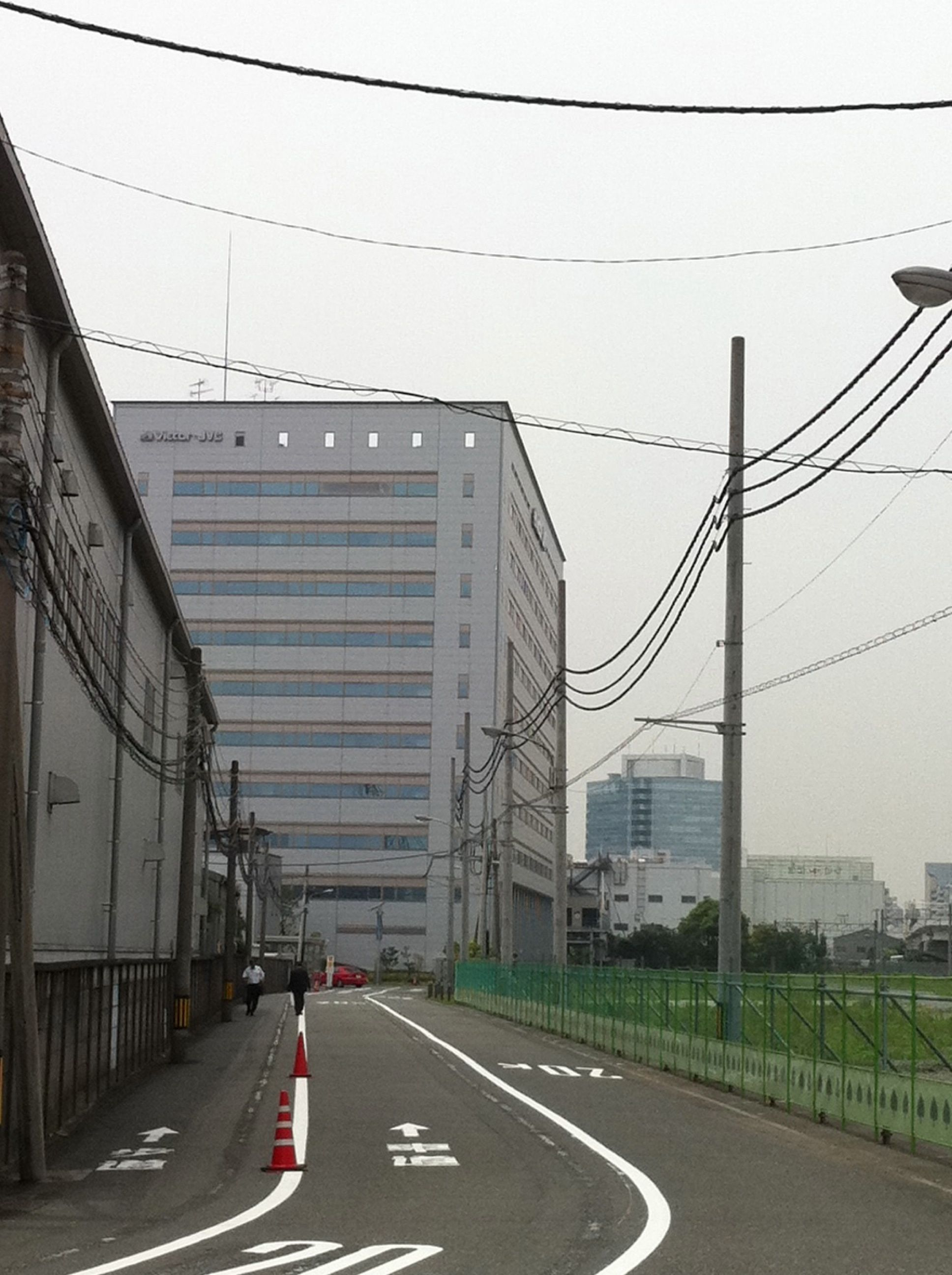
JVCKenwood headquarters in Kanagawa-ku

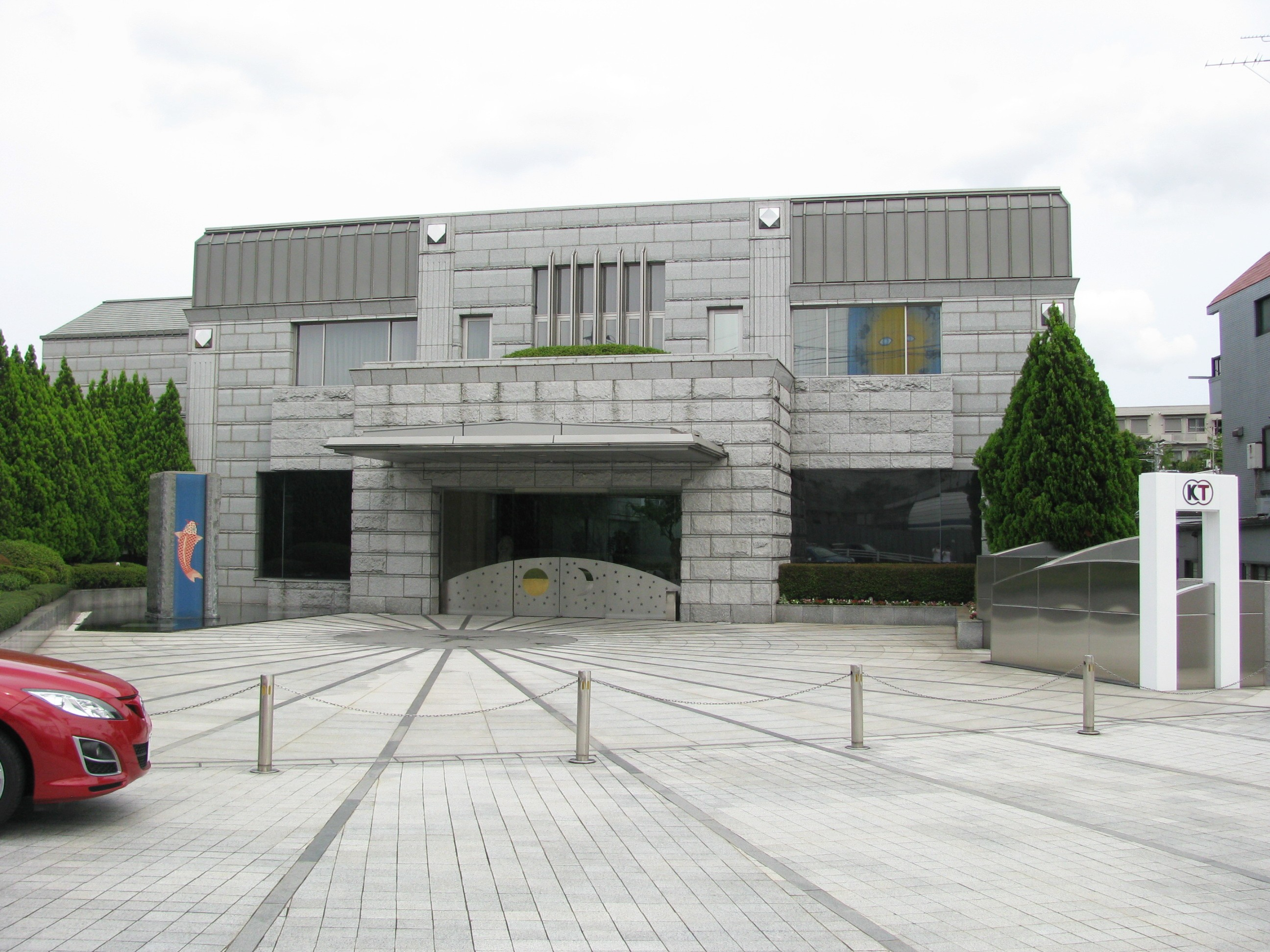
Koei Tecmo headquarters in Kōhoku-ku

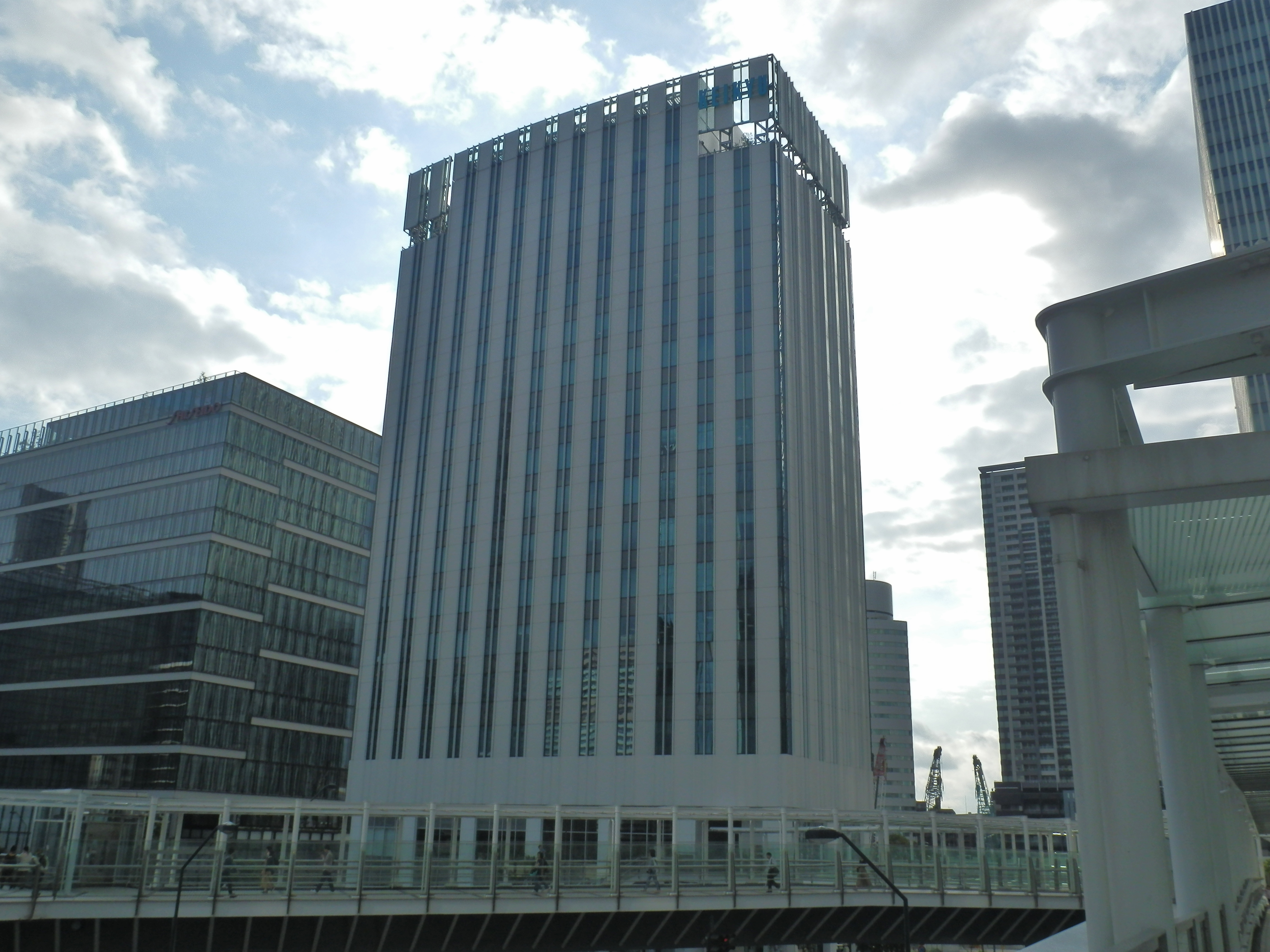
Keikyu Group headquarters in Nishi-ku

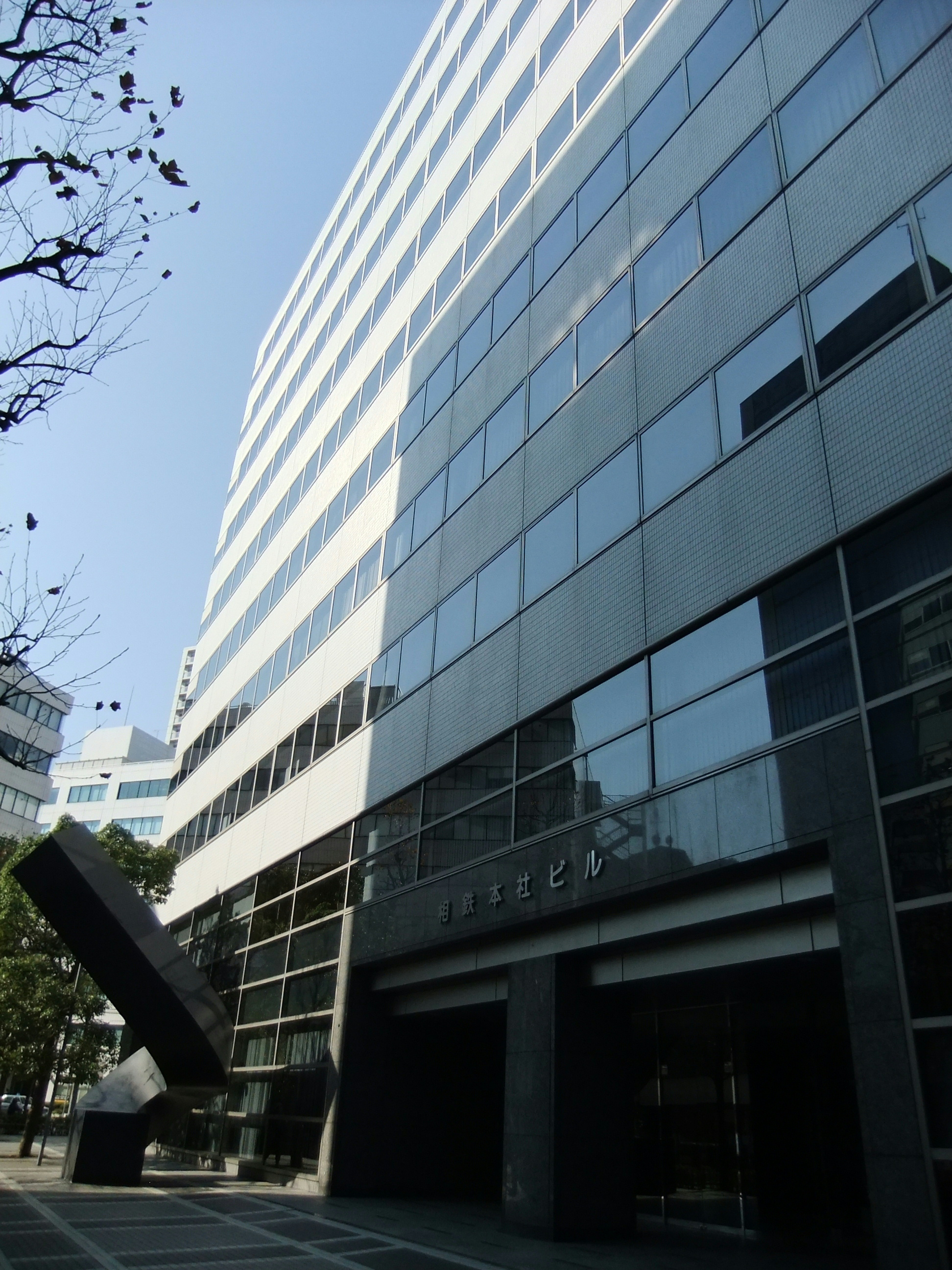
Sotetsu headquarters in Nishi-ku

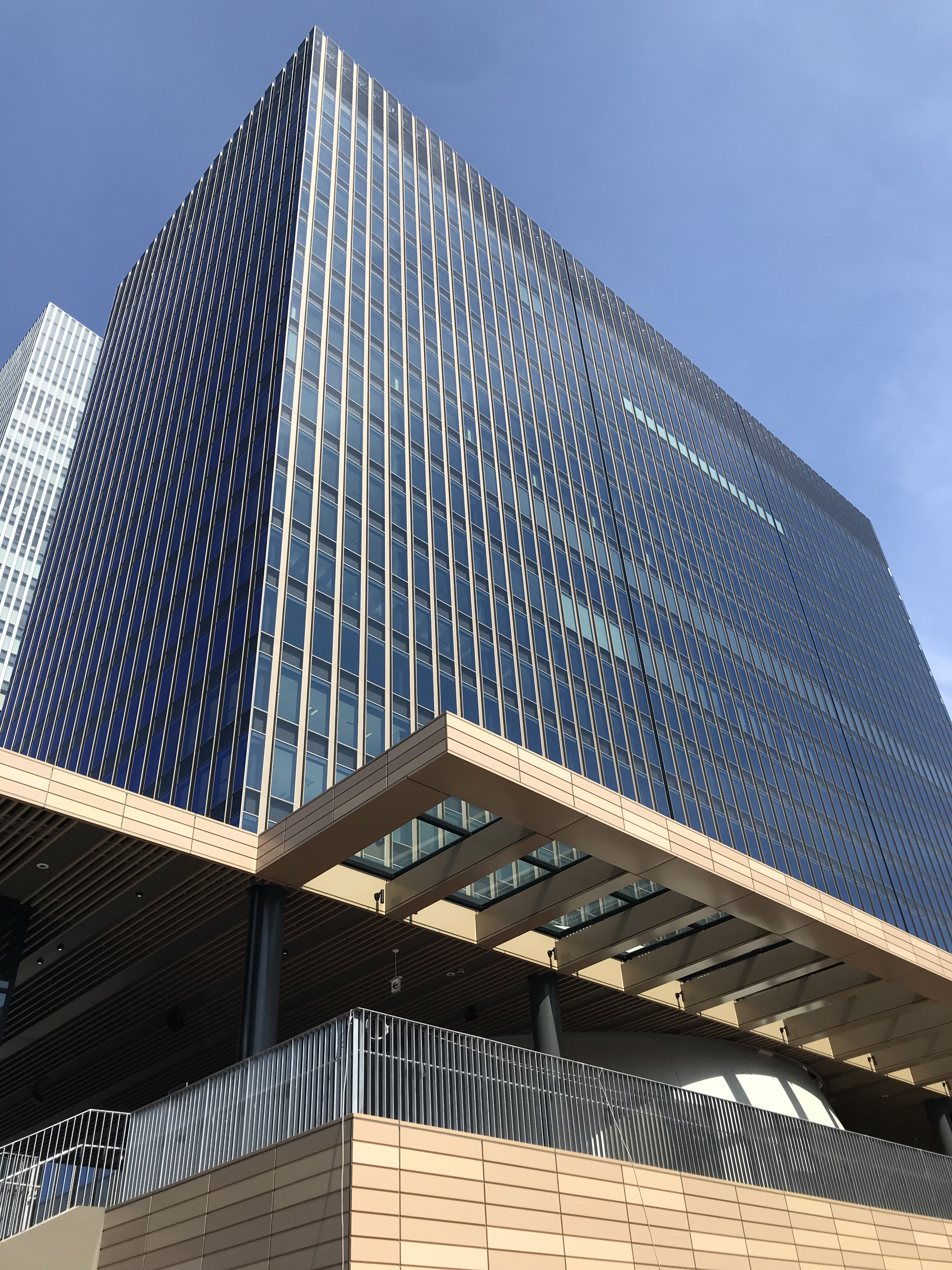
Isuzu headquarters in Nishi-ku

== Culture and sights ==
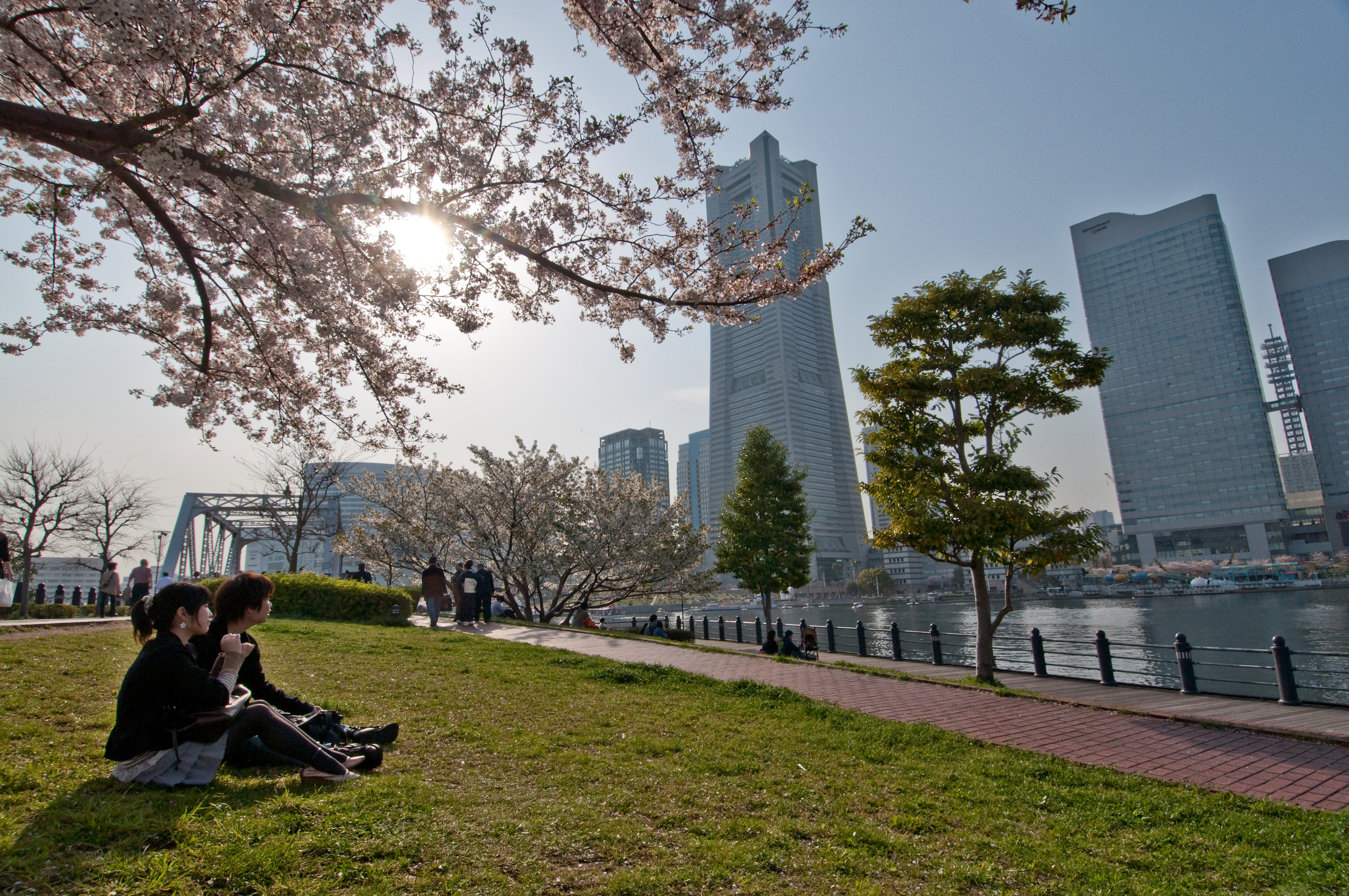
Cherry blossoms on the Kisha-michi Promenade

Yokohama's cultural and tourist sights include:

- Gumyō-ji, oldest temple in the city
- Harbor View Park
- Hikawa Maru, historic passenger and cargo ship
- Kanazawa Bunko, preserves the cultural heritage of the Hōjō clan
- Kishine-Park
- Landmark Tower, 296 m high, third tallest skyscraper in Japan
- Minato Mirai 21
- Nippon Maru, museum ship
- Sankei-en, garden
- Yamashita Park (at the harbor)
- Yokohama Chinatown
- Yokohama Foreign Cemetery
- Yokohama Marine Tower
- Yokohama Stadium (home field of the Yokohama DeNA BayStars)
- Yokohama Three Towers
- Yokohama Triennale
- Zō-no-Hana Terrace (象の鼻テラス)
- Yokohama City Library
- Kanagawa Prefectural Library
- Kōhoku New Town - one of the largest new towns in Japan and also an attractive shopping area in Yokohama.

=== Museums ===
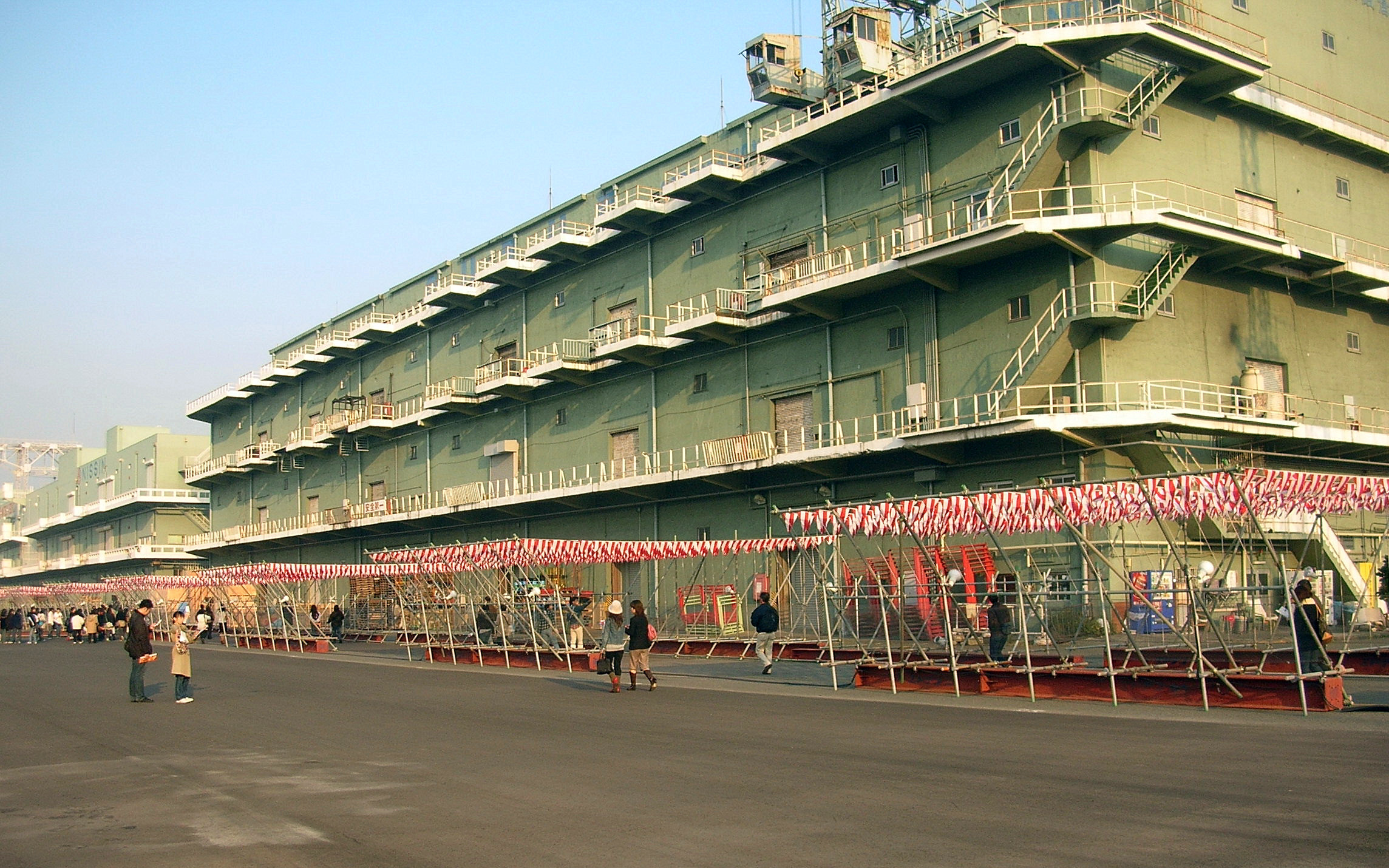
Yokohama Triennale at Yamashita Pier venue

There are 42 museums in the city area, including.

- CupNoodles Museum (Momofuku Andō Instant Ramen Museum): Several-floors of interactive exhibits related to the invention of the Japanese instant noodle soup, including soup kitchens where you can try the culture-specific noodle soups.
- Kanagawa Prefectural Museum of Cultural History: Located in the historic Yokohama Specie Bank building.
- Kanazawa Bunko: Traditional Japanese and Chinese art objects, many dating from the Kamakura period.
- Matsuri Museum: Dedicated to the shrine festivals (Japanese Matsuri) taking place in Yokohama.
- Shin-Yokohama Rāmen Museum: Comprehensive history of ramen and ramen themed food court
- Yokohama Archives of History: Located in the former British Consulate building with exhibits related to port development and the arrival of Matthew Perry.
- Yokohama Museum of Art: Founded in 1989, featuring modern works by well-known international and Japanese artists.
- Yokohama Silk Museum: Exhibits focusing on the production and processing of silk; including many clothes.

=== Gallery ===
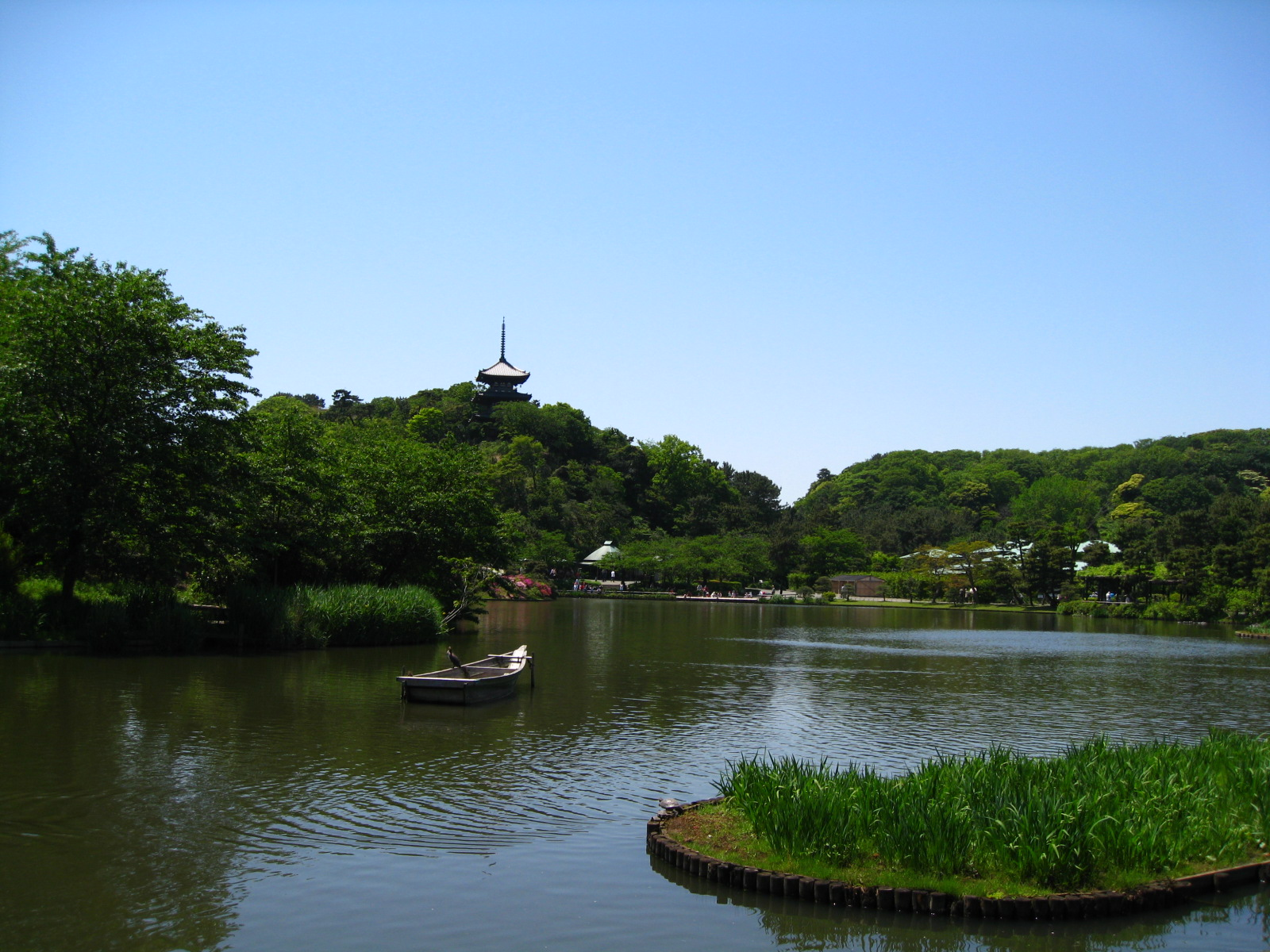
Sankei-en Garden

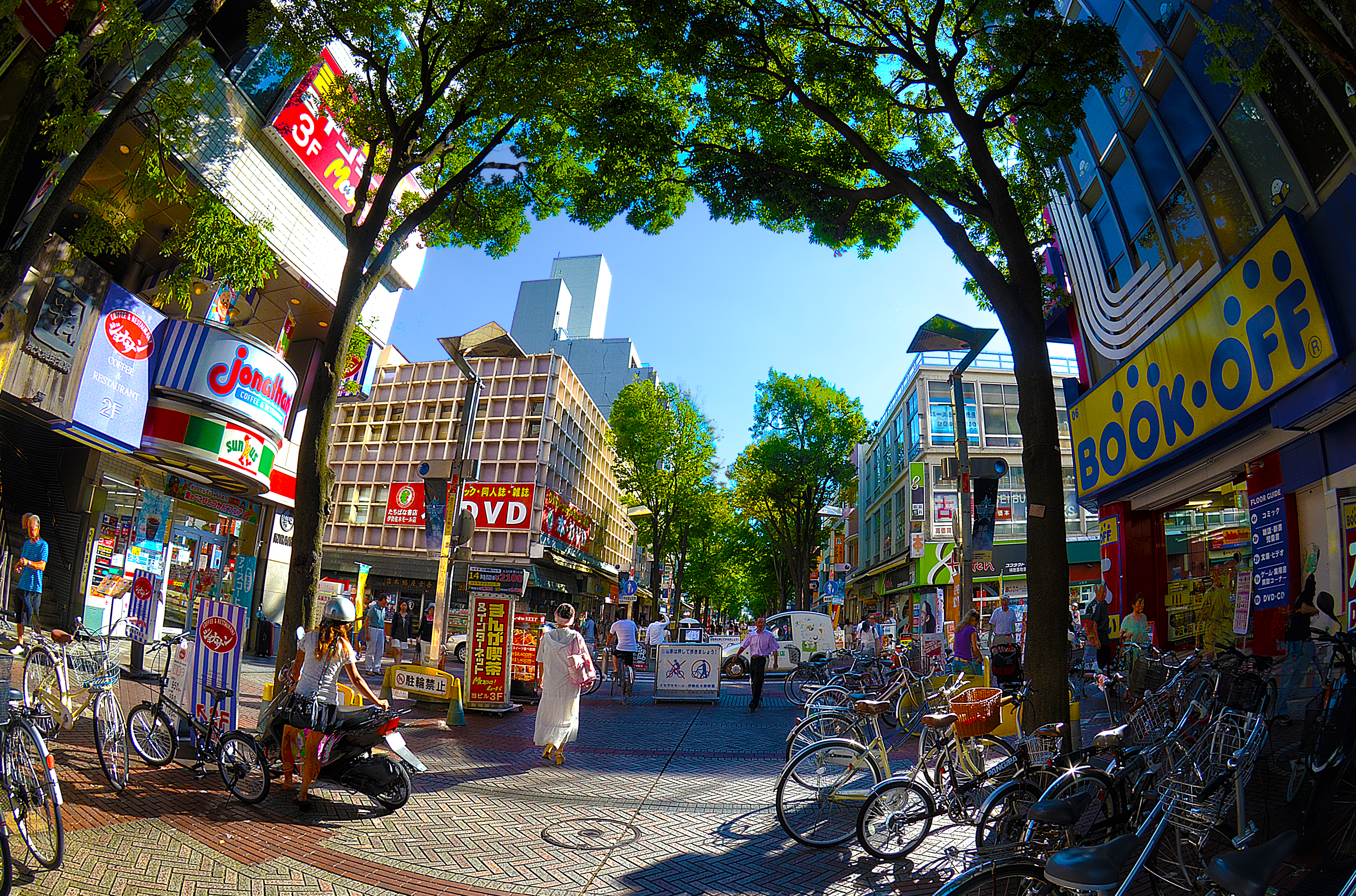
Isezakichō

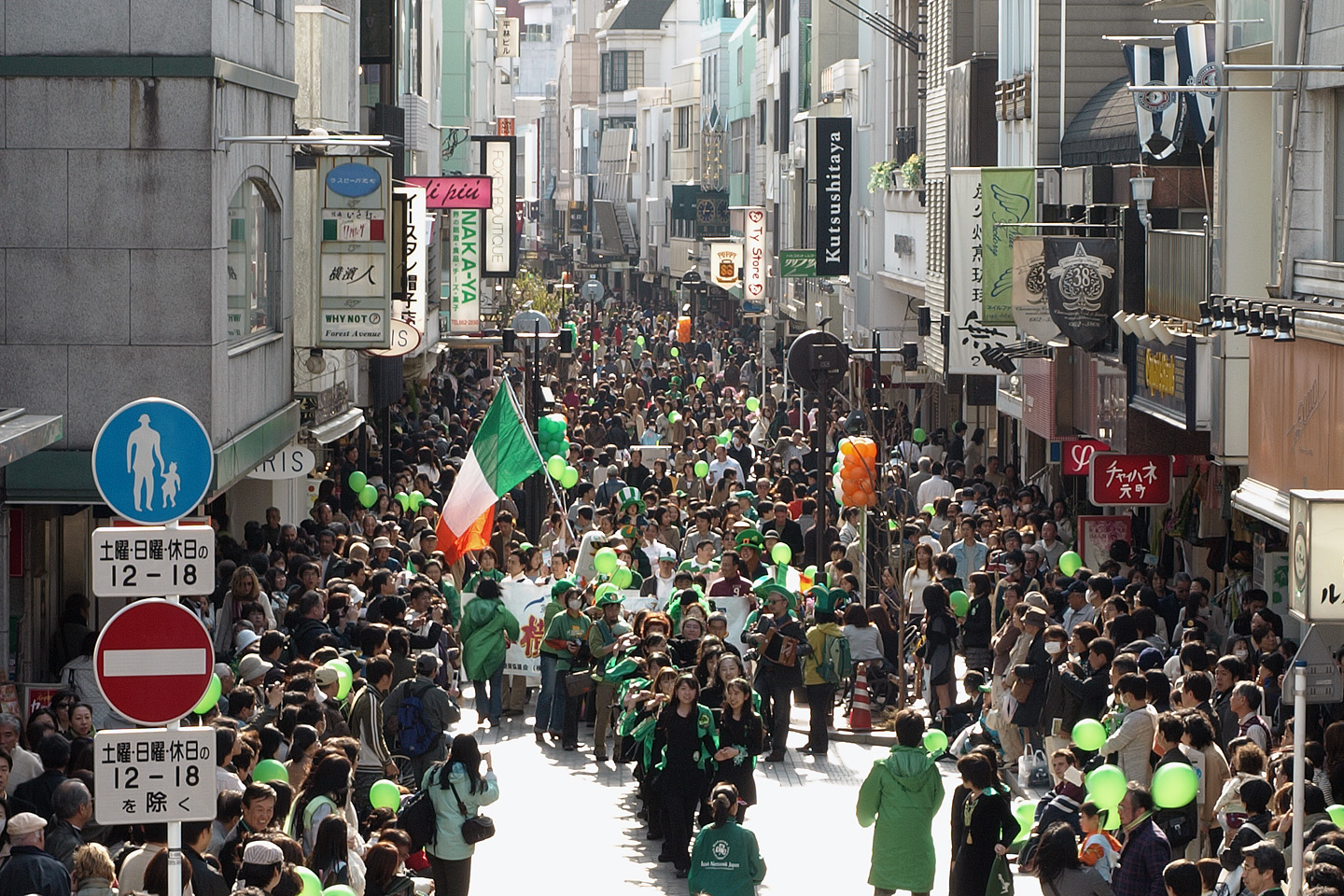
Motomachi

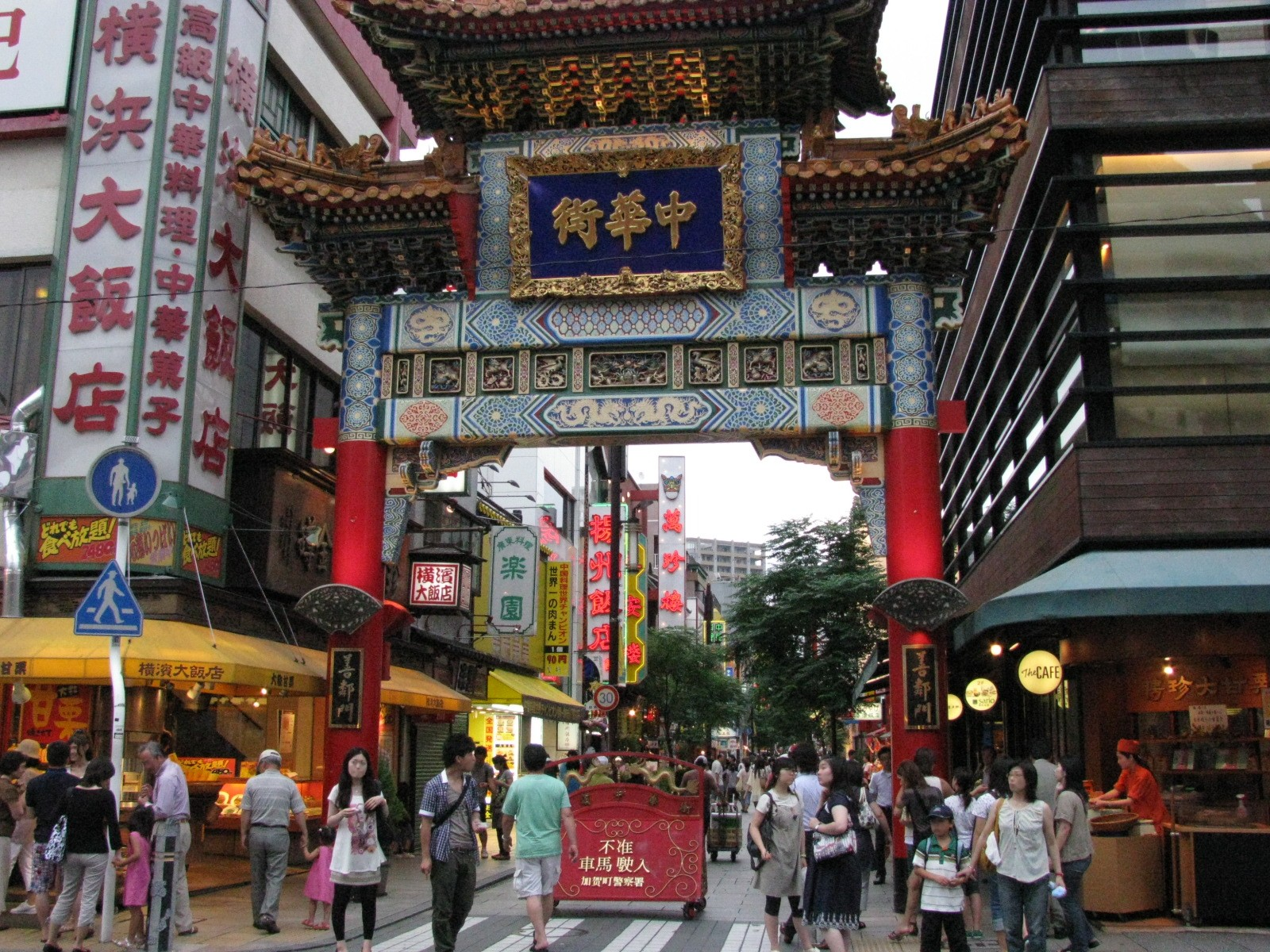
Yokohama Chinatown

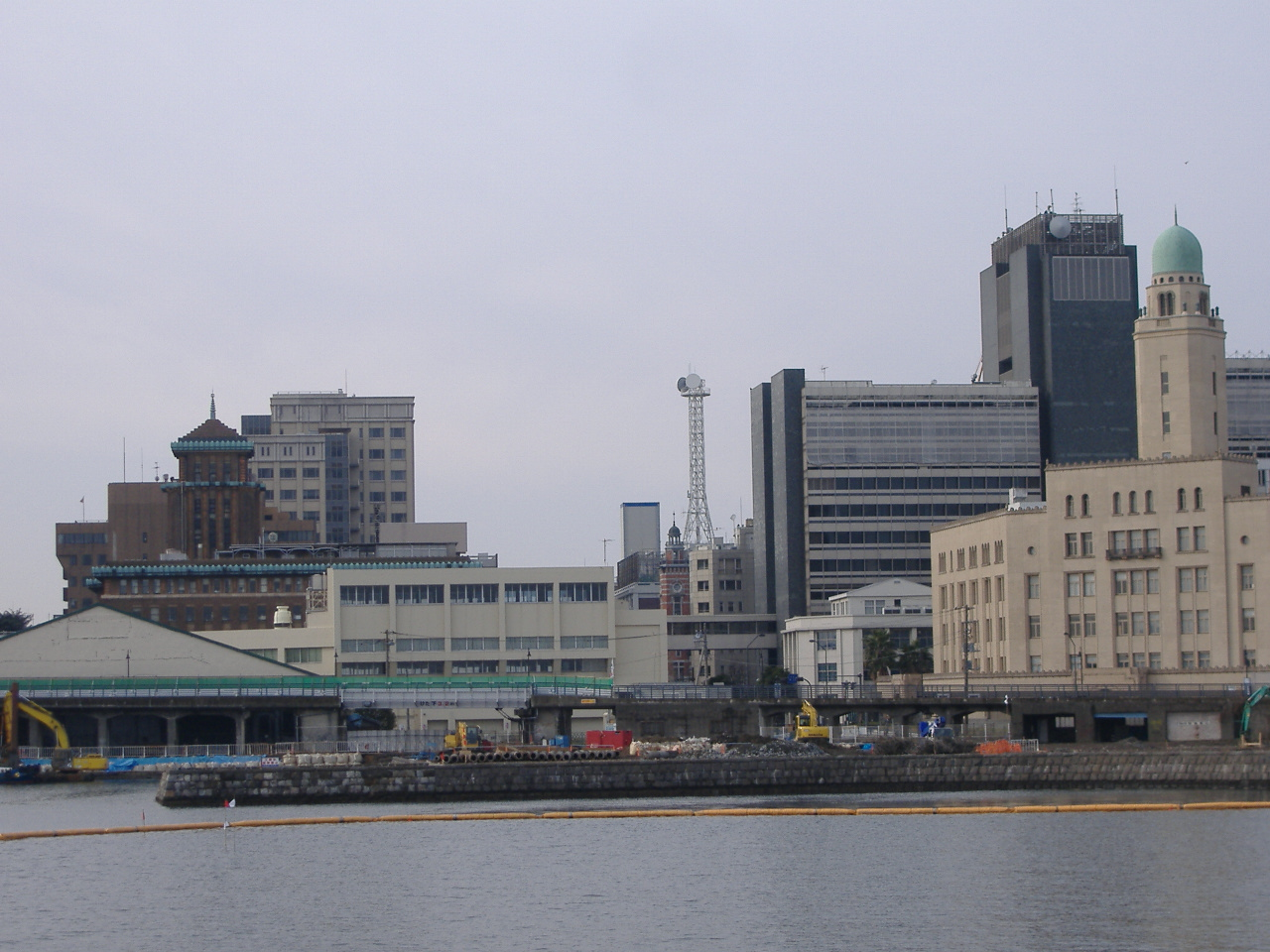
Yokohama Three Towers

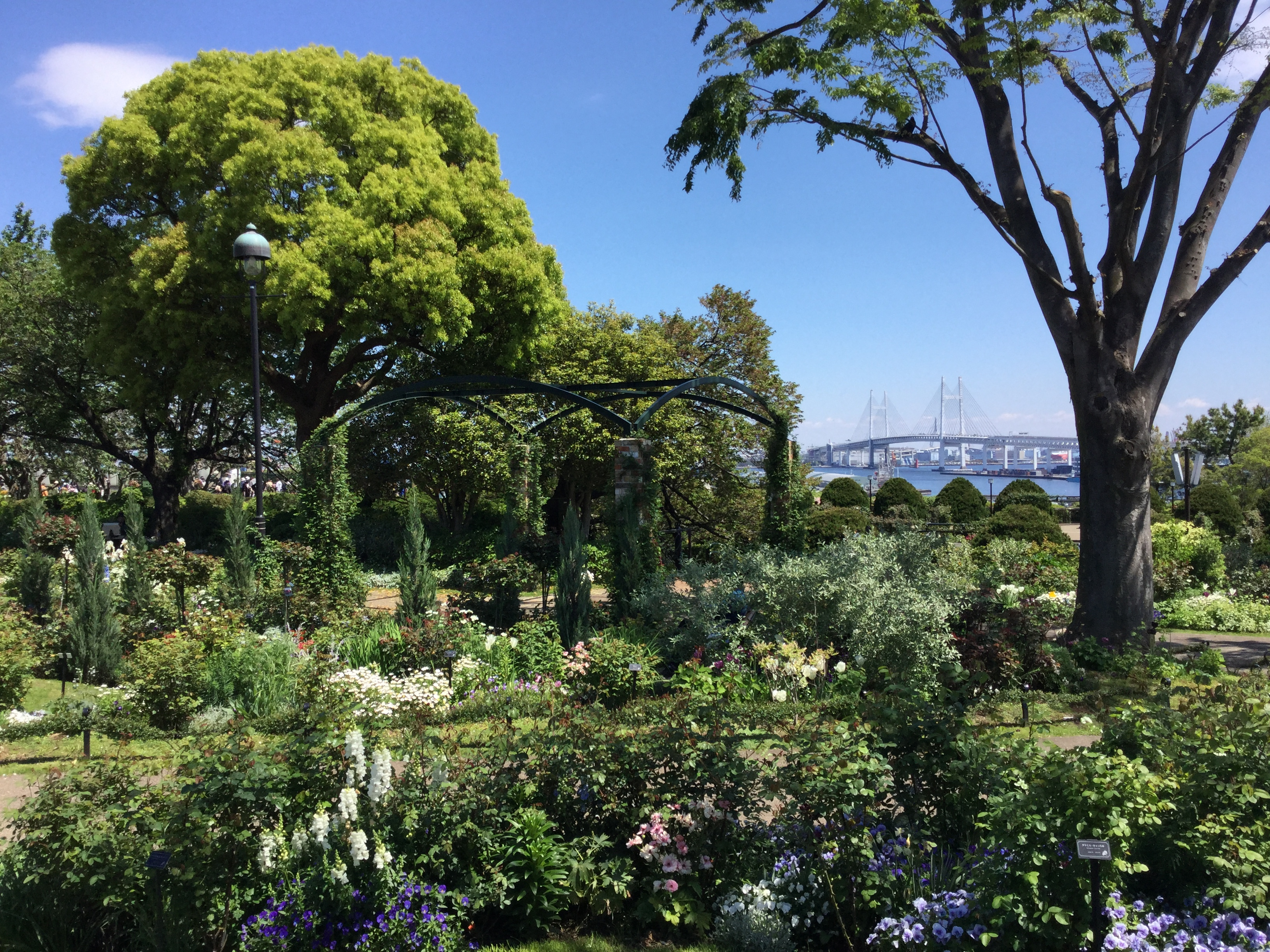
Harbor View Park towards the Yokohama Bay Bridge

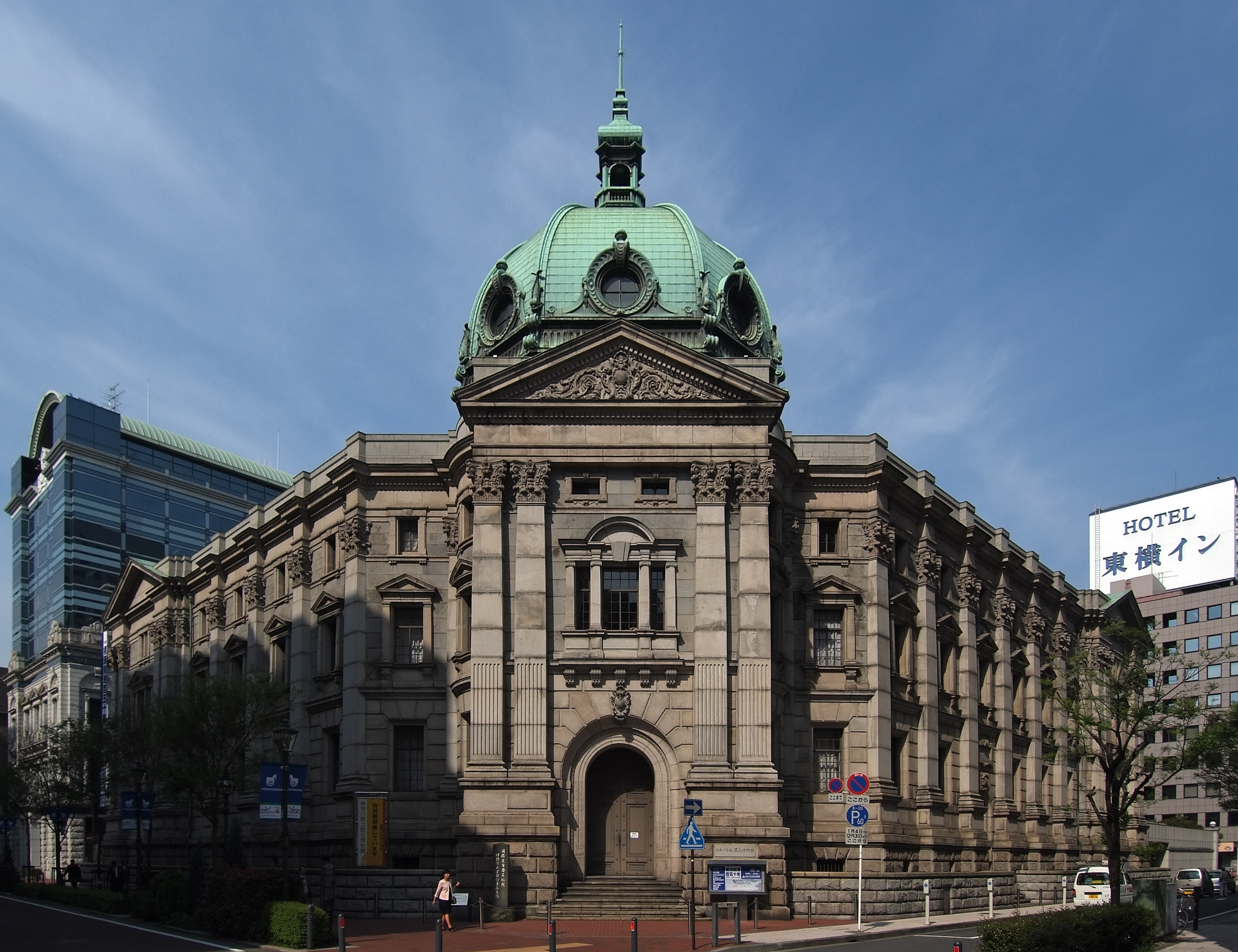
Kanagawa Prefectural Museum of Cultural History

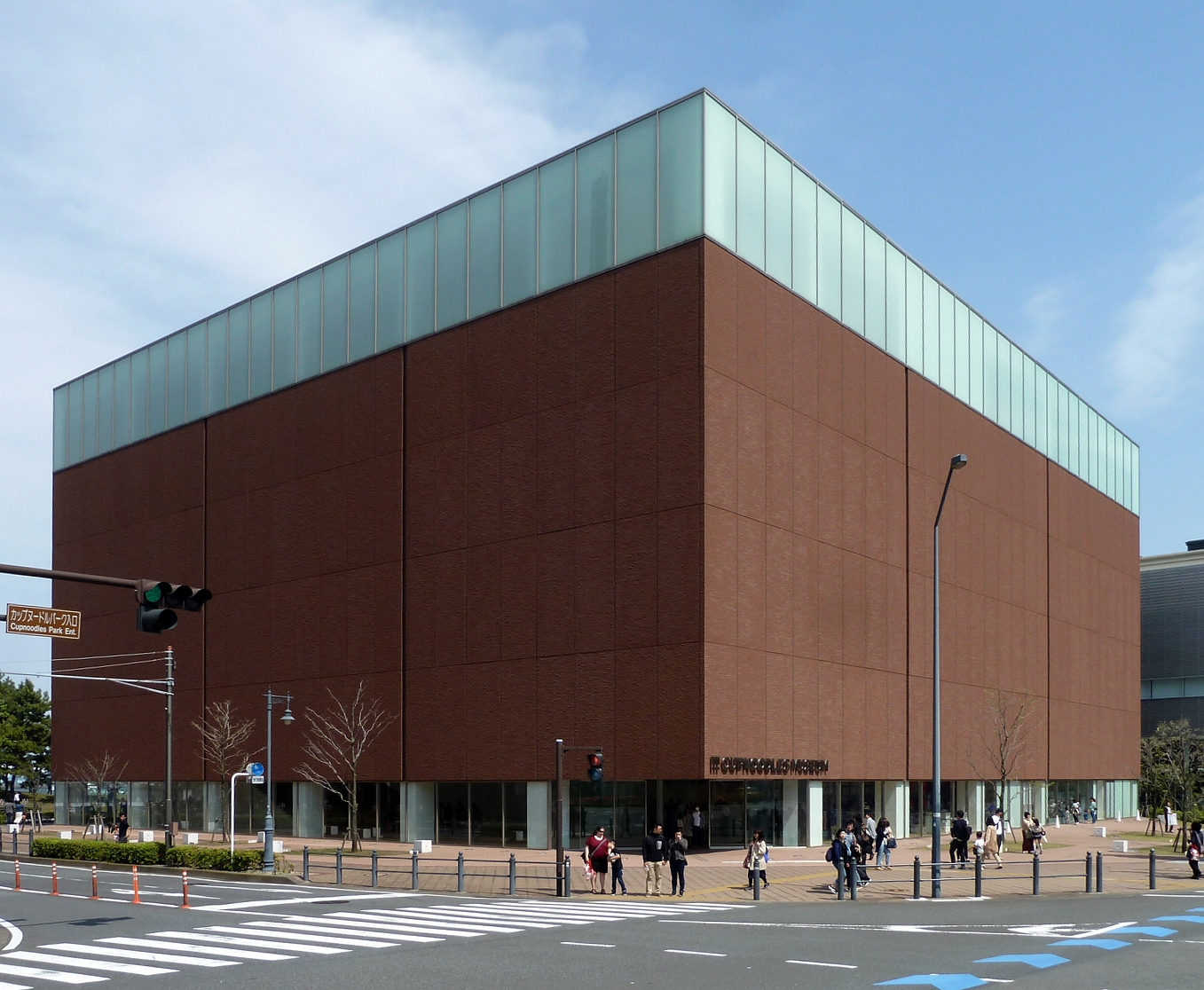
CupNoodles Museum

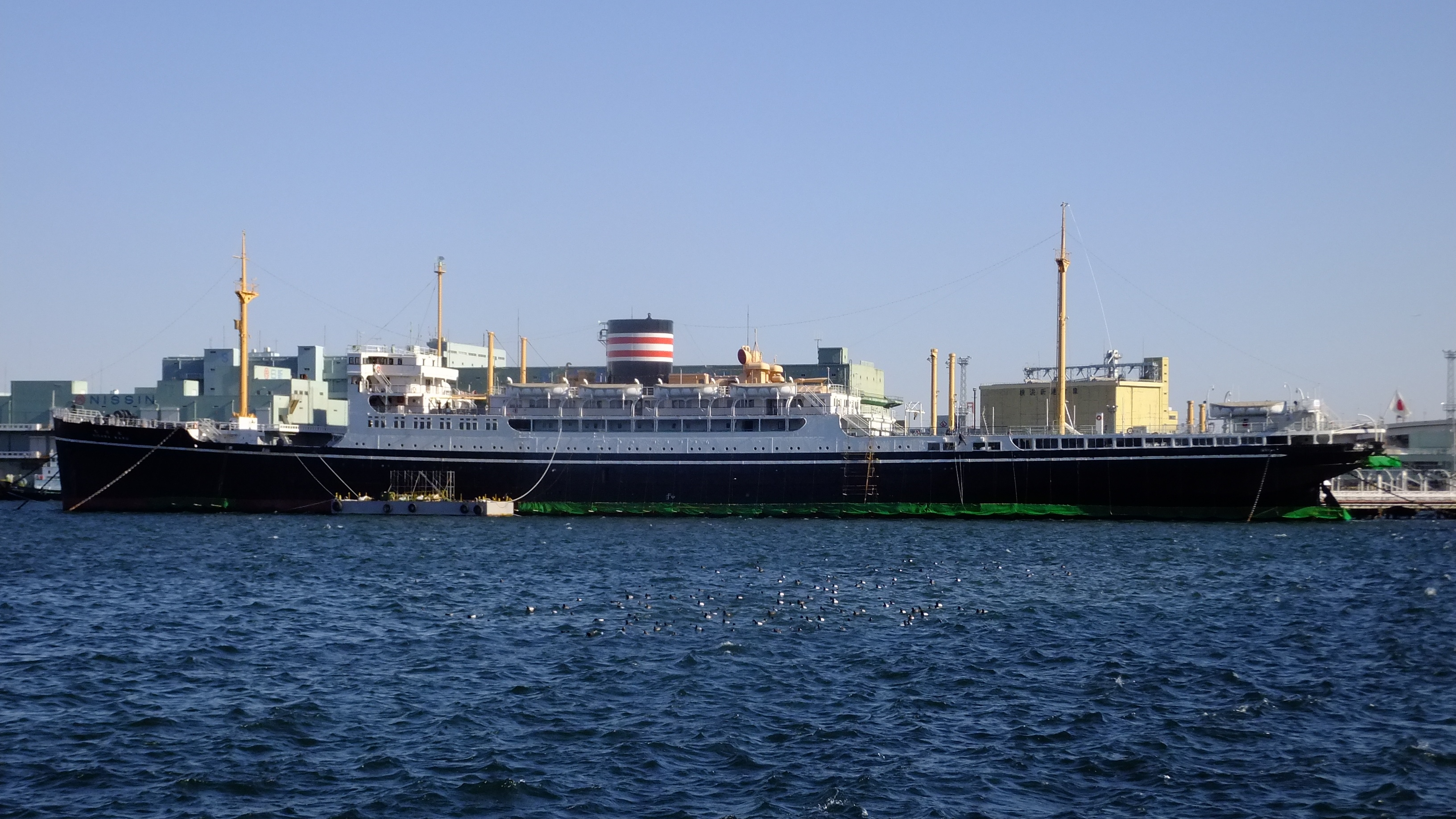
Hikawa Maru

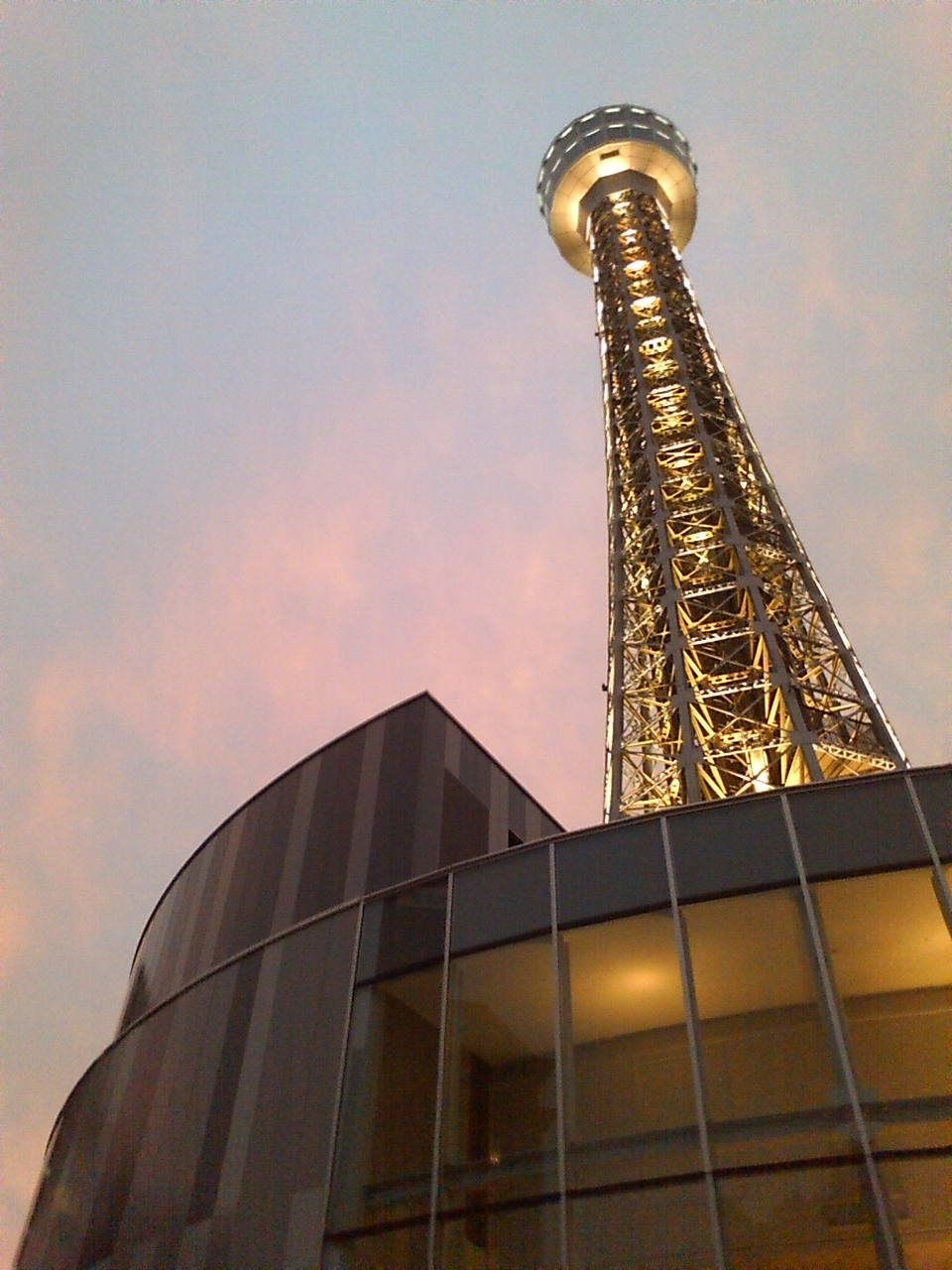
Yokohama Marine Tower

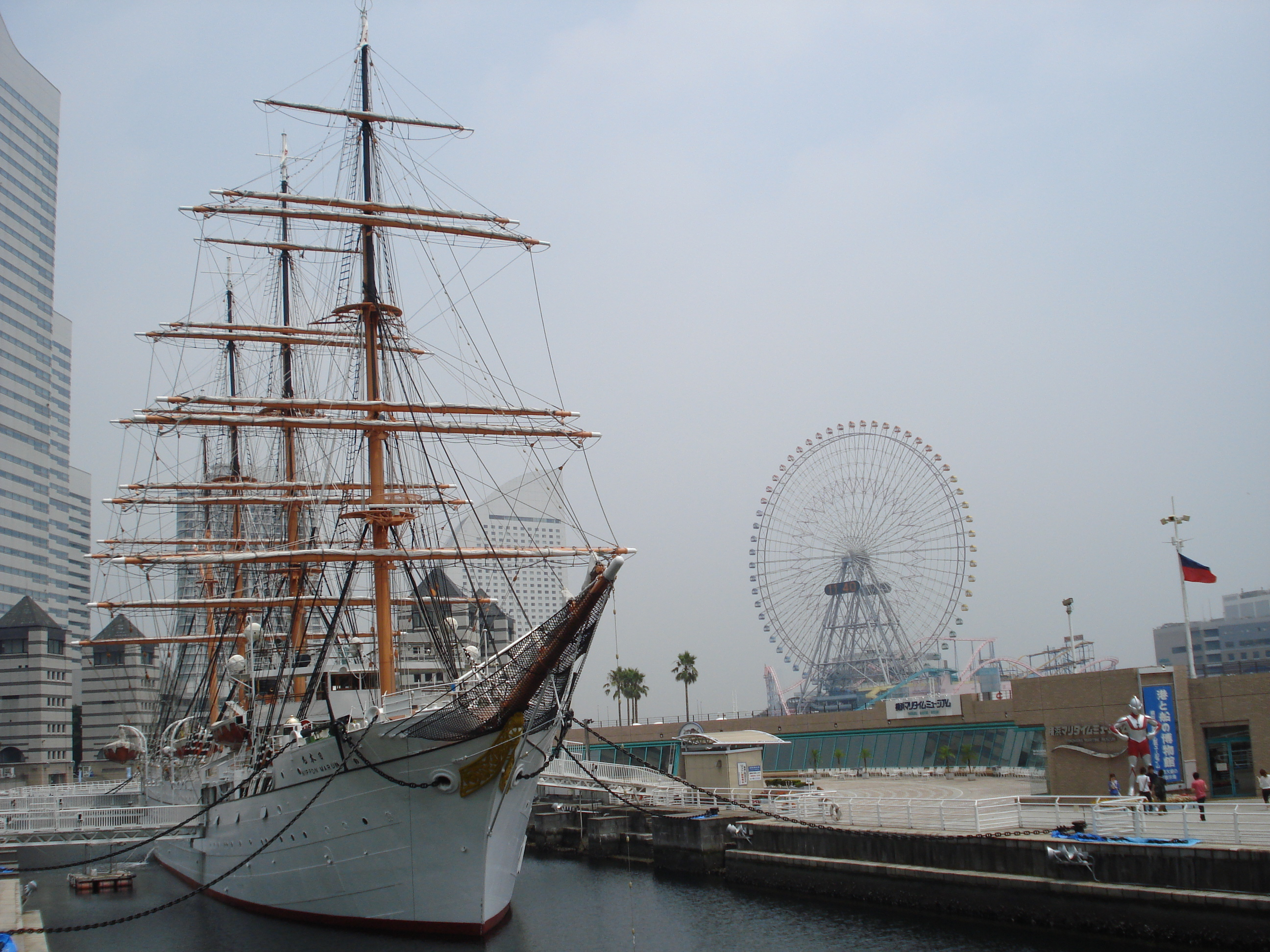
Nippon Maru Memorial Park

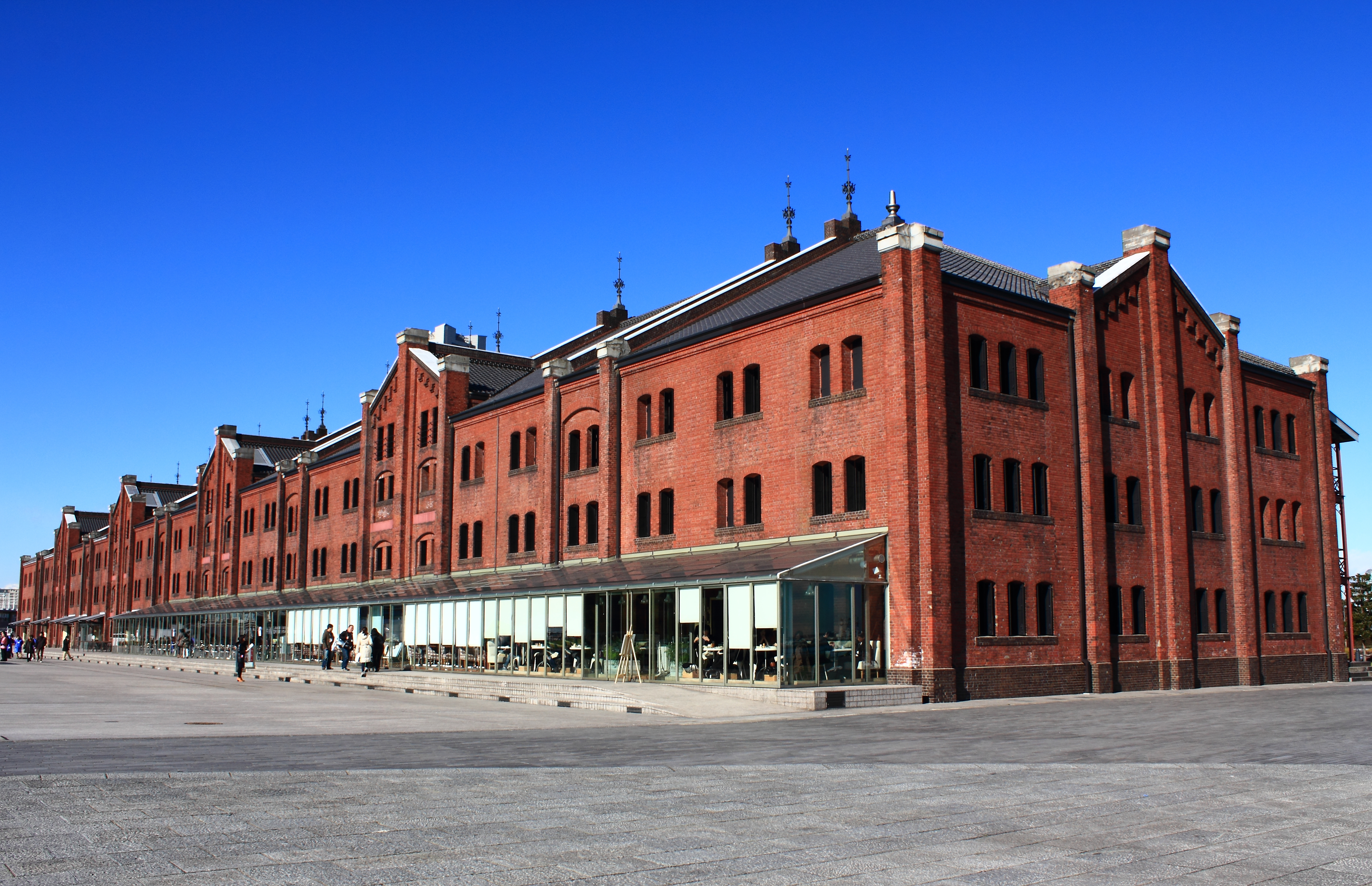
Yokohama Red Brick Warehouse

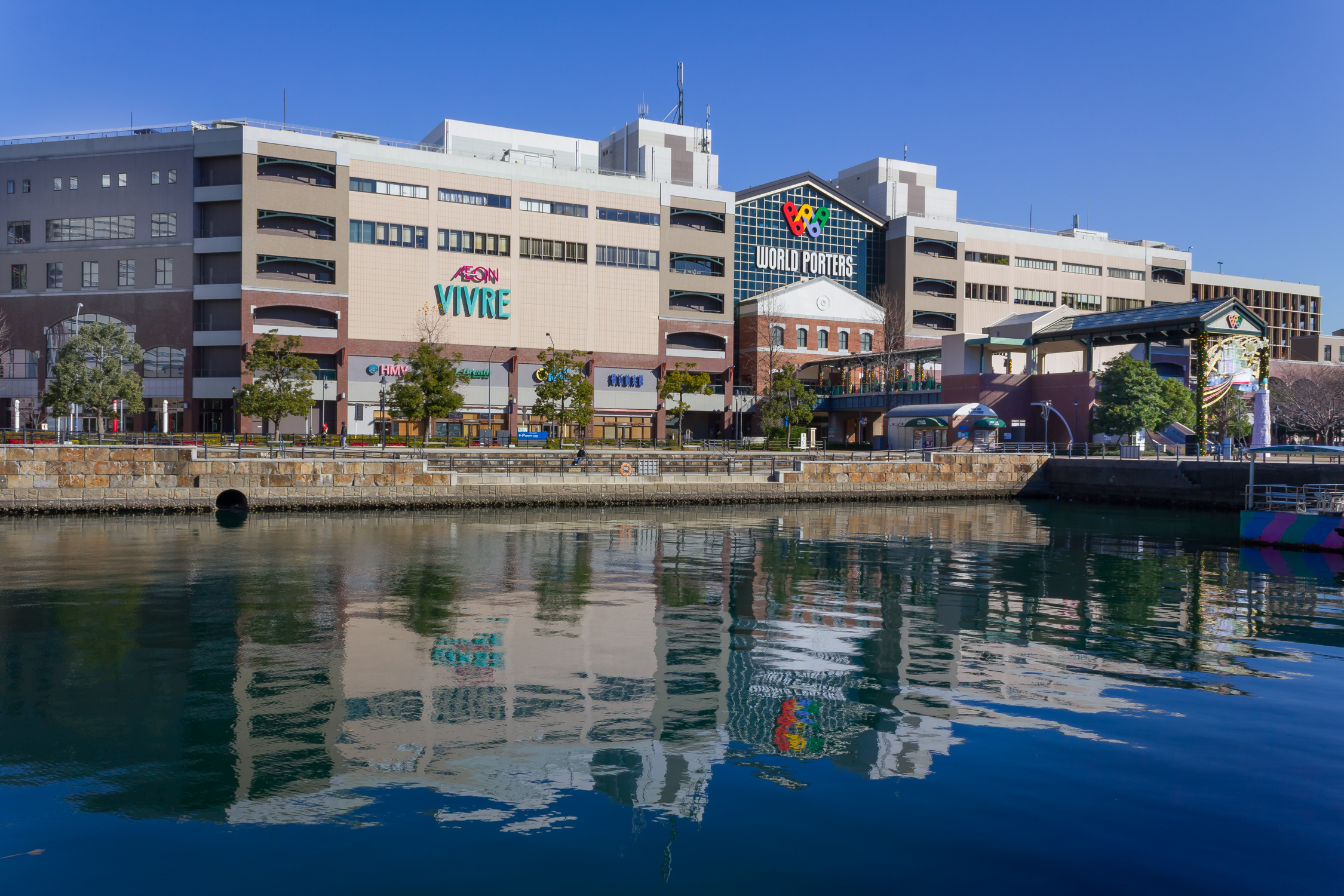
Yokohama World Porters

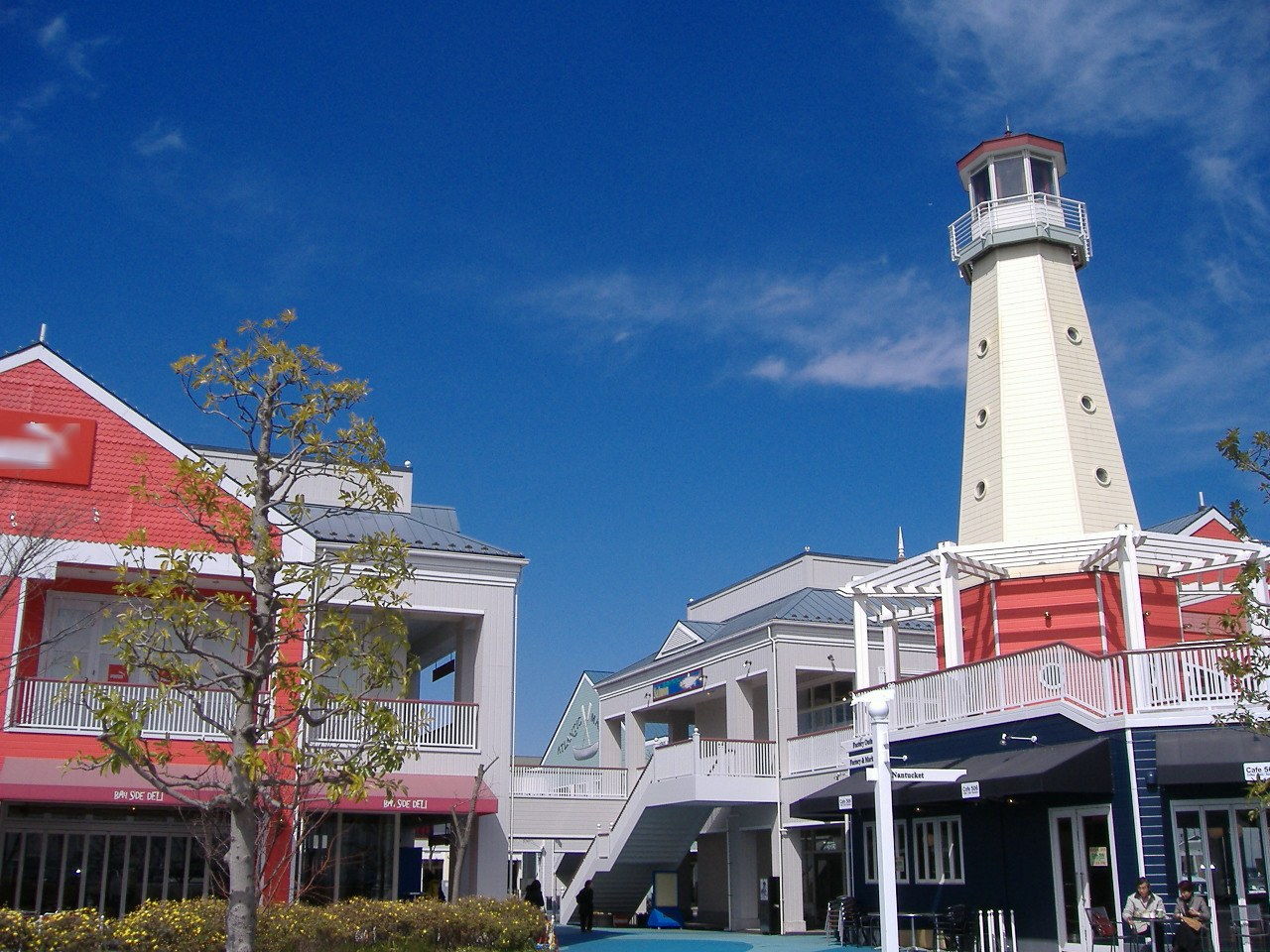
Mitsui Outlet Park Yokohama Bayside

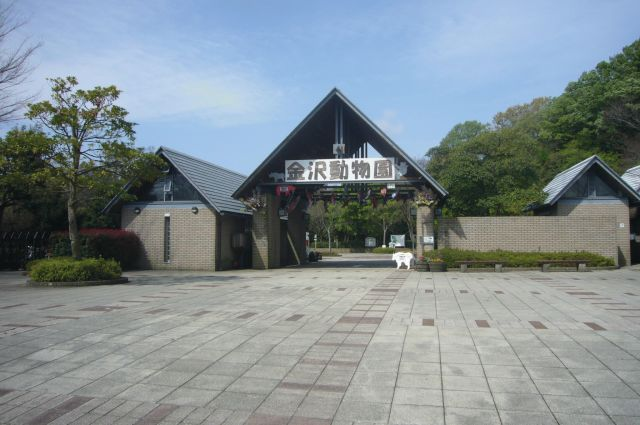
Yokohama Municipal Kanazawa Zoo

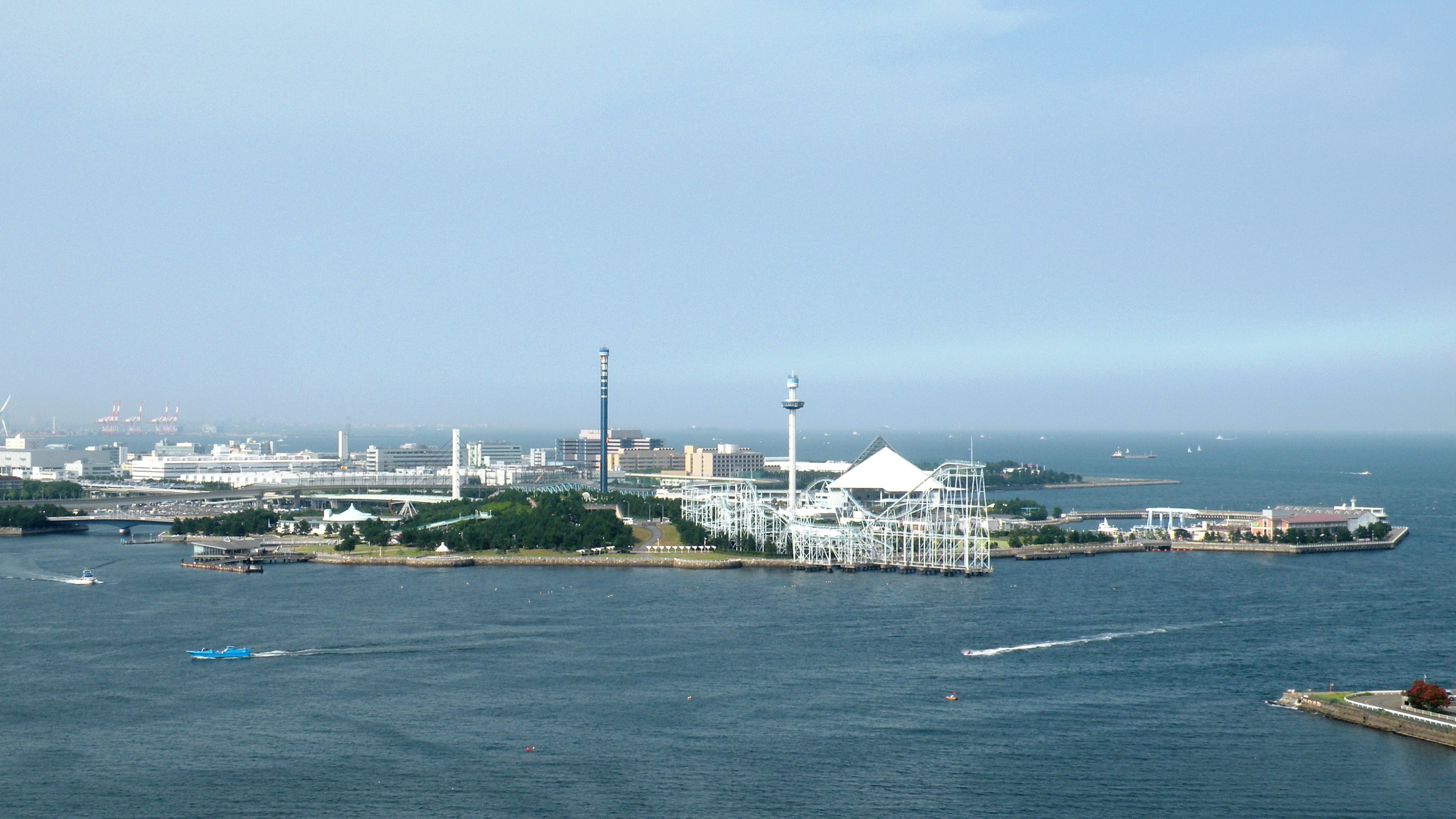
Yokohama Hakkeijima Sea Paradise

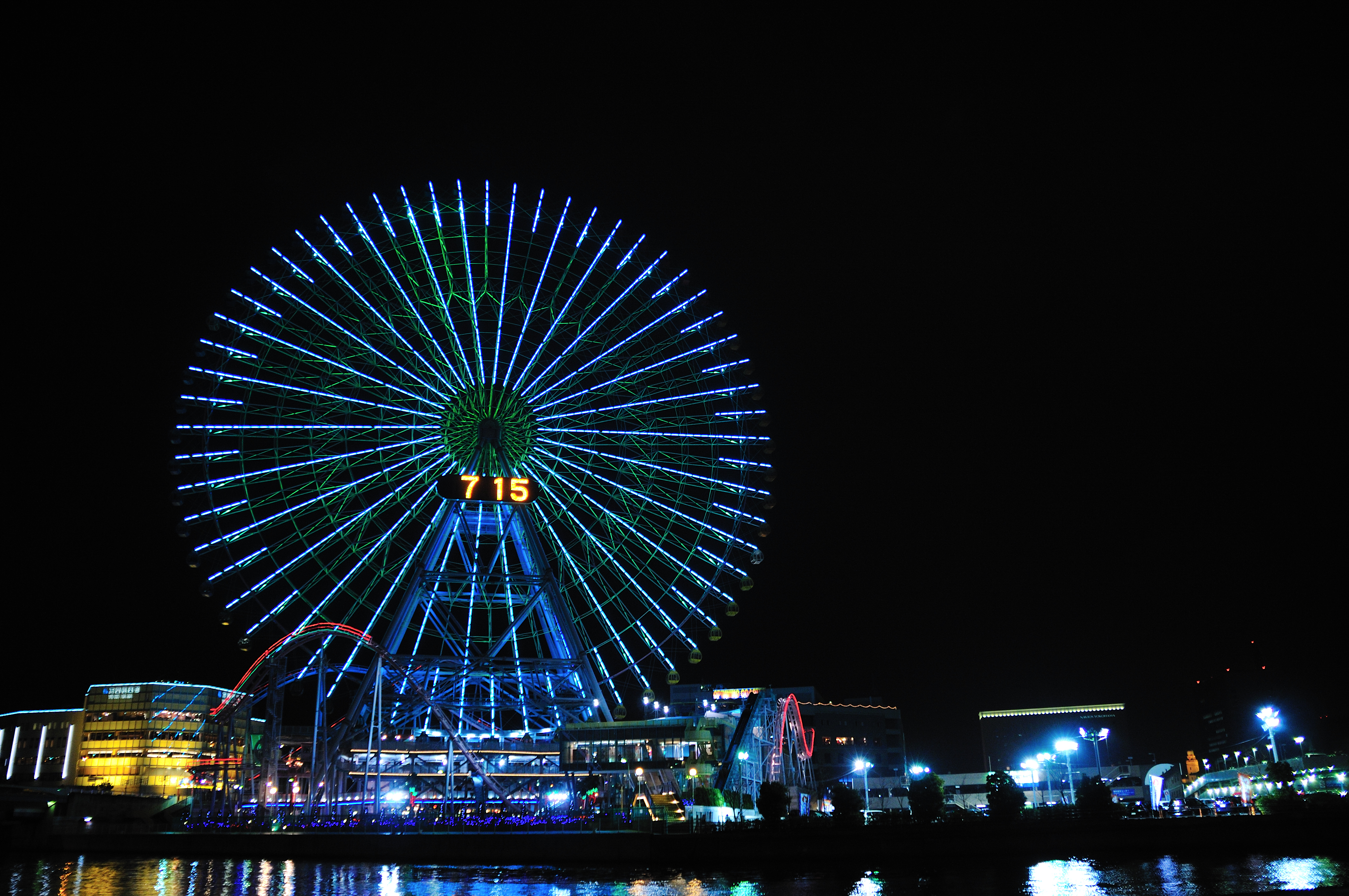
Yokohama Cosmo World

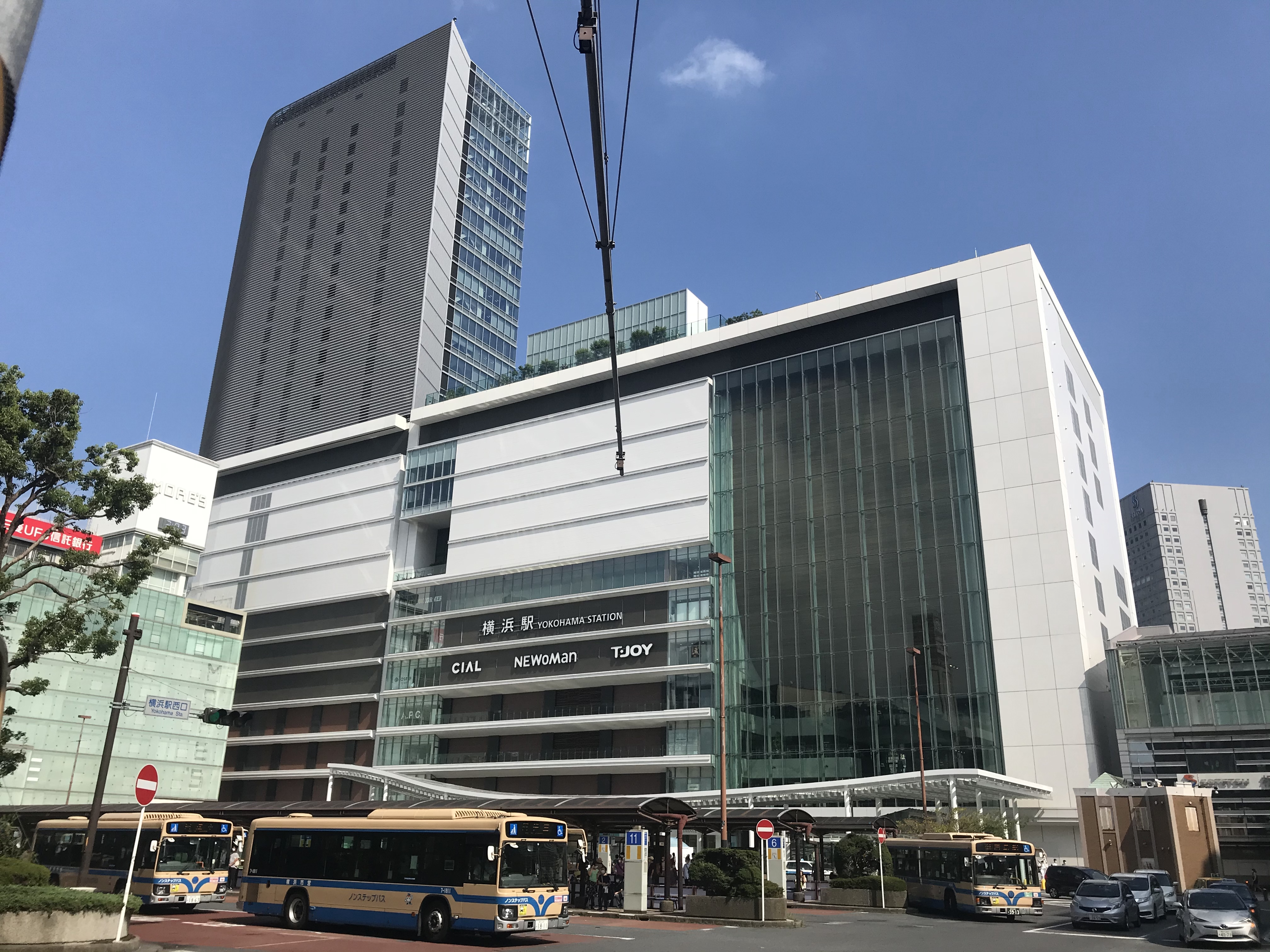
Yokohama Station

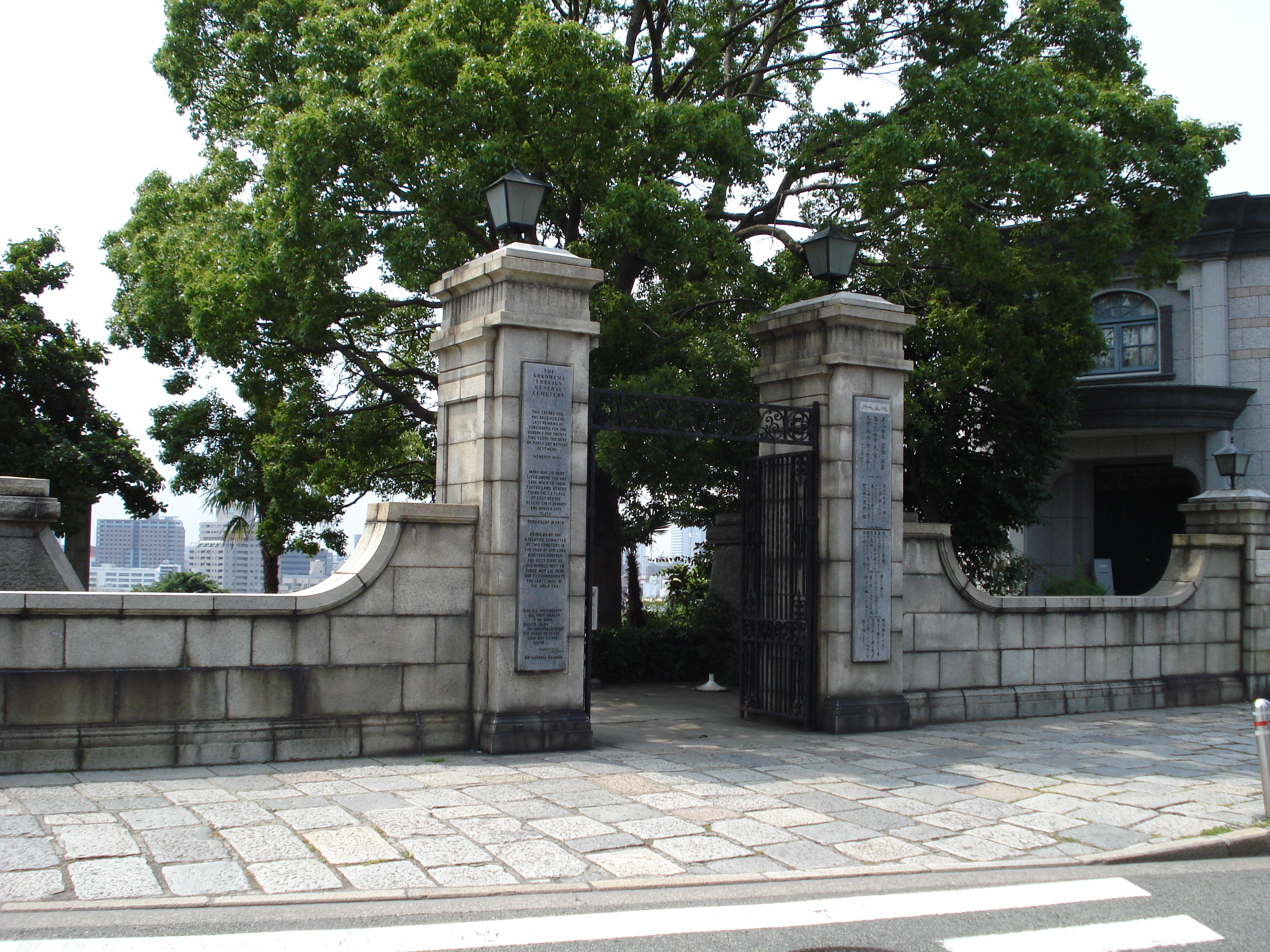
Yokohama Foreign General Cemetery

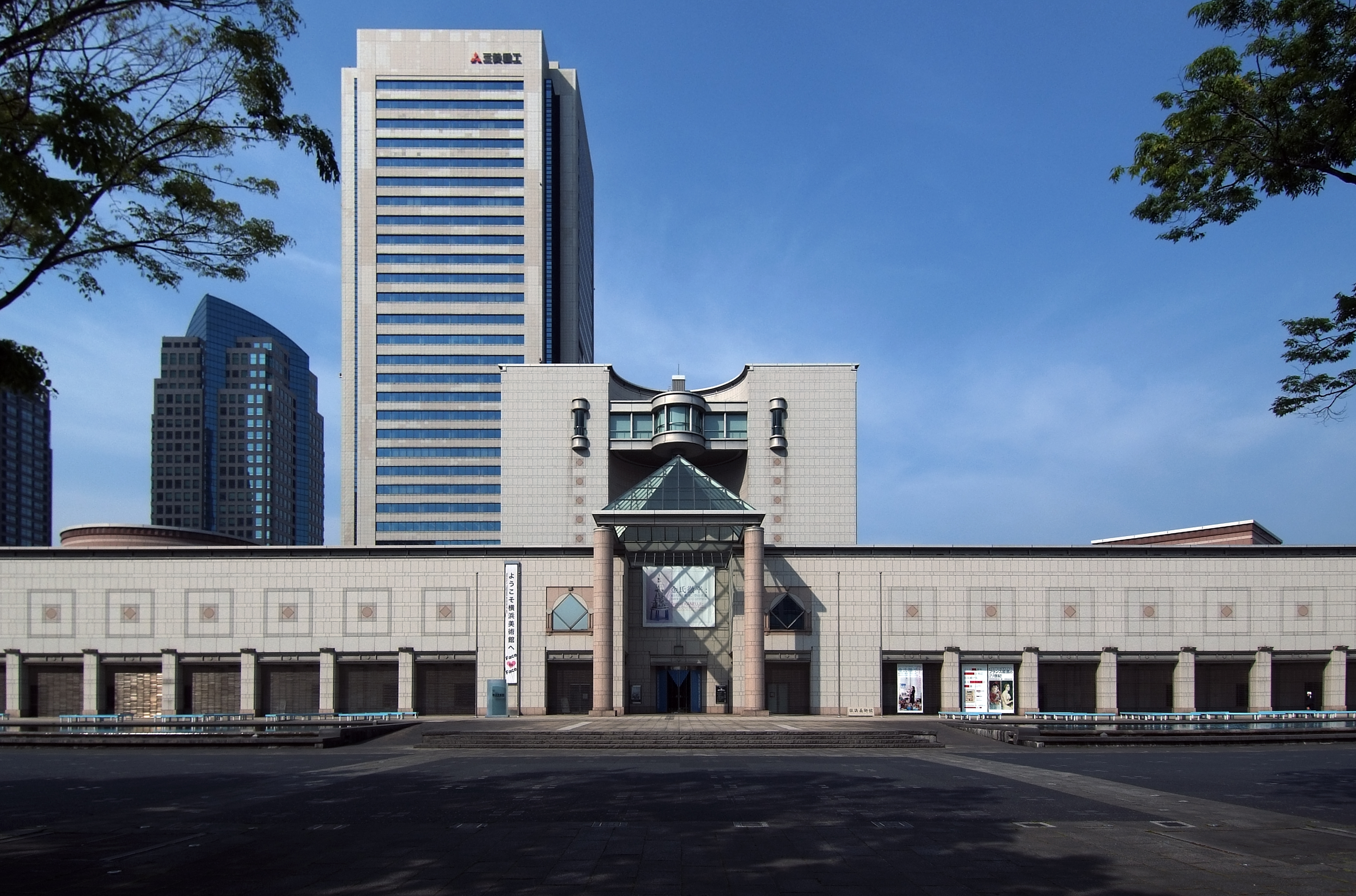
Yokohama Museum of Art

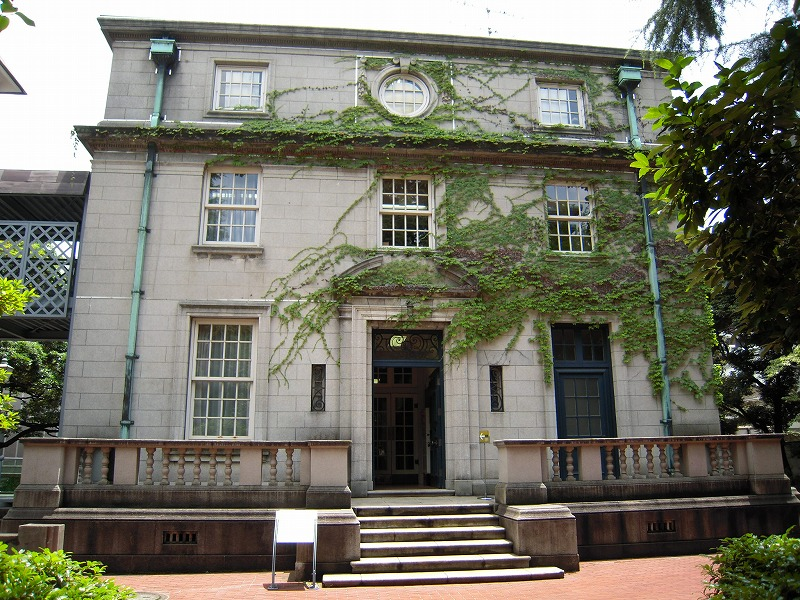
Yokohama Archives of History

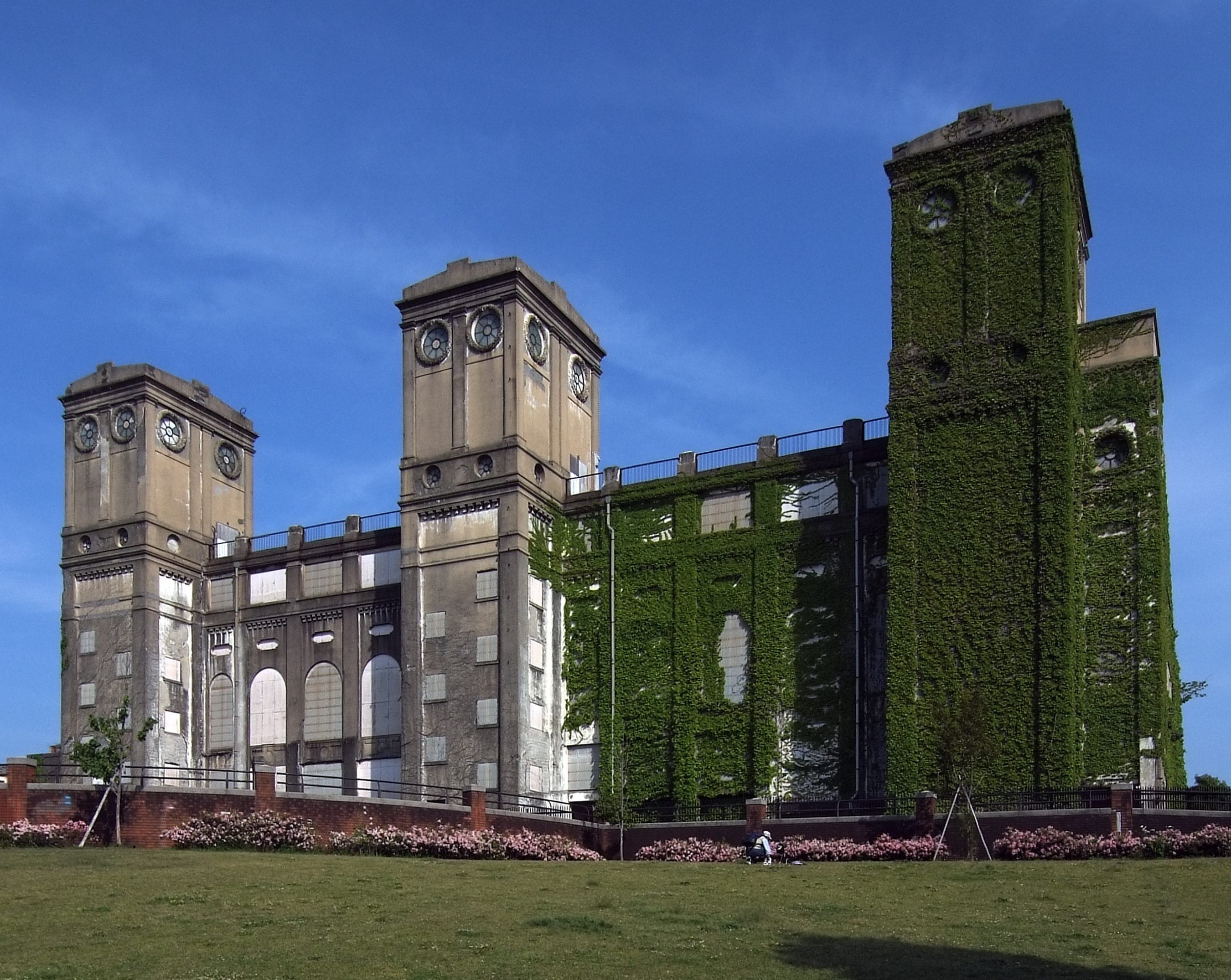
Negishi Park

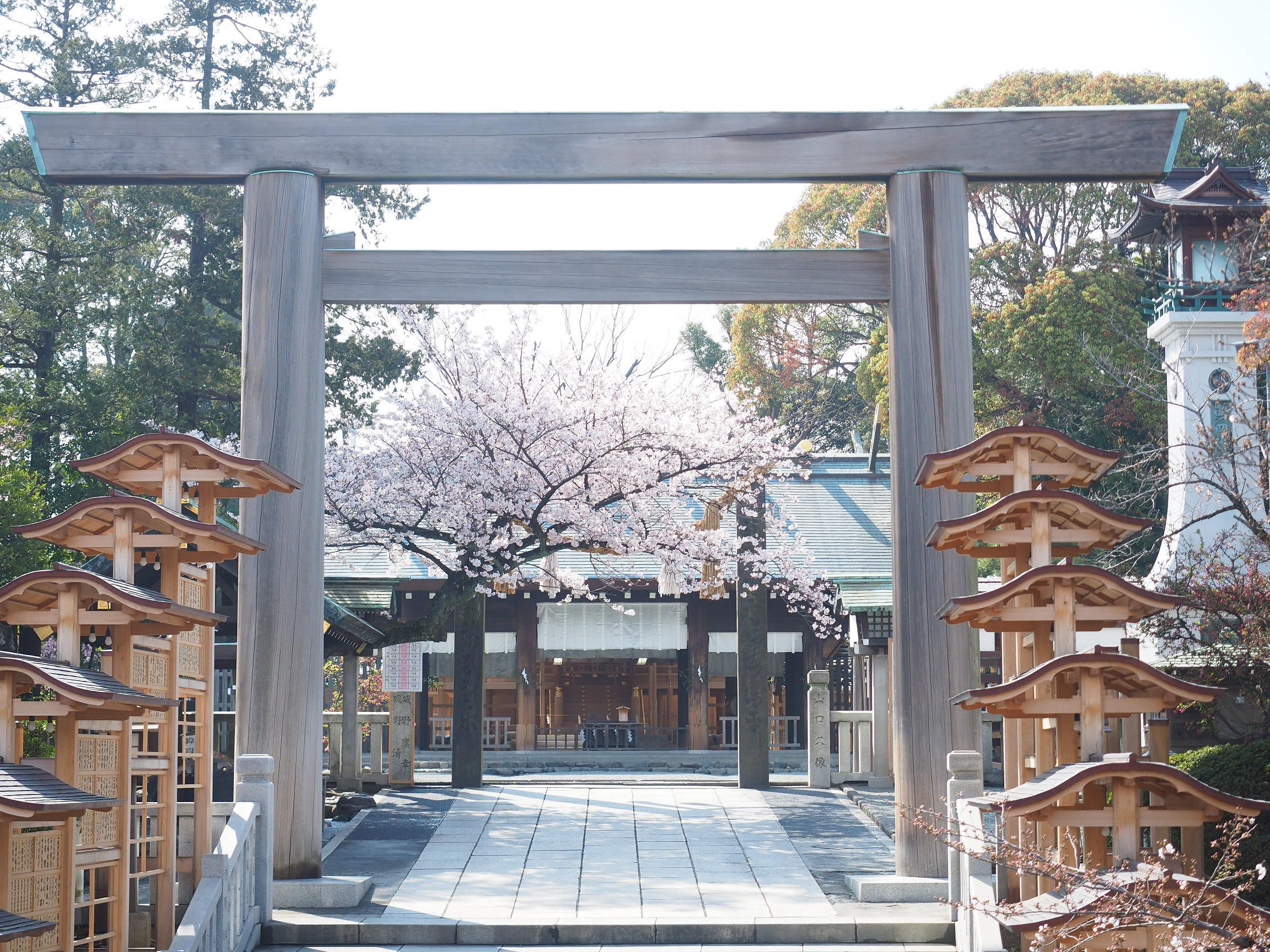
Iseyama Kotai Shrine

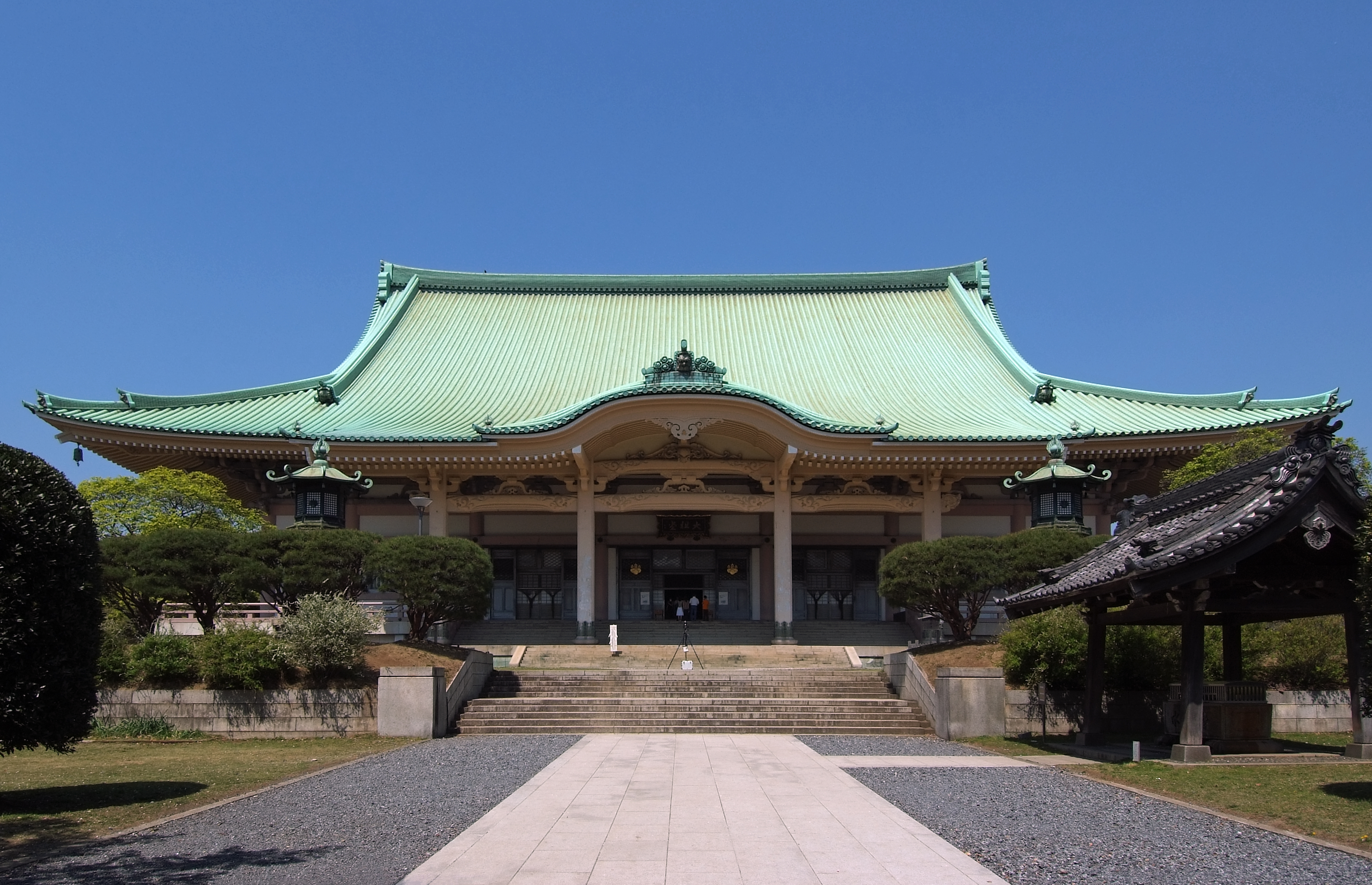
Sōji-ji

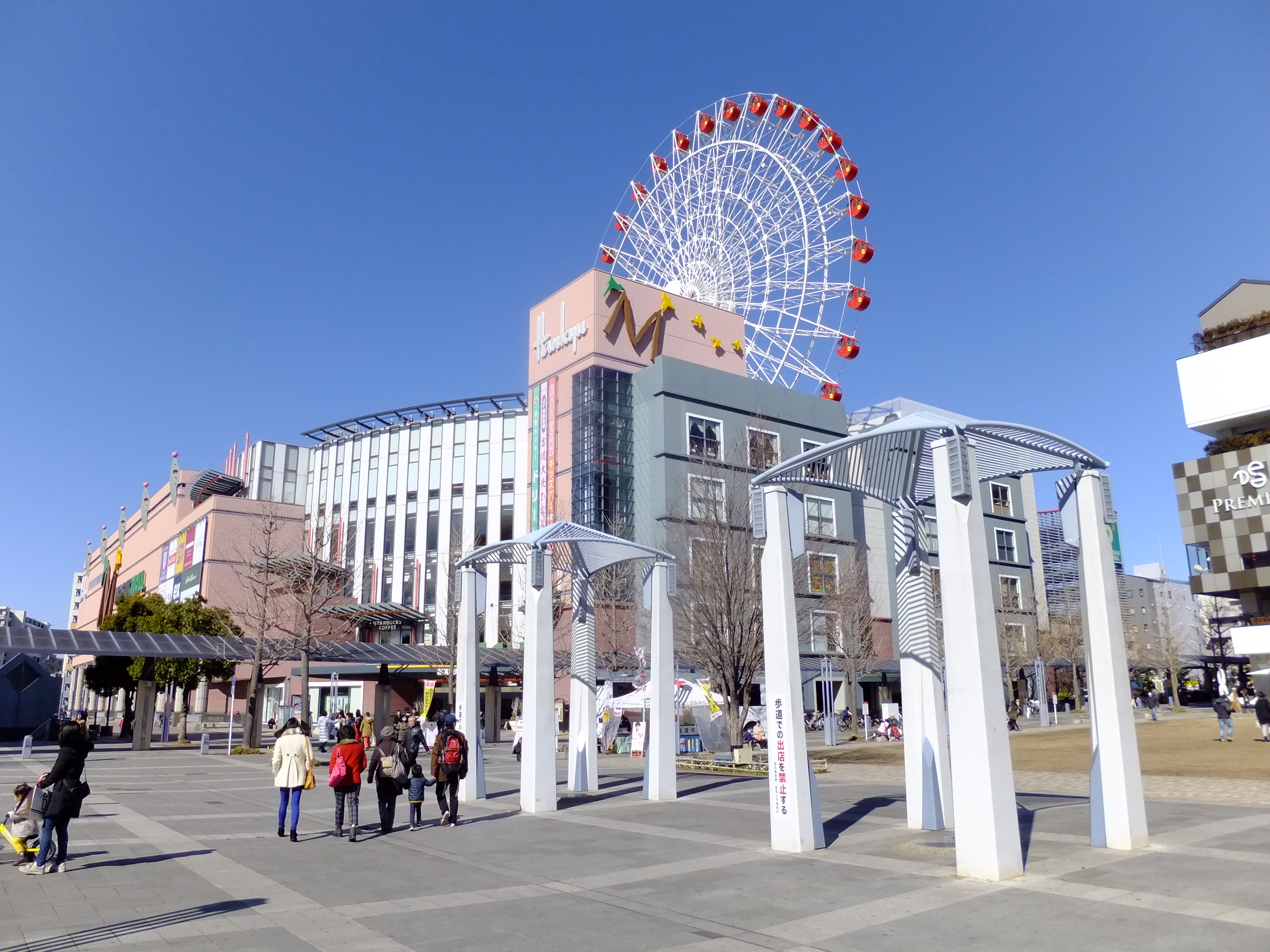
MOSAIC MALL Kōhoku

In 2016, 46,017,157 tourists visited the city, 13.1% of whom were overnight guests.

== Sports ==
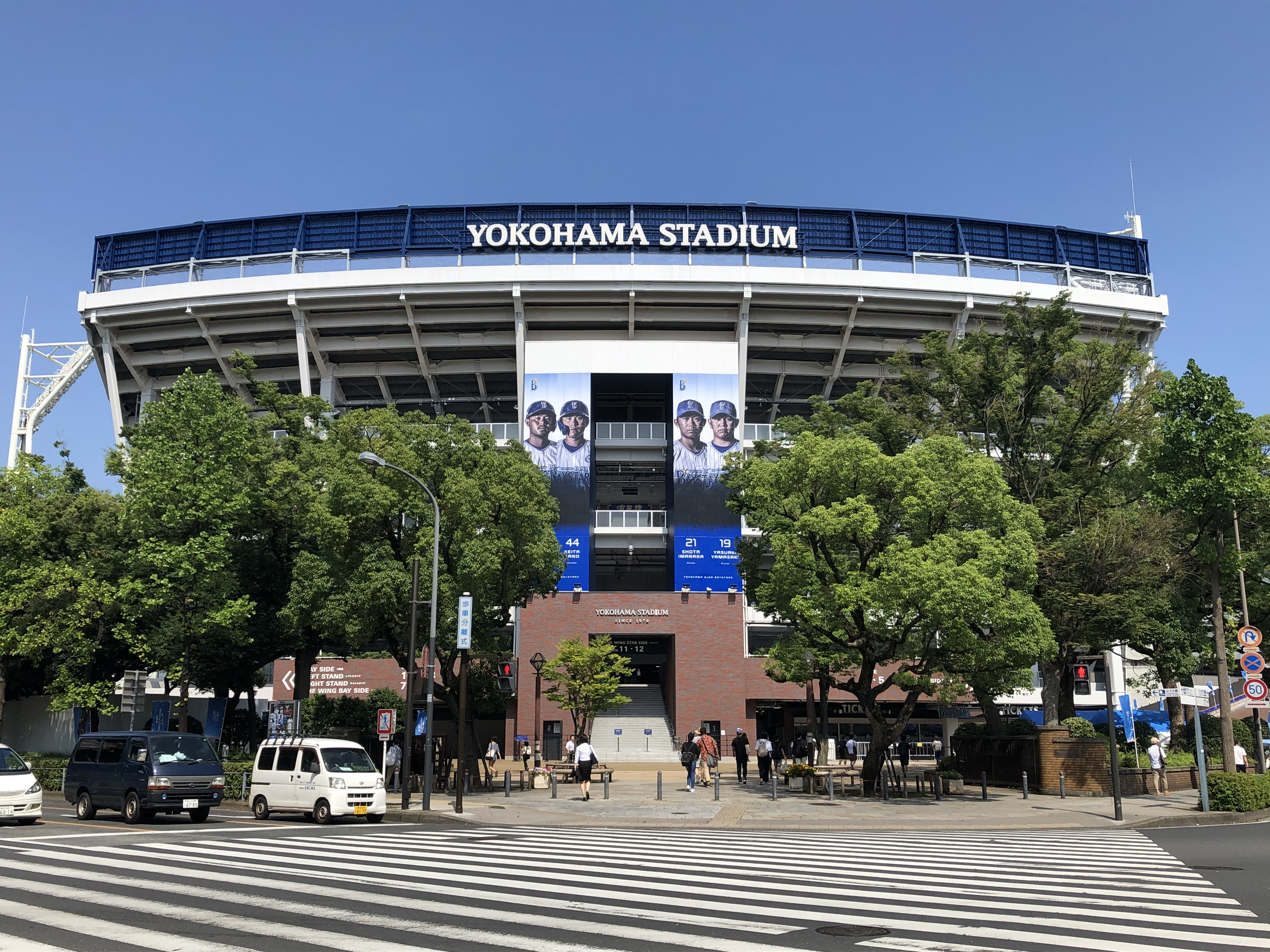
Yokohama Stadium exterior

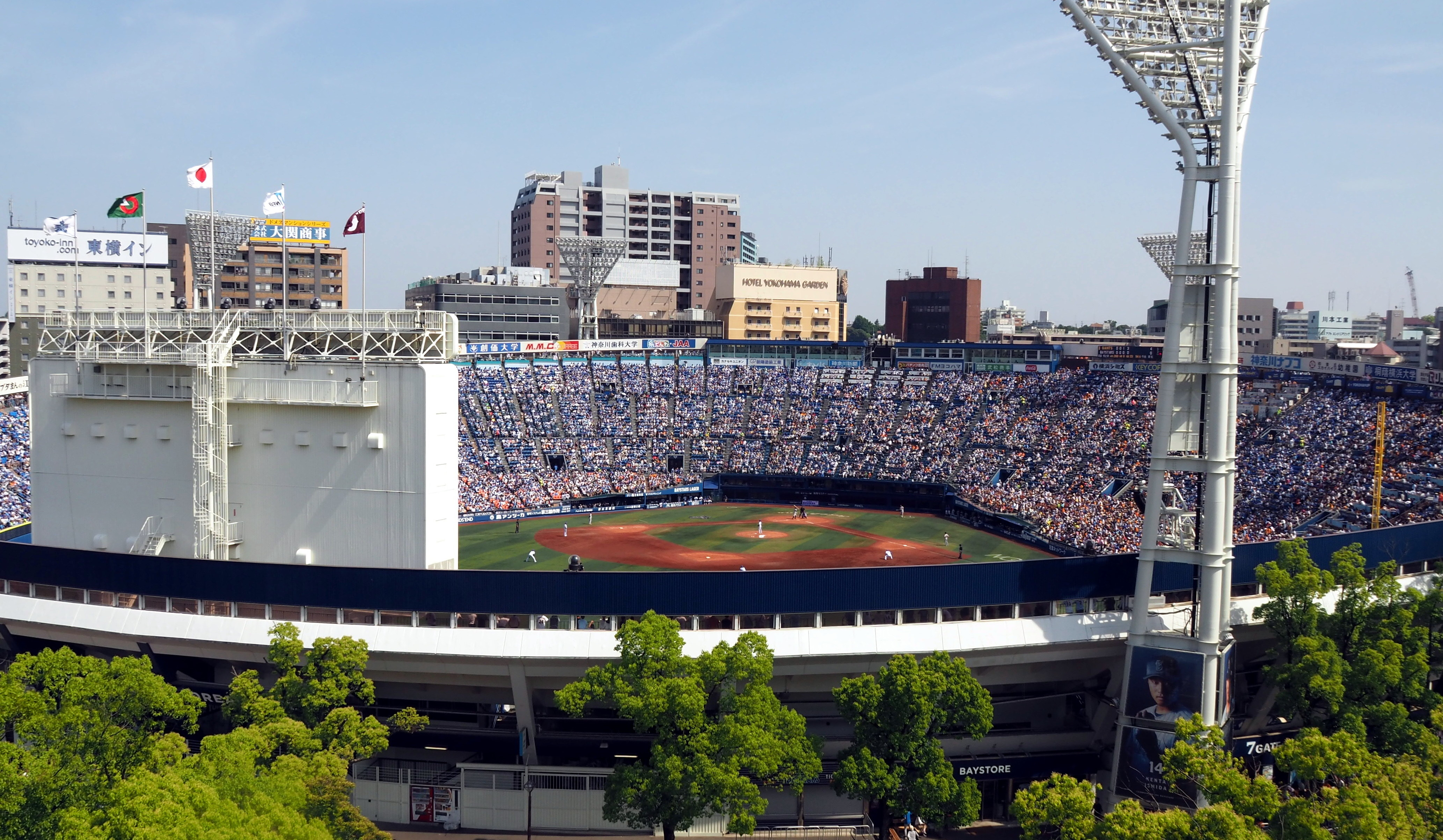
Yokohama Stadium crowd

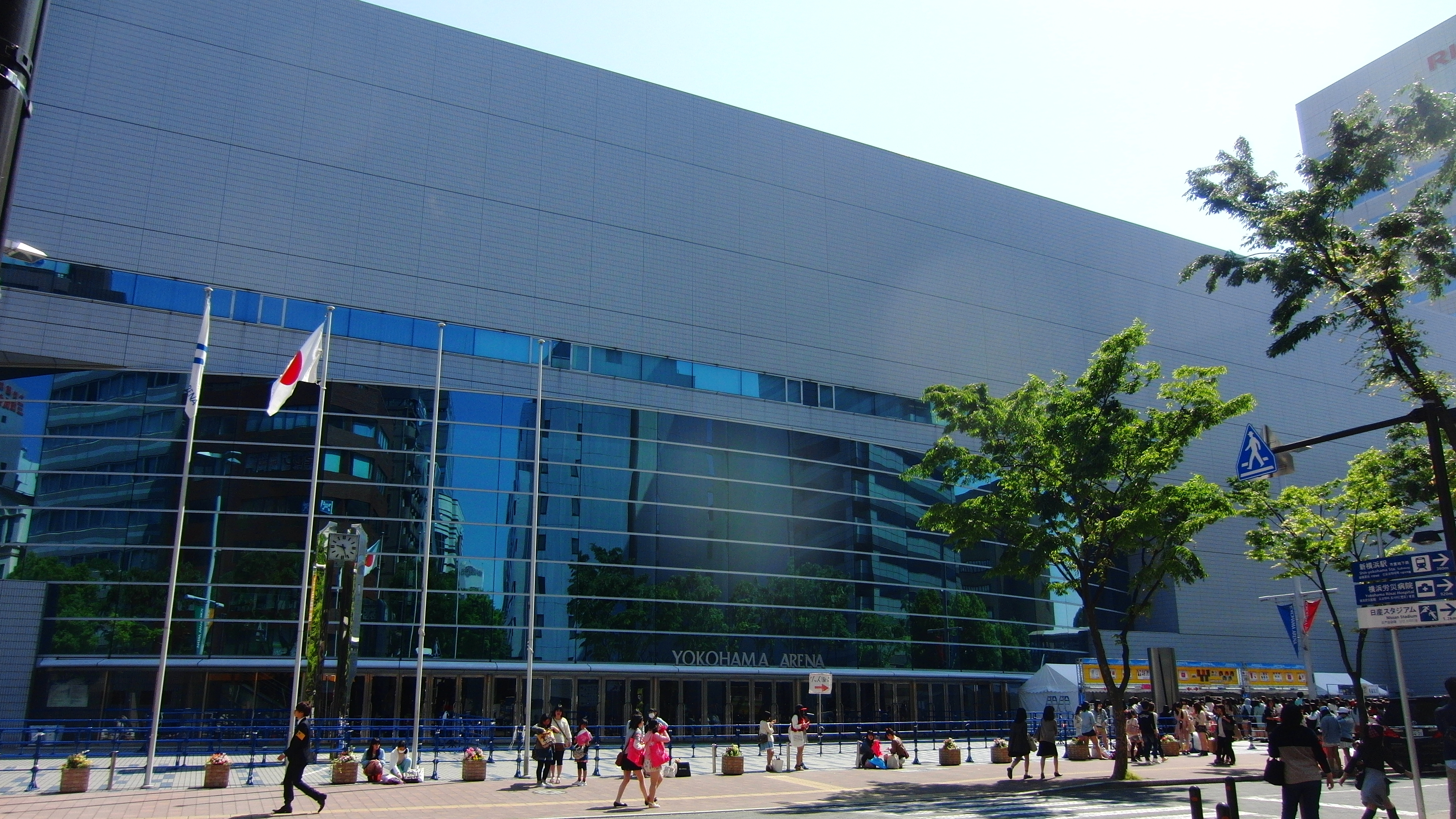
Yokohama Arena exterior

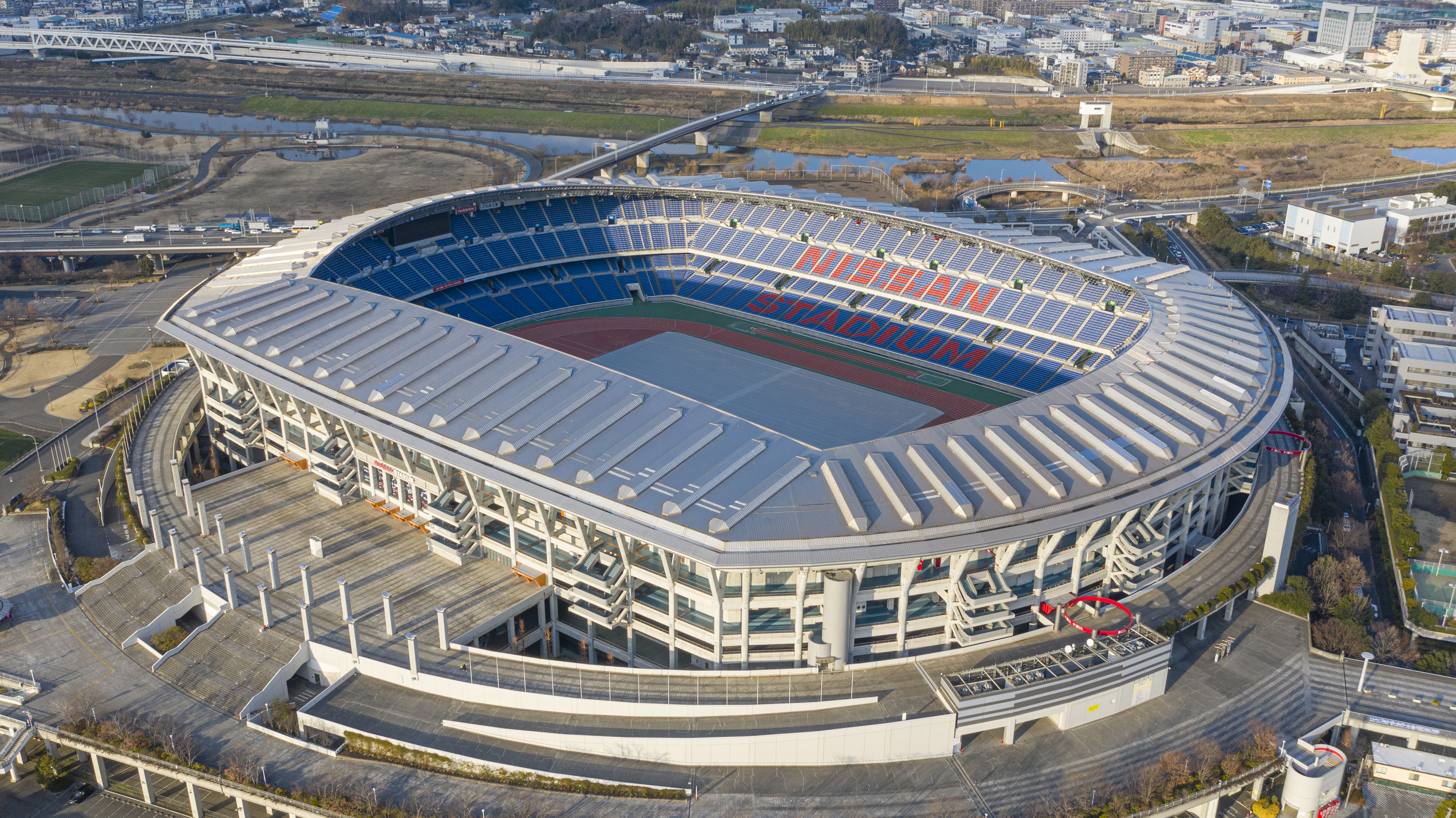
Nissan Stadium exterior

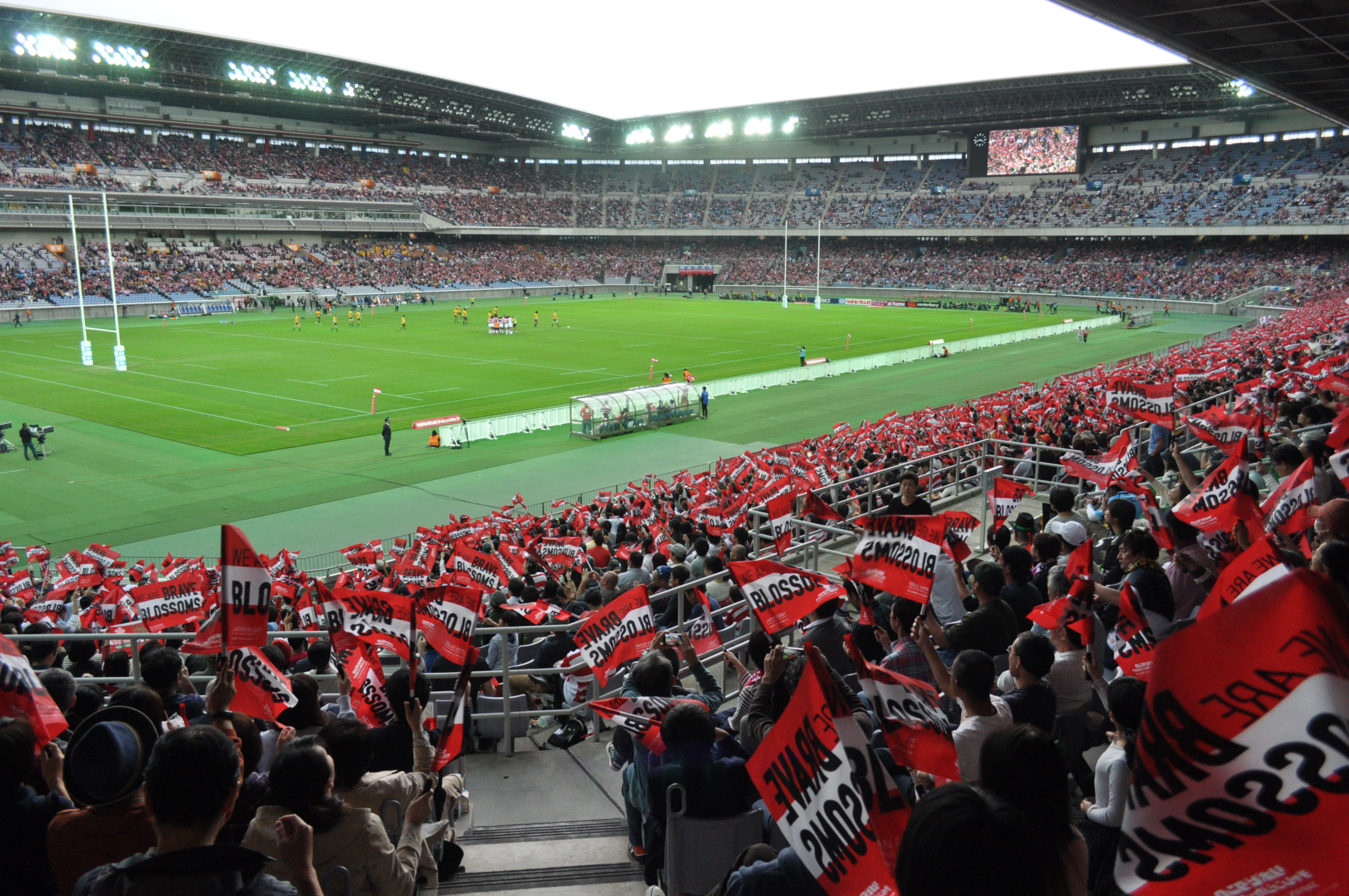
Nissan Stadium crowd
- Baseball: Yokohama DeNA BayStars
- Association football: Yokohama FC (J1 League), Yokohama F. Marinos (J1 League), YSCC Yokohama (Japan Football League), NHK Yokohama FC Seagulls (Nadeshiko League Div. 2)
- Velodrome: Kagetsu-en Velodrome
- Basketball: Yokohama B-Corsairs
- Ice Hockey: Yokohama Grits
- Rugby Union: Yokohama Eagles
- Tennis: Ai Sugiyama
- American football: Yokohama Harbors

== Transport ==
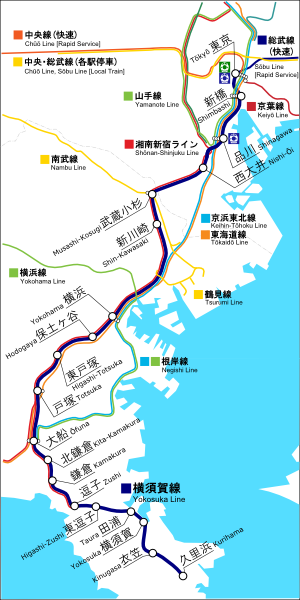
A route map in Yokohama and Tokyo (JR East)

Yokohama is serviced by the Tōkaidō Shinkansen, a high-speed rail line with a stop at Shin-Yokohama Station. Yokohama Station is also a major station, with two million passengers daily. The Yokohama Municipal Subway, Minatomirai Line and Kanazawa Seaside Line provide metro services.

=== Air transport ===
Yokohama does not have an airport, but is served by Tokyo's two main airports Haneda Airport which is 17.4 km away and Narita International Airport which is 77 km away.

=== Maritime transport ===
Yokohama is the world's 31st largest seaport in terms of total cargo volume, at 121,326 freight tons as of 2011, and is ranked 37th in terms of TEUs (Twenty-foot equivalent units).

In 2013, APM Terminals Yokohama facility was recognized as the most productive container terminal in the world averaging 163 crane moves per hour, per ship between the vessel's arrival and departure at the berth.

=== Rail transport ===
==== Railway stations ====
■ East Japan Railway Company (JR East)
■ Tōkaidō Main Line
- – Yokohama – Totsuka –
■ Yokosuka Line
- – Yokohama – Hodogaya – Higashi-Totsuka – Totsuka –
■ Keihin-Tōhoku Line
- – Tsurumi – Shin-Koyasu – Higashi-Kanagawa – Yokohama
■ Negishi Line
- Yokohama – Sakuragichō – Kannai – Ishikawachō – Yamate – Negishi – Isogo – Shin-Sugita – Yōkōdai – Kōnandai – Hongōdai –
■ Yokohama Line
- Higashi-Kanagawa – Ōguchi – Kikuna – Shin-Yokohama – Kozukue – Kamoi – Nakayama – Tōkaichiba – Nagatsuta –
■ Nambu Line
- – Yakō –
■ Tsurumi Line
- Main Line : Tsurumi – Kokudō – Tsurumi-Ono – Bentembashi – Asano – Anzen –
- Umi-Shibaura Branch : Asano – Shin-Shibaura – Umi-Shibaura
■ Central Japan Railway Company (JR Central)
■ Tōkaidō Shinkansen
- – Shin-Yokohama –
■ Keikyu
■ Keikyu Main Line
- – Tsurumi-Ichiba – Keikyū Tsurumi – Kagetsuen-mae – Namamugi – Keikyū Shin-Koyasu – Koyasu – Kanagawa-Shinmachi – Naka-Kido – Kanagawa – Yokohama – Tobe – Hinodechō – Koganechō – Minami-Ōta – Idogaya – Gumyōji – Kami-Ōoka – Byōbugaura – Sugita – Keikyū Tomioka – Nōkendai – Kanazawa-Bunko – Kanazawa-Hakkei –
■ Keikyu Zushi Line
- Kanazawa-Hakkei – Mutsuura –
■ Tokyu Railways
■ Tōyoko Line
- – Hiyoshi – Tsunashima – Ōkurayama – Kikuna – Myōrenji – Hakuraku – Higashi-Hakuraku – Tammachi – Yokohama
■ Meguro Line
- – Hiyoshi
■ Den-en-toshi Line
- – Tama-Plaza – Azamino – Eda – Ichigao – Fujigaoka – Aobadai – Tana – Nagatsuta –
■ Kodomonokuni Line
- Nagatsuta – Onda – Kodomonokuni
■ Sagami Railway
■ Sagami Railway Main Line
- Yokohama – Hiranumabashi – Nishi-Yokohama – Tennōchō – Hoshikawa – Wadamachi – Kamihoshikawa – Nishiya – Tsurugamine – Futamata-gawa – Kibōgaoka – Mitsukyō – Seya –
■ Izumino Line
- Futamata-gawa – Minami-Makigahara – Ryokuentoshi – Yayoidai – Izumino – Izumi-chūō – Yumegaoka
■ Yokohama Minatomirai Railway
■ Minatomirai Line
- Yokohama – Shin-Takashima – Minato Mirai – Bashamichi – Nihon-ōdōri – Motomachi-Chūkagai
■ Yokohama City Transportation Bureau (Yokohama Municipal Subway)
■ Blue Line
- – Shimoiida – Tateba – Nakada – Odoriba – Totsuka – Maioka – Shimonagaya – Kaminagaya – Kōnan-Chūō – Kami-Ōoka – Gumyōji – Maita – Yoshinochō – Bandōbashi – Isezakichōjamachi – Kannai – Sakuragichō – Takashimachō – Yokohama – Mitsuzawa-shimochō – Mitsuzawa-kamichō – Katakurachō – Kishine-kōen – Shin-Yokohama – Kita Shin-Yokohama – Nippa – Nakamachidai – Center Minami – Center Kita – Nakagawa – Azamino
■ Green Line
- Nakayama – Kawawachō – Tsuzuki-Fureai-no-Oka – Center Minami – Center Kita – Kita-Yamata – Higashi-Yamata – Takata – Hiyoshi-Honchō – Hiyoshi
■ Yokohama New Transit
■ Kanazawa Seaside Line
- Shin-Sugita – Nambu-Shijō – Torihama – Namiki-Kita – Namiki-Chūō – Sachiura – Sangyō-Shinkō-Center – Fukuura – Shidai-Igakubu – Hakkeijima – Uminokōen-Shibaguchi – Uminokōen-Minamiguchi – Nojimakōen – Kanazawa-Hakkei

== Education ==
Public elementary and middle schools are operated by the city of Yokohama. There are nine public high schools which are operated by the Yokohama City Board of Education, and a number of public high schools which are operated by the Kanagawa Prefectural Board of Education. Yokohama National University is a leading university.

- 46,388 children attend the 260 kindergartens.
- Almost 386,000 students are taught in 351 primary schools.
- There are 16 universities including Yokohama National University. The number of students is around 83,000.
- 19 public libraries had 9.5 million loans in 2016.

== In popular culture ==
- Yokohama Kaidashi Kikou is a manga series by Hitoshi Ashinano, set in the outskirts of Yokohama in a post-apocalyptic future where most of the world, including much of Yokohama, has been submerged by the oceans.
- Phileas Fogg makes a stop in Yokohama before moving on to San Francisco in Jules Verne's book, Around the World in Eighty Days.
- Yukio Mishima's novel The Sailor Who Fell from Grace with the Sea is set mainly in Yokohama. Mishima describes the city's port and its houses, and the Western influences that shaped them.
- From Up on Poppy Hill is a 2011 Studio Ghibli animated drama film directed by Gorō Miyazaki set in the Yamate district of Yokohama. The film is based on the serialized Japanese comic book of the same name.
- The main setting of James Clavell's book Gai-Jin is in historical Yokohama.
- Vermilion City in the Kanto region from the Pokémon franchise is based on Yokohama. During the closing ceremony of the 2022 Pokémon World Championships in London, Yokohama was announced as the 2023 host city by using footage of Vermilion City from Pokémon Red, Blue, and Yellow. The 2023 World Championships were held at the Pacifico Yokohama convention and exhibition center between August 11–13, 2023. In the video game division, the host country won the finals of all three age divisions.
- One of the Pretty Cure crossover movies takes place in Yokohama. In the fourth movie of the series, Pretty Cure All Stars New Stage: Friends of the Future, the Pretty Cure appear standing on top of the Cosmo Clock 21 in Minato Mirai.
- The main setting of the Japanese visual novel series Muv-Luv, first a school and then, in an alternate history, a military base is built in Yokohama with the objective of carrying out the Alternative IV Plan meant to save humanity.
- In Command & Conquer: Red Alert 3, Yokohama is under siege by the Soviet Union and Allied Nations to stop the Empire of The Rising Sun. The player must defend Yokohama and then lead a counterattack as the Empire.
- The manga Bungo Stray Dogs is set in Yokohama.
- The 2006 animated film Detective Conan: The Private Eyes' Requiem takes place in Yokohama.
- The Japanese mixed-media project, Hamatora takes place in Yokohama.
- The final battles in Godzilla vs. Mothra (1992) and Godzilla, Mothra and King Ghidorah: Giant Monsters All-Out Attack (2001) take place in Yokohama.
- In My Hero Academia, Yokohama is the location of the Nomu Warehouse where they created artificial Humans (a.k.a. Nomus).
- Sumaru City in the Persona 2 duology is based on Yokohama.
- Miyabi City in The Caligula Effect is based on Yokohama, including depictions of landmarks such as an unfinished Landmark Tower and Yokohama Hakkeijima Sea Paradise (referred to in game as Sea Paraiso).
- The video game Yakuza: Like a Dragon is set in Isezaki Ijincho, a fictional district in Yokohama based on Isezakichō.
- Yokohama is also represented in the multimedia project by King Records, Hypnosis Mic: Division Rap Battle.
- Yokohama is the main setting of Japanese manga and anime series Komi Can't Communicate. Multiple city landmarks are featured in the manga, most notably in the more recently released chapters.
- Yokohama is the setting of the anime After the Rain as well as manga series with the same title by Jun Mayuzuki.
- Akira Kurosawa's 1963 film High and Low was filmed and set in Yokohama.
- The later light novels and equivalent second season of the Rascal Does Not Dream anime takes place at the Kanazawa-Hakkei campus of Yokohama City University as well as the Minatomirai waterfront.
- In Bocchi the Rock!, the main character lives near Kanazawa-hakkei Station.
- In April 2022, The Yokohama Convention & Visitors Bureau announced the launch of a new interactive website to aid in the tourism and MICE elements of the city.
- The manga You and I Are Polar Opposites takes place mostly in Yokohama, more specifically in Aoba ward.

== International relations ==
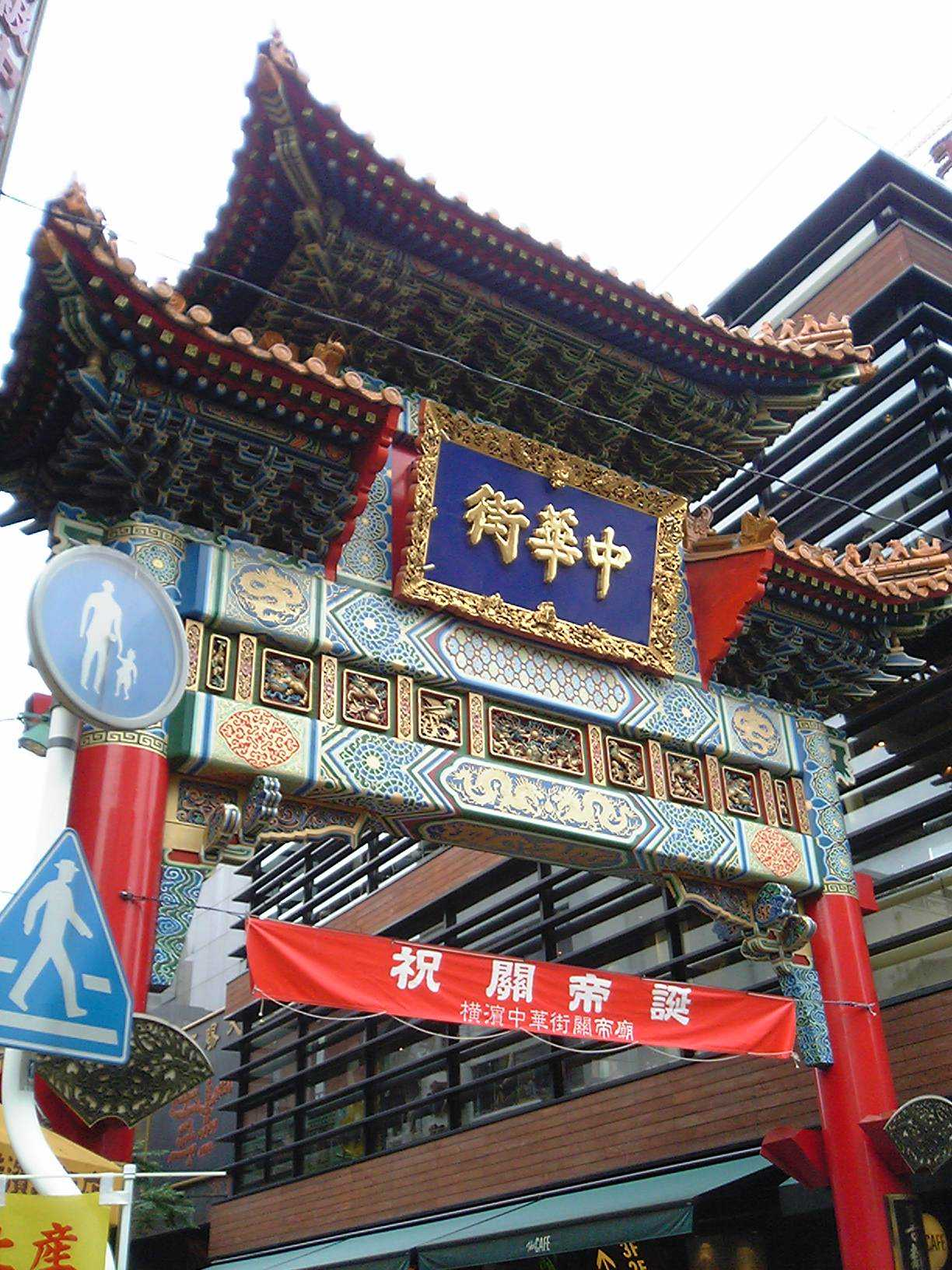
Yokohama Chinatown

=== Twin towns – sister cities ===
Yokohama is twinned with:

- Constanța, Constanța County, Romania, since October 1977
- Lyon, Auvergne-Rhône-Alpes, France, since April 1959
- Manila, Philippines, since July 1965
- Mumbai, Maharashtra, India, since June 1965
- Odesa, Odesa Oblast, Ukraine, since July 1965
- San Diego, CA, United States, since October 1957
- San Francisco, CA, United States, since March 2022
- Shanghai, China, since November 1973
- Vancouver, BC, Canada, since July 1965

=== Partner cities ===
- Abidjan, Ivory Coast
- Adelaide, South Australia, Australia
- Balikpapan, Indonesia, since August 2025
- Beijing, China, since May 2006
- Brisbane, Queensland, Australia, since June 2008
- Busan, South Korea, since June 2006
- Da Nang, Vietnam, since January 2024
- Frankfurt, Hesse, Germany, since September 2011
- Hanoi, Vietnam, since November 2007
- Ho Chi Minh City, Vietnam, since October 2007
- Hue, Vietnam, since March 2024
- Incheon, South Korea, since December 2009
- Melbourne, Victoria, Australia
- Philadelphia, Pennsylvania, United States
- Seberang Perai, Penang, Malaysia, since August 2016
- Taipei, Taiwan, since May 2006
- Tel Aviv, Israel, since July 2012
- Tianjin, China, since May 2008

=== Sister ports ===
- Port of Barcelona, Spain, since November 1989
- (China) Port of Dalian, friendship port treaty, since September 1990
- Port of Hamburg, Germany, since October 1992
- Port of Melbourne, Australia, since May 1986
- Port of Oakland, United States, since May 1980
- Port of Vancouver, Canada, since May 1981
- (China) Port of Shanghai, friendship port treaty, since October 1983

== Notable people ==
- Lily Abegg, journalist
- Jo Asakura, member of Japanese boy group &Team
- The Brahman Brothers, professional wrestlers
- Annie Florence Brown, community leader
- May J., TV host
- Toru Furuya, singer and voice actor
- Shigetoshi Hasebe, football manager and former player
- Tamon Honda, professional wrestler
- Joe Higuchi, professional wrestler
- Antonio Inoki, professional wrestler and politician
- Naoya Inoue, boxer
- Yuma Kagiyama, figure skater
- Shinobu Kandori, politician and professional wrestler
- Crystal Kay, singer
- Hana Kimura, professional wrestler
- Kyoko Kimura, professional wrestler
- Masahiko Kondō, singer and racing driver
- Miki Koyama, racing driver
- Takehito Koyasu, singer and voice actor
- Ryuji Kumita, racing driver and CEO of B-Max Racing
- Keisuke Kunimoto, racing driver
- Yuji Kunimoto, racing driver
- Natsumi Maki, known by ring name Natsupoi, professional wrestler
- Hiro Matsuda, professional wrestler
- Yūta Mochizuki, actor
- Soichi Noguchi, astronaut
- Akinori Ogata, racing driver
- Radwimps, alternative rock band
- Takuro Shinohara, racing driver
- Minoru Suzuki, professional wrestler
- Kuniaki Takahashi, drifting driver
- Yasuto Wakizaka, footballer
- Yuta Watanabe, NBA player for the Toronto Raptors
- Miki Yamane, footballer
- Yusuke Tomibayashi, racing driver
