= Shidai-Igakubu Station =

Railway station in Yokohama, Japan

Coordinates: 35.3442°N 139.6500°E

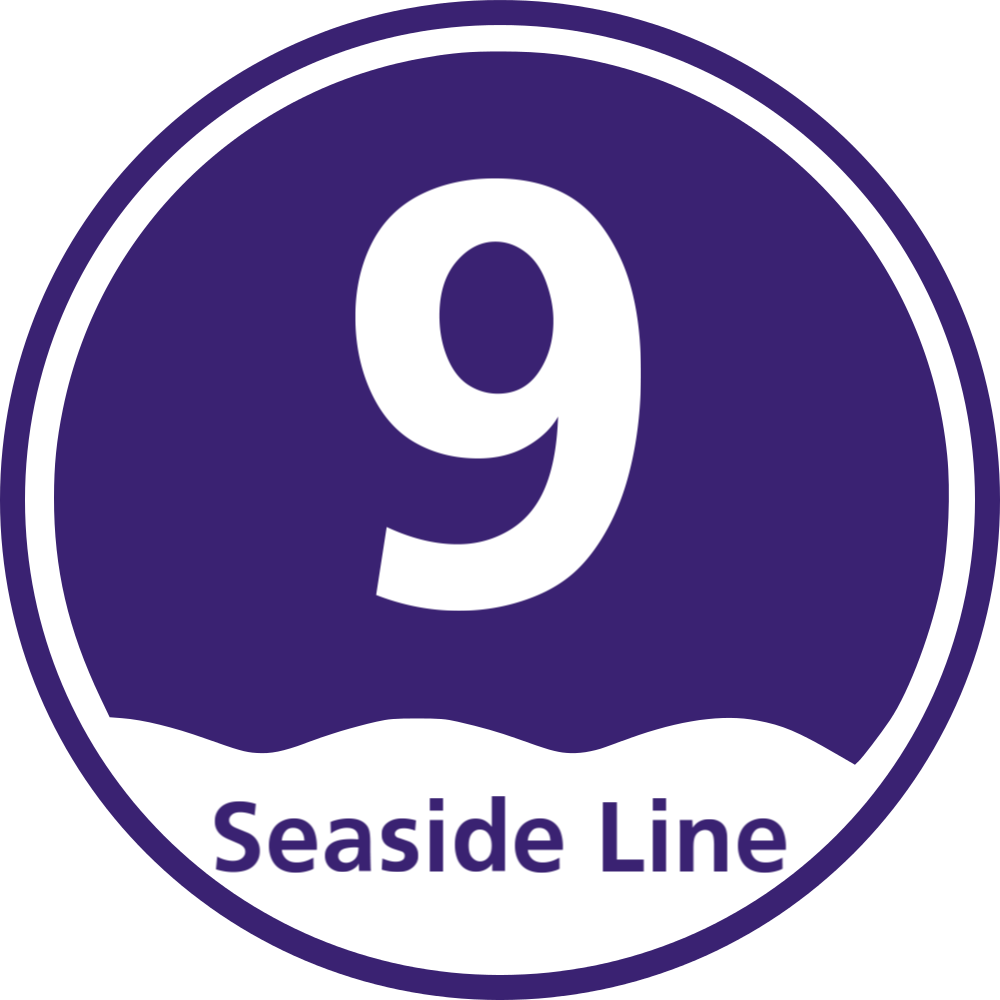

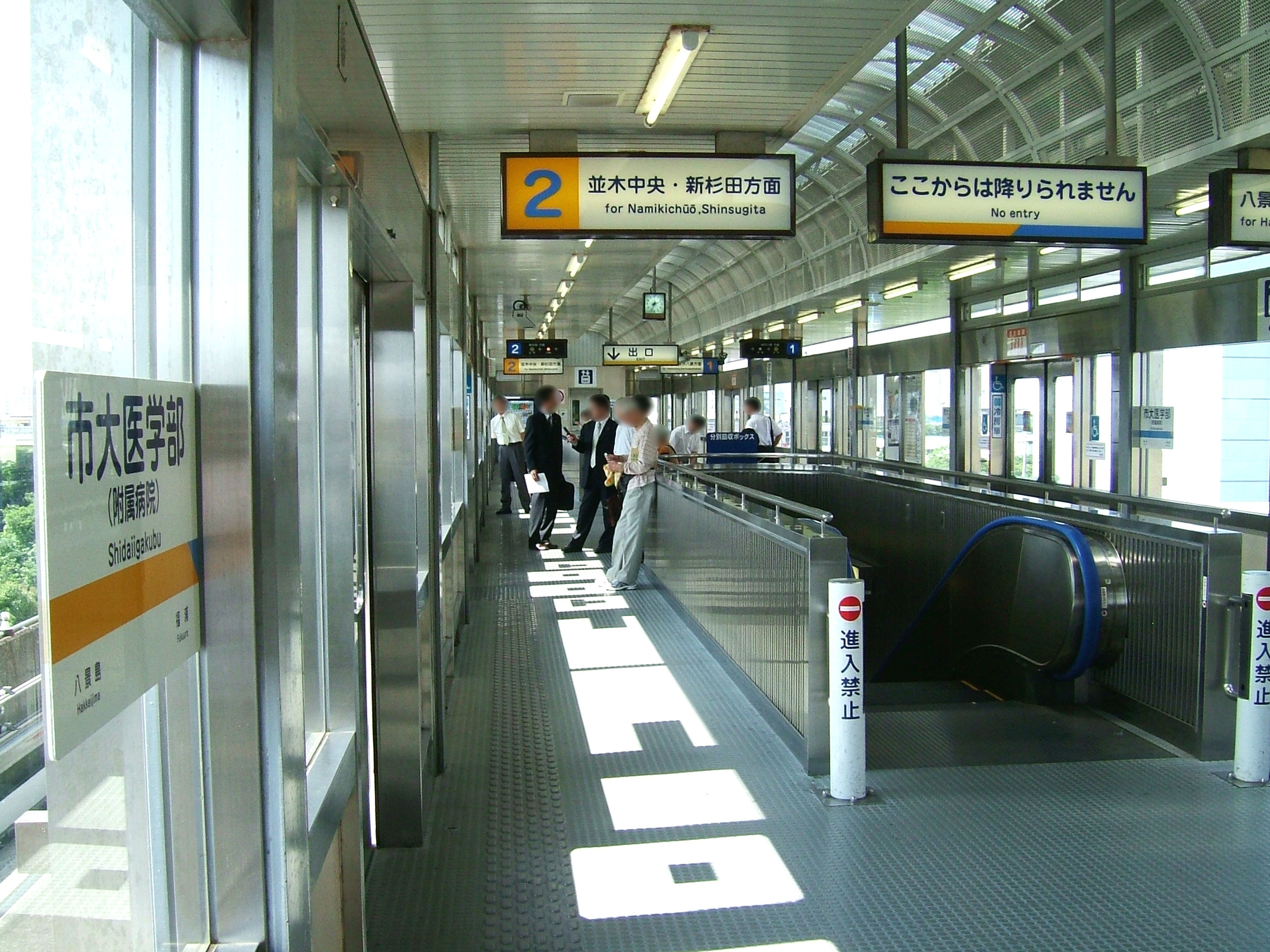
Platform

Shidai-Igakubu Station (市大医学部駅, Shidai-Igakubu-eki) is a station along the Kanazawa Seaside Line, located in Kanazawa-ku, Yokohama, Japan. It opened on 5 July 1989.

== Station Layout ==
This elevated station consists of a single island platform serving two tracks.

== Adjacent stations ==
Preceding station	Yokohama Seaside Line	Following station
Hakkeijima toward Kanazawa-Hakkei	Kanazawa Seaside Line	Fukuura toward Shin-Sugita

== History ==
The station opened on 5 July 1989, coinciding with the start of service on the Kanazawa Seaside Line between Shin-Sugita Station and Kanazawa-hakkei Station.

== Surrounding area ==
- Yokohama City University, School of Medicine (Fukuura Campus) and the University Hospital
