= Fukuura Station =

Railway station in Yokohama, Japan

Coordinates: 35.3497°N 139.6487°E

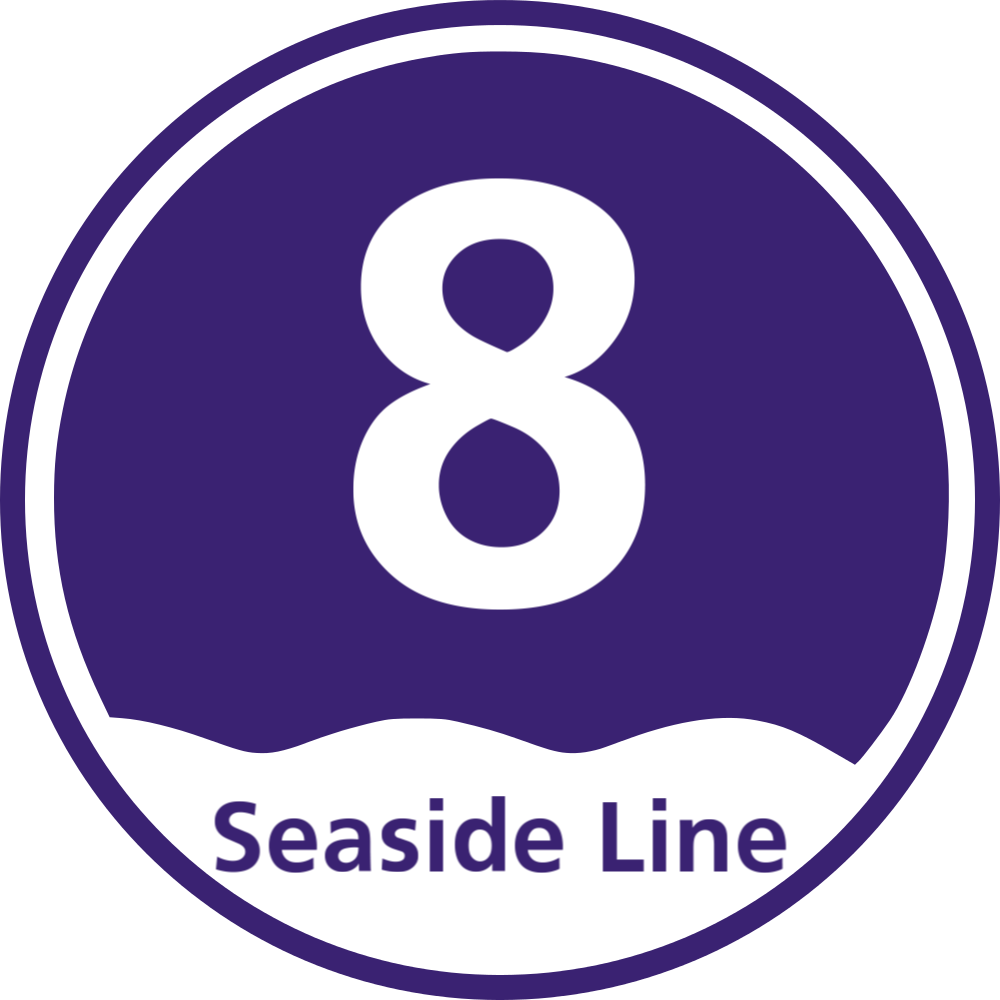

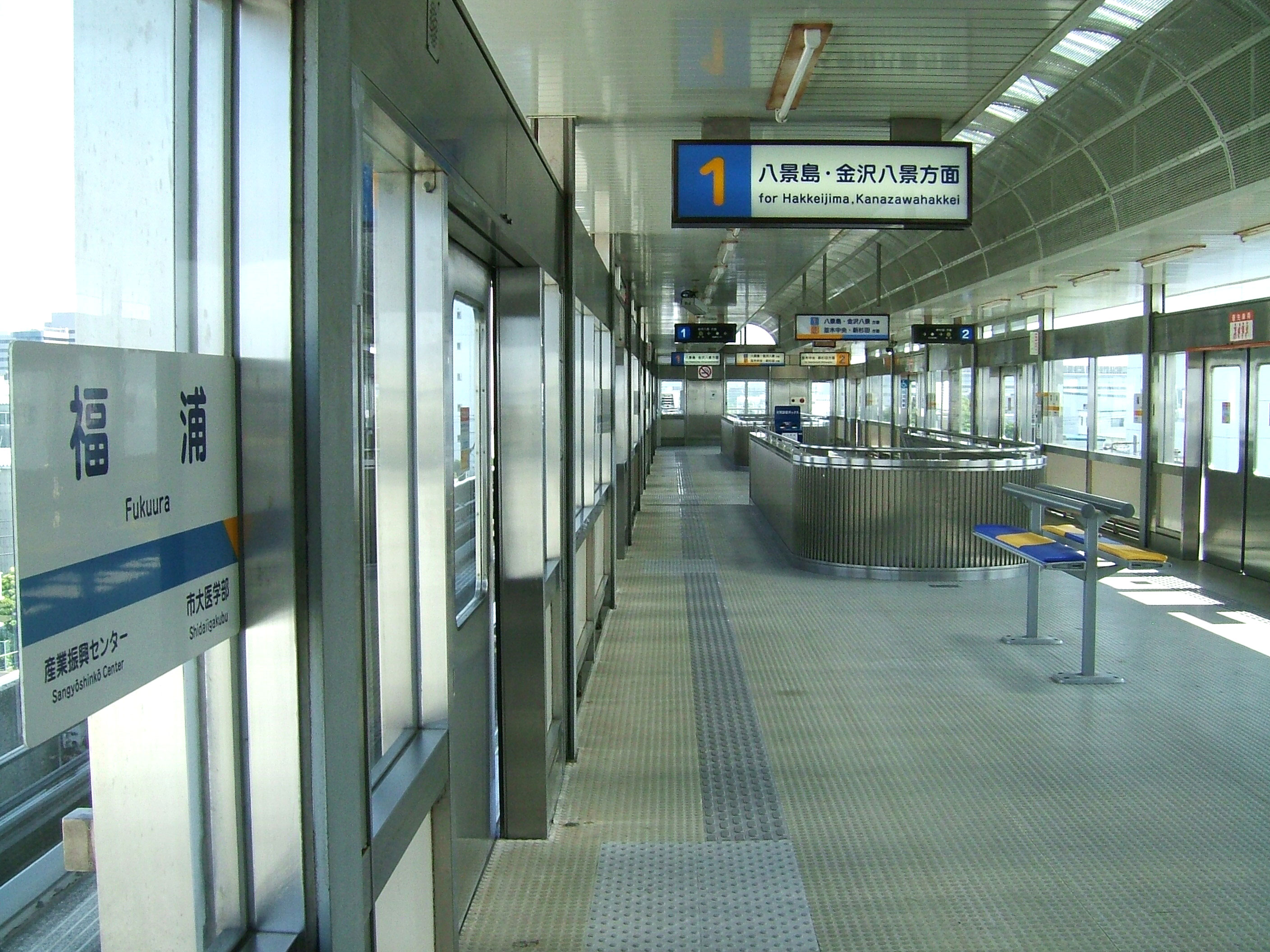
Platform

Fukuura Station (福浦駅, Fukuura-eki) is a station on the Kanazawa Seaside Line, located in Kanazawa-ku, Yokohama, Japan.

== Station Layout ==
This elevated station consists of a single island platform serving two tracks.

== History ==
The station opened on 5 July 1989, coinciding with the start of service on the Kanazawa Seaside Line between Shin-Sugita Station and Kanazawa-hakkei Station.

== Adjacent stations ==
Preceding station	Yokohama Seaside Line	Following station
Shidai-Igakubu toward Kanazawa-Hakkei	Kanazawa Seaside Line	Sangyōshinkō Center toward Shin-Sugita
