= Namiki-Chūō Station =

Railway station in Yokohama, Japan

Coordinates: 35.3653°N 139.6431°E

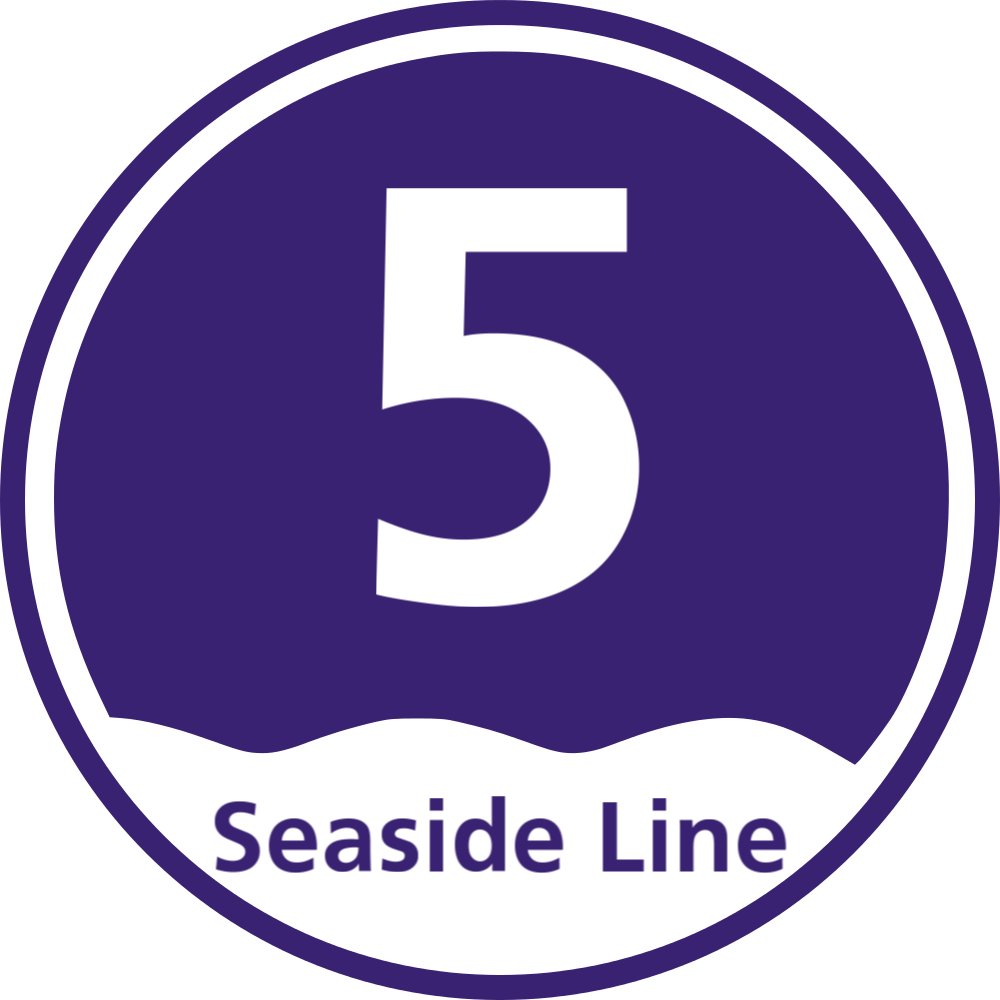

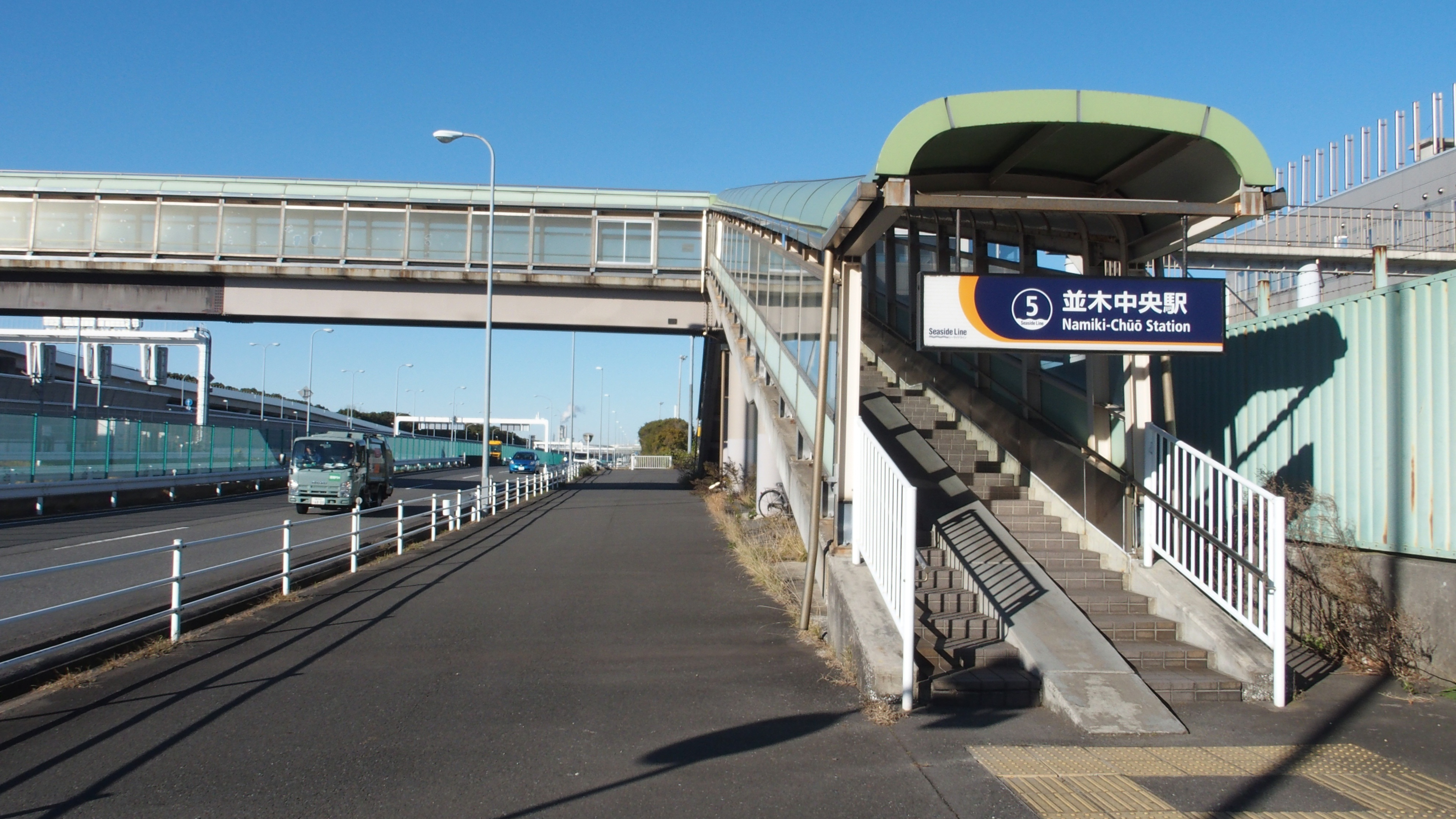
One of entrances

Namiki-Chūō Station (並木中央駅, Namiki-Chūō-eki) is a station on the Kanazawa Seaside Line, located in Kanazawa-ku, Yokohama, Japan.

== Station Layout ==
This elevated station consists of two island platforms serving three tracks. The center track is not used in regular service.

== History ==
The station opened on 5 July 1989, coinciding with the start of service on the Kanazawa Seaside Line between Shin-Sugita Station and Kanazawa-hakkei Station.

== Adjacent stations ==
Preceding station	Yokohama Seaside Line	Following station
Sachiura toward Kanazawa-Hakkei	Kanazawa Seaside Line	Namiki-Kita toward Shin-Sugita
