= Hakkeijima Station =

Railway station in Yokohama, Japan

Coordinates: 35°20′27.14″N 139°38′26.9″E

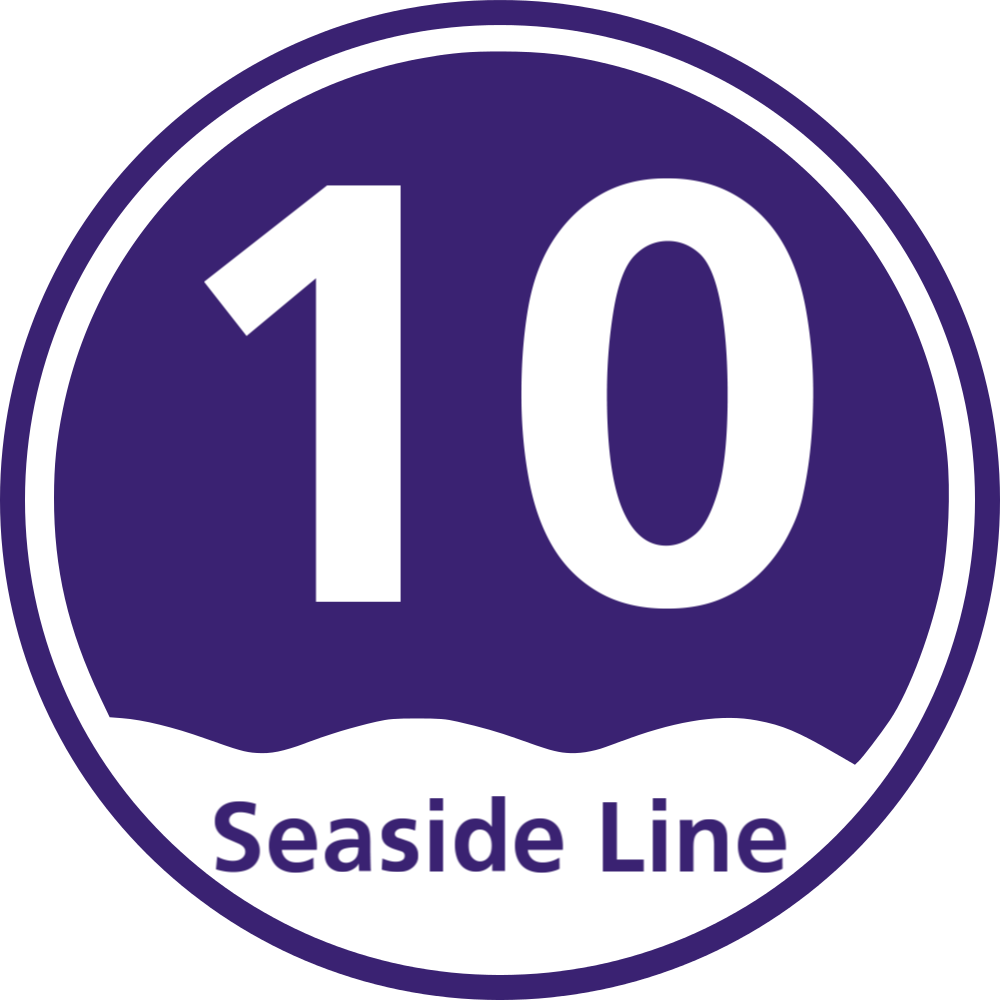

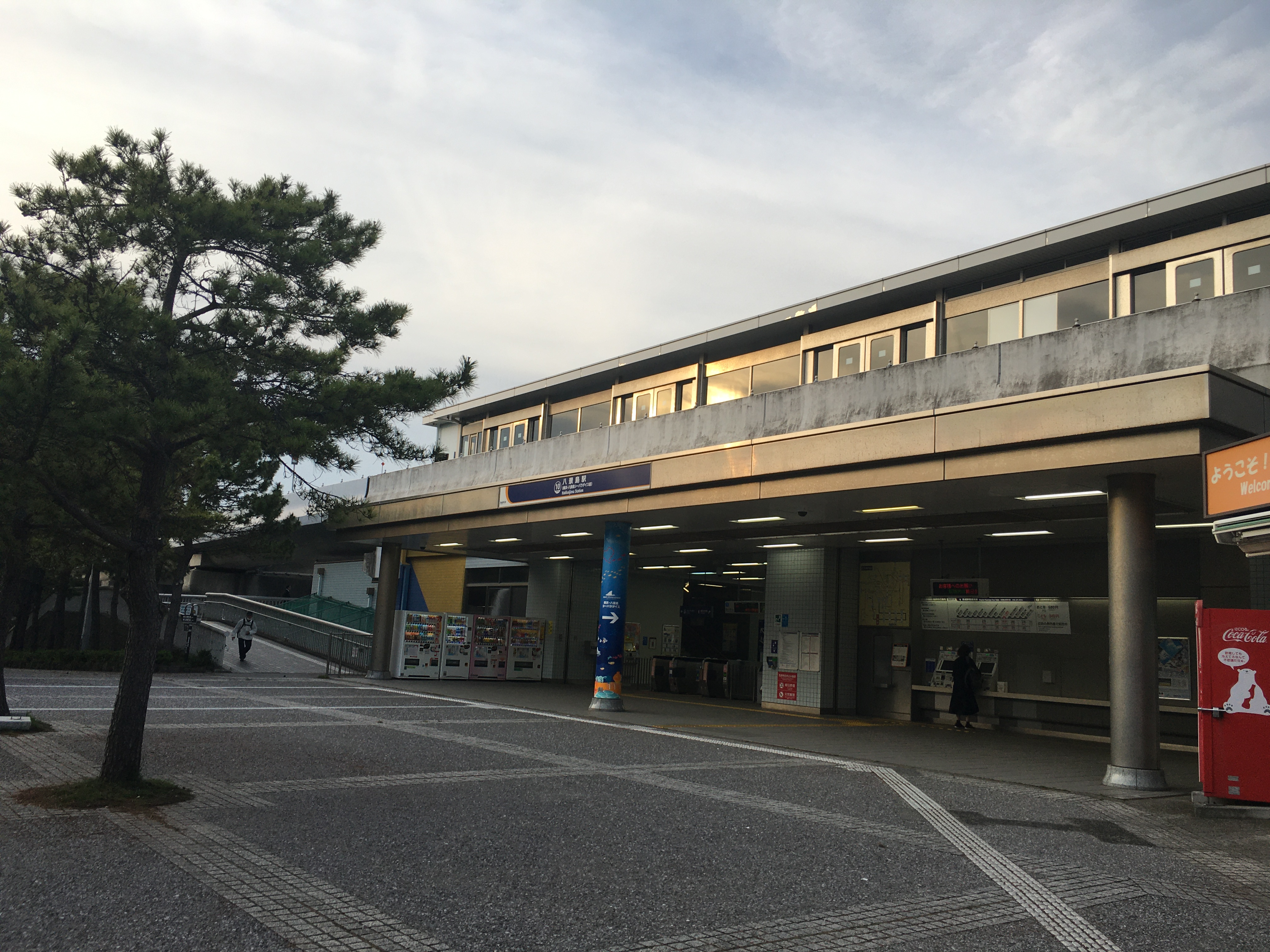
Station entrance, 2022

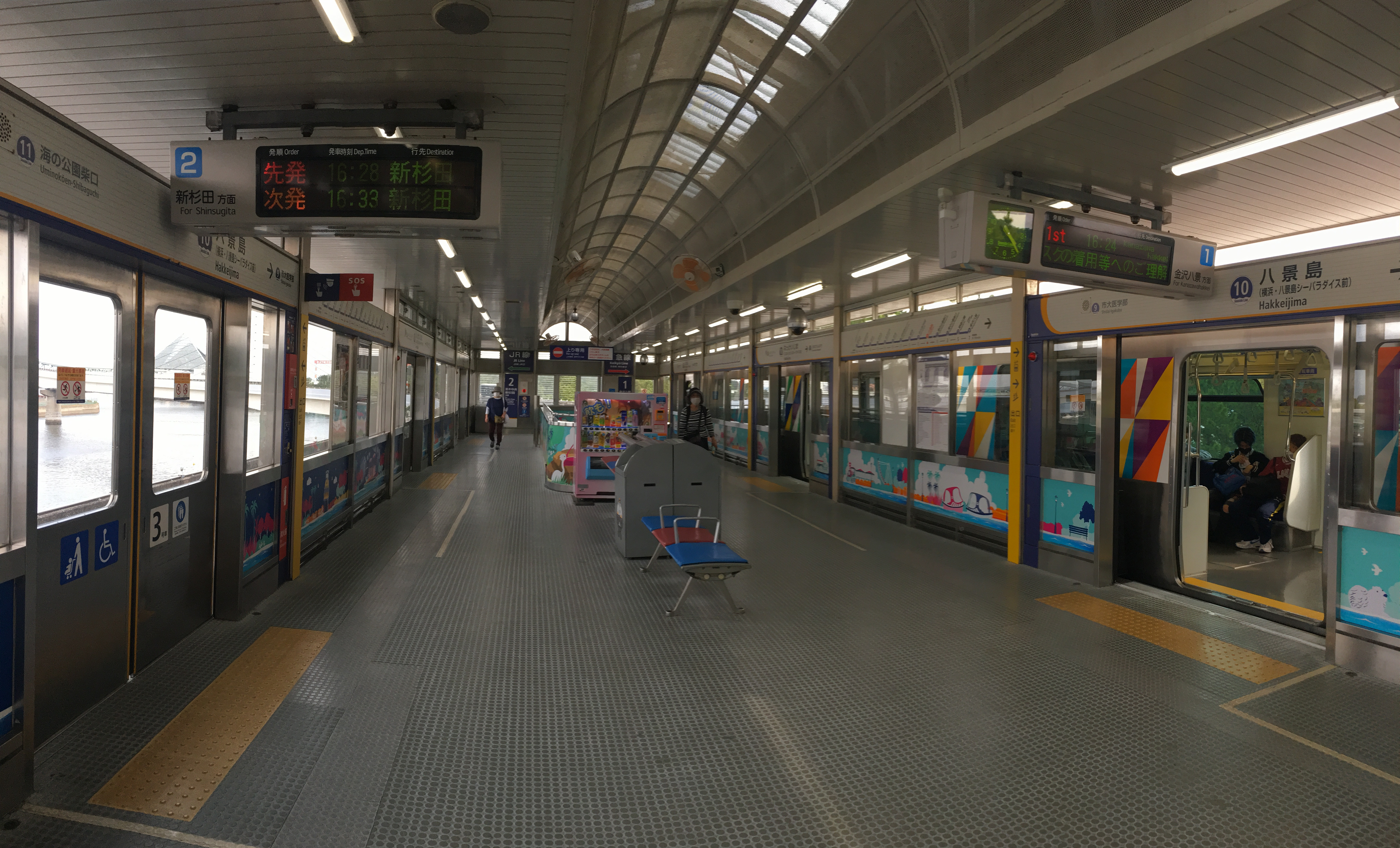
Platforms, 2022

Hakkeijima Station (八景島駅) is a station on the Kanazawa Seaside Line, located in Kanazawa-ku, Yokohama, Japan. It opened on 5 July 1989.

== Station Layout ==
This elevated station consists of a single island platform serving two tracks.

== History ==
The station opened on 5 July 1989, coinciding with the start of service on the Kanazawa Seaside Line between Shin-Sugita Station and Kanazawa-hakkei Station.

== Adjacent stations ==
Preceding station	Yokohama Seaside Line	Following station
Uminokōen-Shibaguchi toward Kanazawa-Hakkei	Kanazawa Seaside Line	Shidai-Igakubu toward Shin-Sugita

== Surrounding area ==
- Yokohama Hakkeijima Sea Paradise
