= Torihama Station =

Railway station in Yokohama, Japan

Coordinates: 35.3772°N 139.6417°E

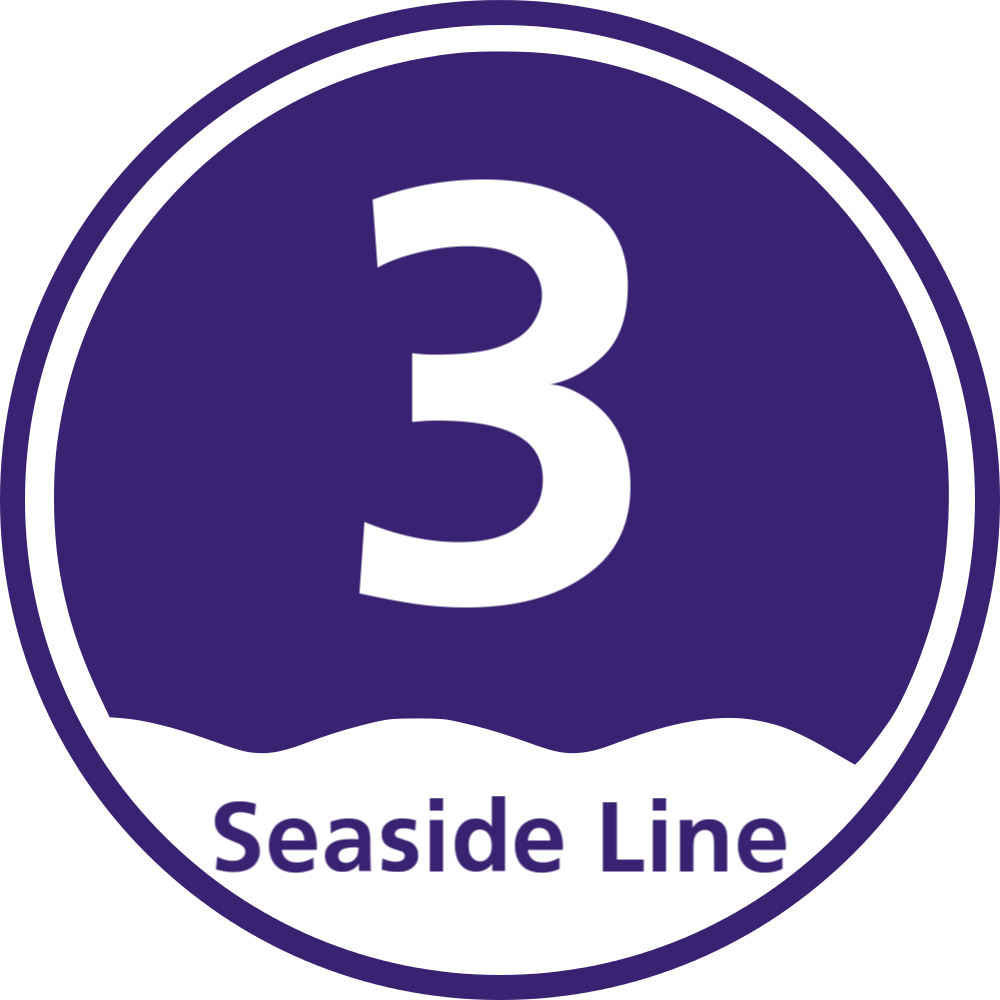

Station platform	Station entrance

Torihama Station (鳥浜駅, Torihama-eki) is a station on the Kanazawa Seaside Line in Kanazawa-ku, Yokohama, Japan.

== Station Layout ==
This elevated station consists of a single island platform serving two tracks.

== History ==
The station opened on 5 July 1989, coinciding with the start of service on the Kanazawa Seaside Line between Shin-Sugita Station and Kanazawa-hakkei Station.

== Adjacent stations ==
Preceding station	Yokohama Seaside Line	Following station
Namiki-Kita toward Kanazawa-Hakkei	Kanazawa Seaside Line	Nambu-Shijō toward Shin-Sugita
