= Nambu-Shijō Station =

Railway station in Yokohama, Japan

Coordinates: 35.3800°N 139.6331°E

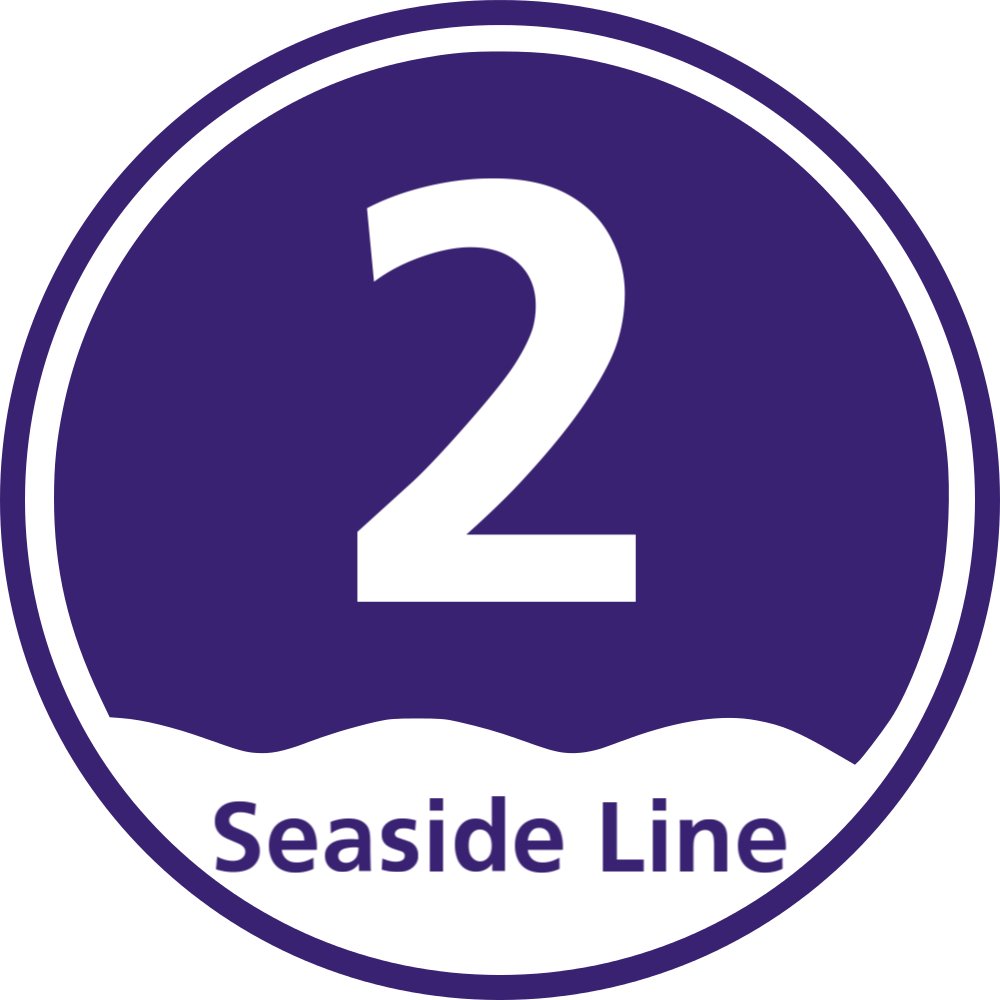

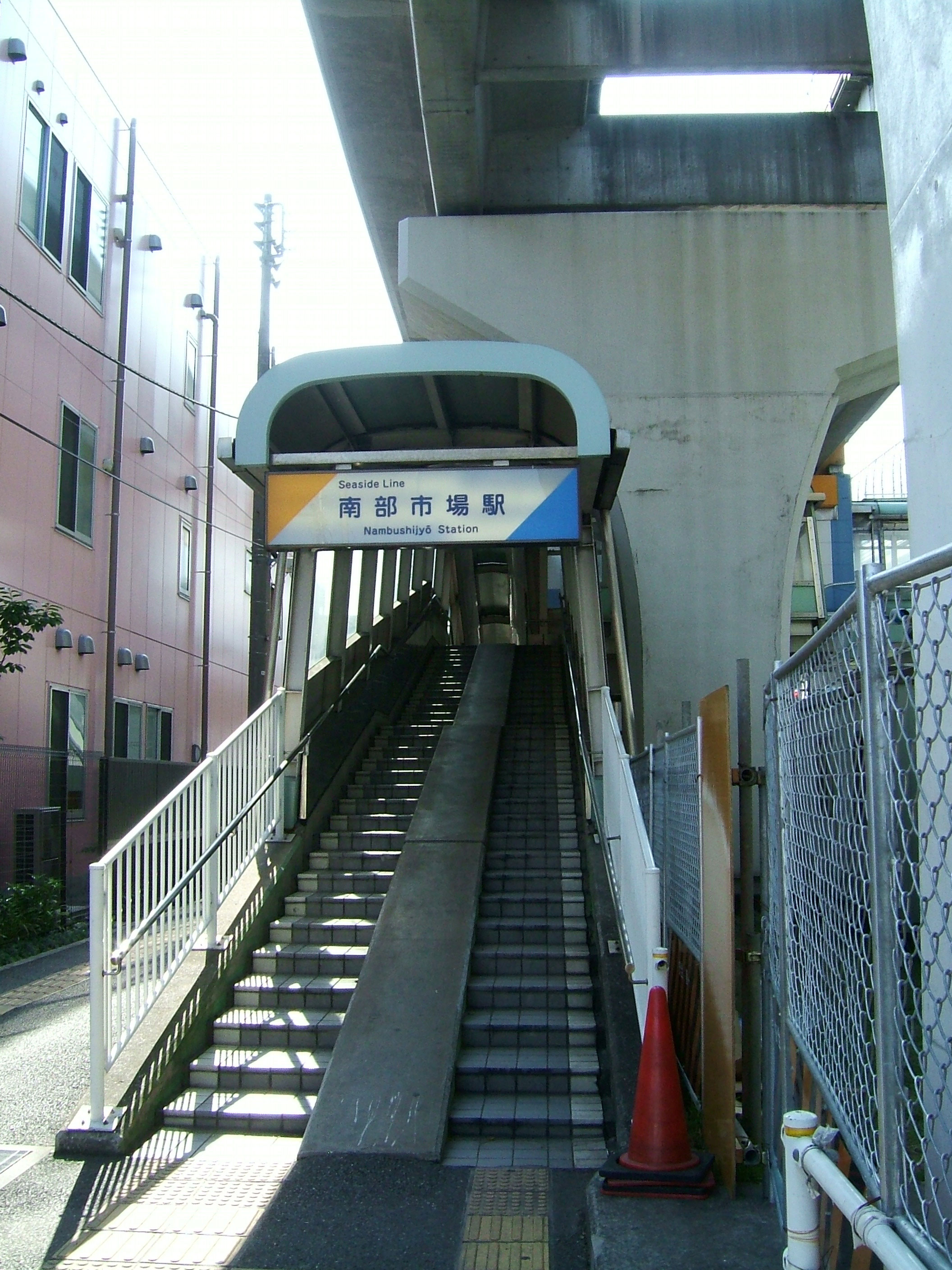
One of entrances

Nambu-Shijō Station (南部市場駅, Nanbu-Shijō-eki) is a station on the Kanazawa Seaside Line, located in Kanazawa-ku, Yokohama, Japan.

== History ==
The station opened on 5 July 1989, coinciding with the start of service on the Kanazawa Seaside Line between Shin-Sugita Station and Kanazawa-hakkei Station.

== Adjacent stations ==
Preceding station	Yokohama Seaside Line	Following station
Torihama toward Kanazawa-Hakkei	Kanazawa Seaside Line	Shin-Sugita Terminus
