= Kanazawa-ku =

Kanazawa 金沢区
- Ward
- Kanazawa Ward
- Symbol

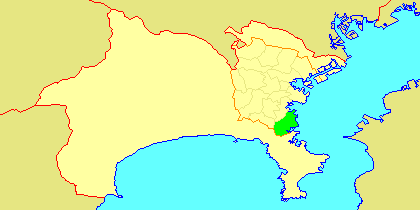
- Map of Yokohama showing Kanazawa-ku highlighted

- Kanazawa (Japan)
- Coordinates: 35°20′15″N 139°37′28″E
- Country: Japan
- Region: Kantō
- Prefecture: Kanagawa
- City: Yokohama
- Established: May 15, 1948

Area
  - Total: 31.01 km^{2} (11.97 sq mi)

Population (May 2010)
  - Total: 209,565
  - Density: 6,760/km^{2} (17,500/sq mi)
- Time zone: UTC+9 (Japan Standard Time)
- Tree: yamazakura
- Flower: Peony
- Address: 2-9-1 Deiki, Kanazawa-ku Yokohama-shi, Kanagawa-ken; 235-0016
- Website: Kanazawa Ward Office

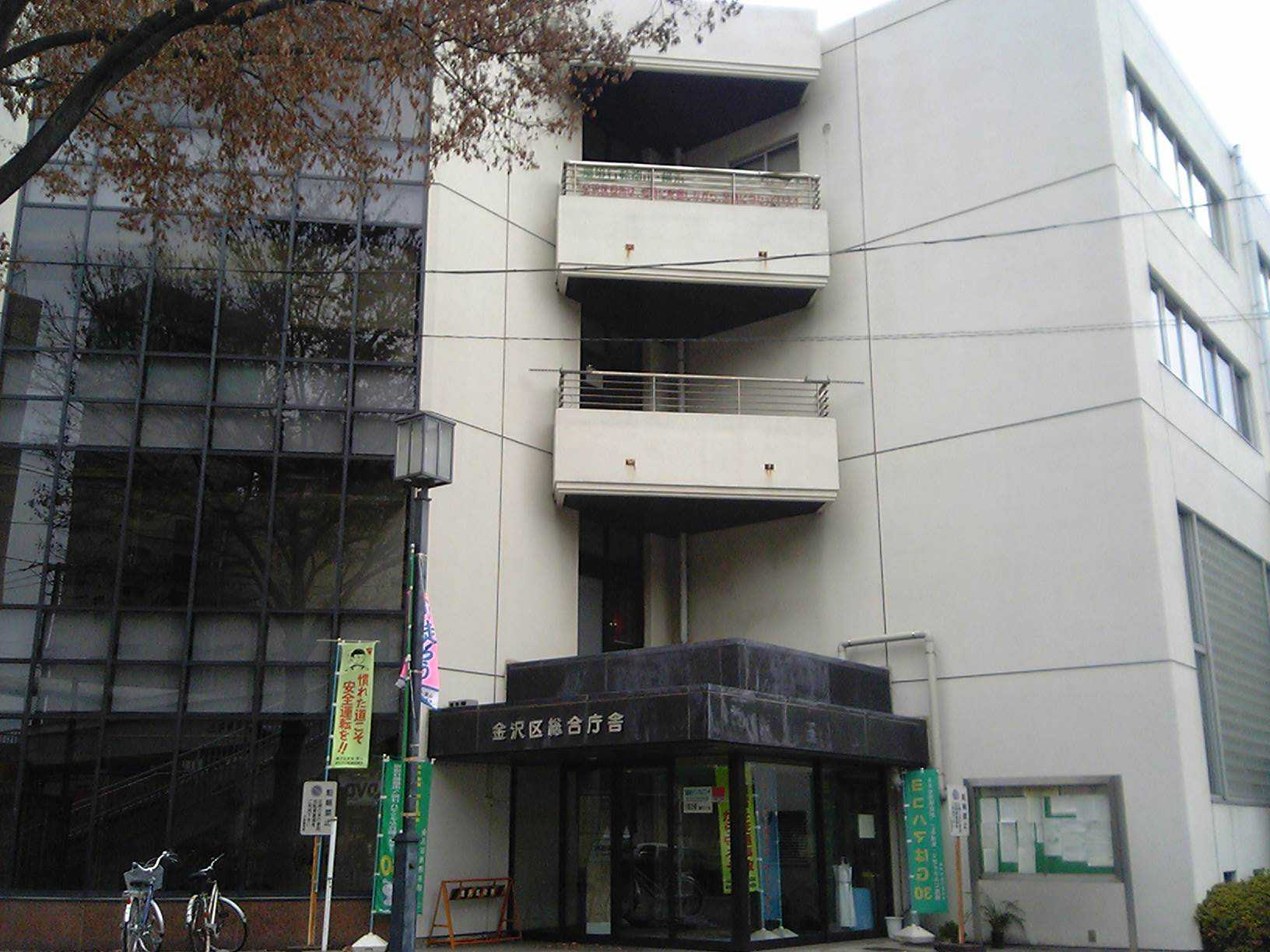
Kanazawa Ward Office

Kanazawa Ward within Yokohama

Kanazawa-ku (金沢区) is one of the 18 wards of the city of Yokohama in Kanagawa Prefecture, Japan. As of 2010, the ward had an estimated population of 209,565 and a density of 6,760 persons per km^{2}. The total area was 31.01 km^{2} (11.97 sq mi). The ward symbol, established 1987, expresses the image of sea, waves, and a sea gull.

== History ==
The area around present-day Kanazawa Ward has been inhabited for thousands of years. Archaeologists have found stone tools from the Japanese Paleolithic period and ceramic shards from the Jōmon period at numerous locations in the area. Under the Nara period Ritsuryō system, it became part of Kuraki District in Musashi Province. By the Kamakura period it was part of a shōen controlled by the Hōjō clan, who established a major seaport for the Kamakura shogunate at Mutsuura, and a noted library and educational center at Kanazawa Bunko.

During the Edo period, much of the area was part of the tenryō territory in Musashi Province controlled directly by the Tokugawa shogunate, but administered through various hatamoto. In 1726, a large portion of the present ward came under the control of the newly established Mutsuura Domain ruled by the Yonekura clan. The area consisted of small farming and fishing villages. During the Bakumatsu period, the area offshore Kanazawa was an anchorage for the American black ships under command of Commodore Matthew C. Perry in 1853 and 1854. After the signing of the Treaty of Amity and Commerce in 1858, it was one of the first areas in Japan opened to foreign trade. In 1871, with the abolition of the han system following the Meiji Restoration, the area became part of Kuraki District in the new Kanagawa Prefecture. In 1887, Itō Hirobumi and a group of political scholars completed the final drafts of the Meiji Constitution while secluded in an inn in Kanazawa. In the cadastral reform of April 1, 1889, the area was divided into numerous villages. The area was connected by rail to Yokohama with the opening of the Shōnan Electric Railway (the predecessor of the modern Keihin Electric Express Railway) in 1930. In October 1936, Kuraki District was abolished, and the area was absorbed into Yokohama City, becoming part of Isogo Ward. A large railway carriage factory was established in Kanazawa Ward in 1946 by the Tokyu Corporation on the site of a former Imperial Japanese Navy Technical Center. Kanazawa Ward gained its independence from Isogo Ward in May 1948.

== Geography ==
Kanazawa Ward is located in eastern Kanagawa Prefecture, and in the southeast corner of the city of Yokohama. The area is largely flatland, with scattered small hills. The Ward is bordered to the east by Tokyo Bay.

=== Surrounding municipalities ===
- Isogo Ward
- Sakae Ward
- Kamakura
- Zushi
- Yokosuka

== Economy ==
Kanazawa Ward is largely a regional commercial center and bedroom community for central Yokohama, Kawasaki and Tokyo.

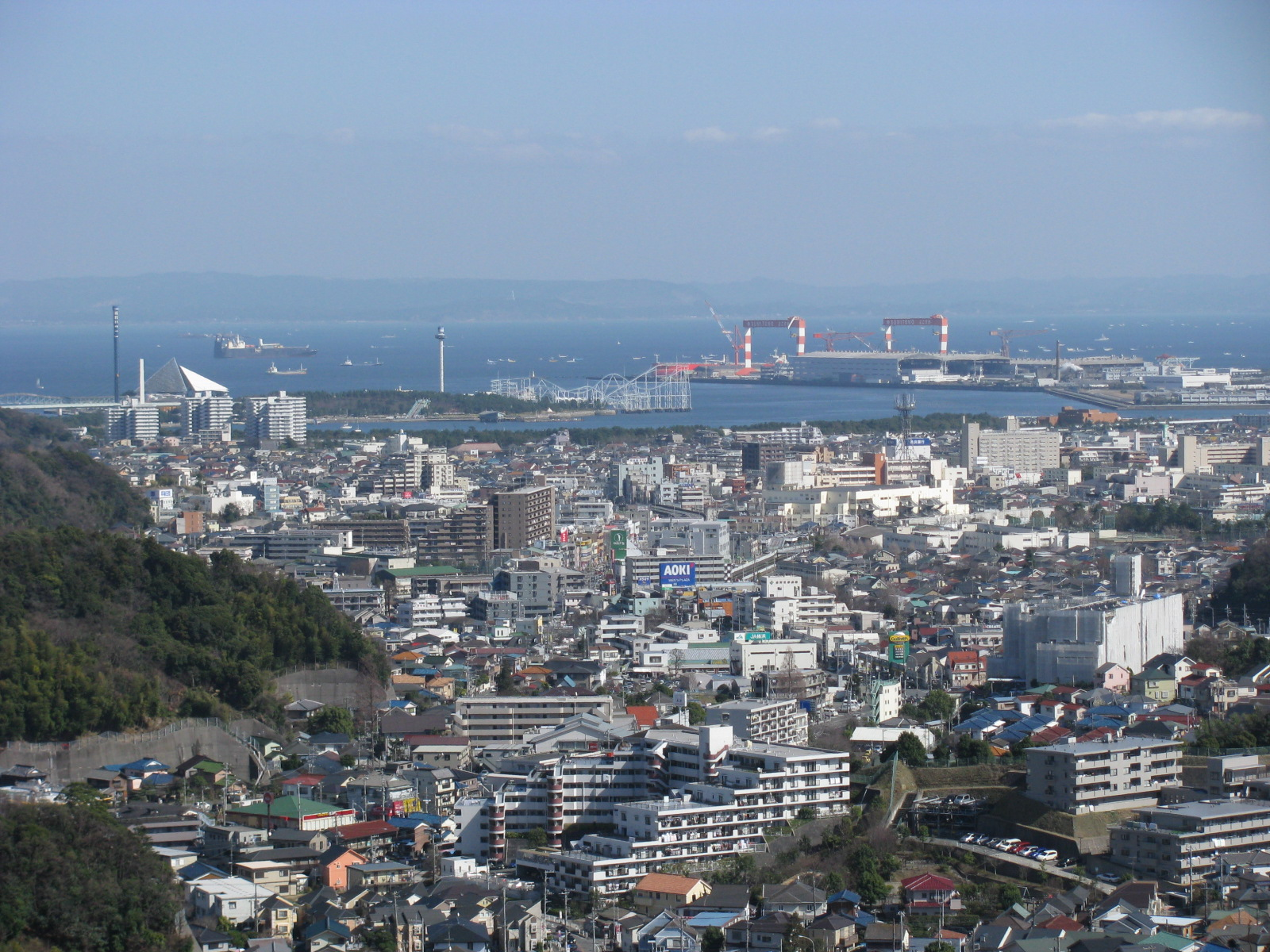
Kanazawa Ward, Yokohama, Japan, Asia, Earth

== Transportation ==
=== Railroads ===
- Keihin Electric Express Railway-Keikyū Main Line
  - Keikyū Tomioka - Nōkendai - Kanazawa-Bunko - Kanazawa-Hakkei
- Keihin Electric Express Railway-Keikyū Zushi Line
  - Kanazawa-Hakkei - Mutsuura
- Yokohama New Transit Co., Ltd - Kanazawa Seaside Line
  - Nambu-Shijō - Torihama - Namiki-Kita - Namiki-Chūō - Sachiura - Sangyōshinkō Center - Fukuura - Shidai-Igakubu - Hakkeijima - Uminokōen-Shibaguchi - Uminokōen-Minamiguchi - Nojimakōen - Kanazawa-Hakkei

=== Highways ===
- Bayshore Route
- Yokohama-Yokosuka Route
- Japan National Route 16
- Route 357 (Japan)

==== Prefecture roads ====
- Kanagawa Prefecture Road 23
- Kanagawa Prefecture Road 204
- Kanagawa Prefecture Road 205

== Attractions ==
- Kanazawa Bunko
- Yokohama Hakkeijima Sea Paradise

== Sports centers ==
- Rinetsu Kanazawa (pool)
- Sports center of Kanazawa (indoor gym)

== Beaches ==
- Nojima Beach—It is the last remaining natural beach in Yokohama city. The beach is shallow for a good distance from the shore.
- Umi no Kouen—A city park with an artificial beach. The sand was carried by ship from Chiba prefecture. Visitors can go shellfish gathering there.

== Fishing ports ==
- Shiba fishing port
- Kanazawa fishing port

== Education ==
Tertiary:

- Yokohama City University
- Kanto Gakuin University

Kanagawa Prefectural Board of Education operates prefectural high schools:

- Kanazawa Sogo High School
- Kamariya High School

Yokohama Municipal Board of Education operates the following municipal high schools:

- Kanazawa High School

Private high schools:

- Yokohama So-Gakukan High School
- Yokohama Junior & Senior High School
- Kanto Gakuin Matsuura Junior/Senior High School

The municipal board of education also operates public junior and senior high schools.

Nishi Kanazawa Elementary/Junior High School a.k.a. Nishi Kanazawa Gakuen (西金沢学園) is a combined elementary and junior high school in Kanazawa-ku.

Junior high schools:

- Daido (大道)
- Kamariya (釜利谷)
- Kanazawa (金沢)
- Koda (小田)
- Mutsuura (六浦)
- Namiki (並木)
- Nishishiba (西柴)
- Tomioka (富岡)
- Tomioka Higashi (富岡東)

Elementary schools:

- Asahina (朝比奈)
- Bunko (文庫)
- Daido (大道)
- Hakkei (八景)
- Kamariya (釜利谷)
- Kamariya Higashi (釜利谷東)
- Kamariya Minami (釜利谷南)
- Kanazawa (金沢)
- Koda (小田)
- Mutsuura (六浦)
- Mutsuura Minami (六浦南)
- Nishi Shiba (西柴)
- Nishi Tomioka (西富岡)
- Nokendai (能見台)
- Nokendai Minami (能見台南)
- Segasaki (瀬ケ崎)
- Takafunedai (高舟台)
- Tomiki Chuo (Central) (並木中央)
- Tomiki Daiichi (No. 1) (並木第一)
- Tomiki Daiyon (No. 4) (並木第四)
- Tomioka (富岡)

Additionally, Bairin Elementary School (梅林小学校), outside of Kanazawa-ku, has an attendance zone that includes a part of Kanazawa-ku.

== Famous people ==
- Teruo Iwamoto – professional soccer player
- Kazumasa Oda – singer, songwriter
- Koizumi Matajirō – politician
- Naoto Takenaka – actor
- Yuta Tabuse – professional basketball player
- Kota Yabu – actor, singer
- Max Matsuura – record producer
- Mitsuru Igarashi – musician
- Kōichirō Uno – novelist
- Katsumi Asaba – art director
- Tadanobu Asano – actor
