= Kanazawa Seaside Line =

Automated guideway transit line in Yokohama, Japan

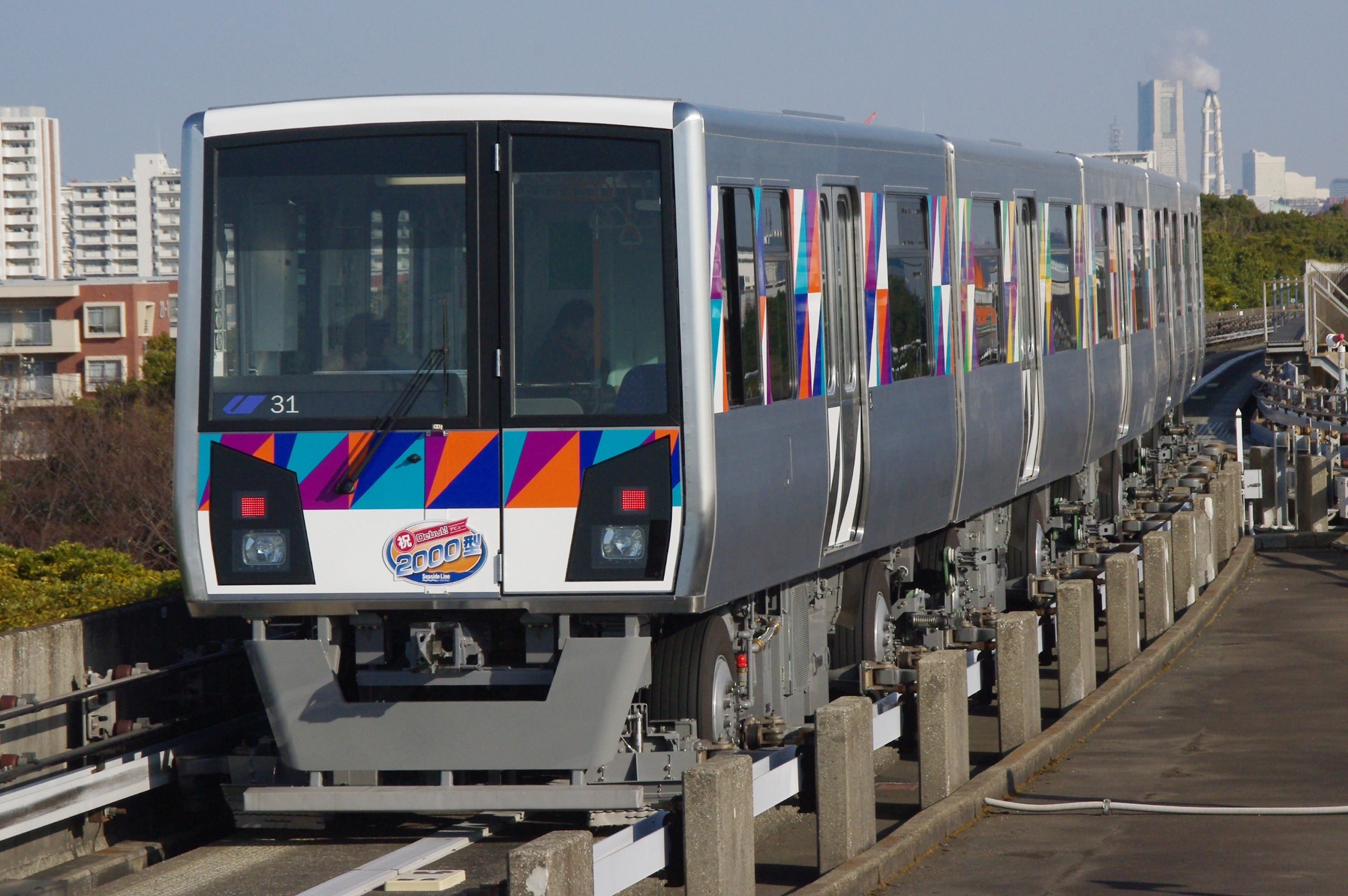

Overview
- Owner: Yokohama Seaside Line Co., Ltd.
- Locale: Kanagawa Prefecture, Japan
- Termini: Shin-Sugita; Kanazawa-Hakkei
- Stations: 14

Service
- Type: Automated guideway transit
- Rolling stock: 2000 series

History
- Opened: July 5, 1989; 37 years ago

Technical
- Line length: 10.6 km (6.6 mi)
- Electrification: Conductor rail, 750 V DC
Route map
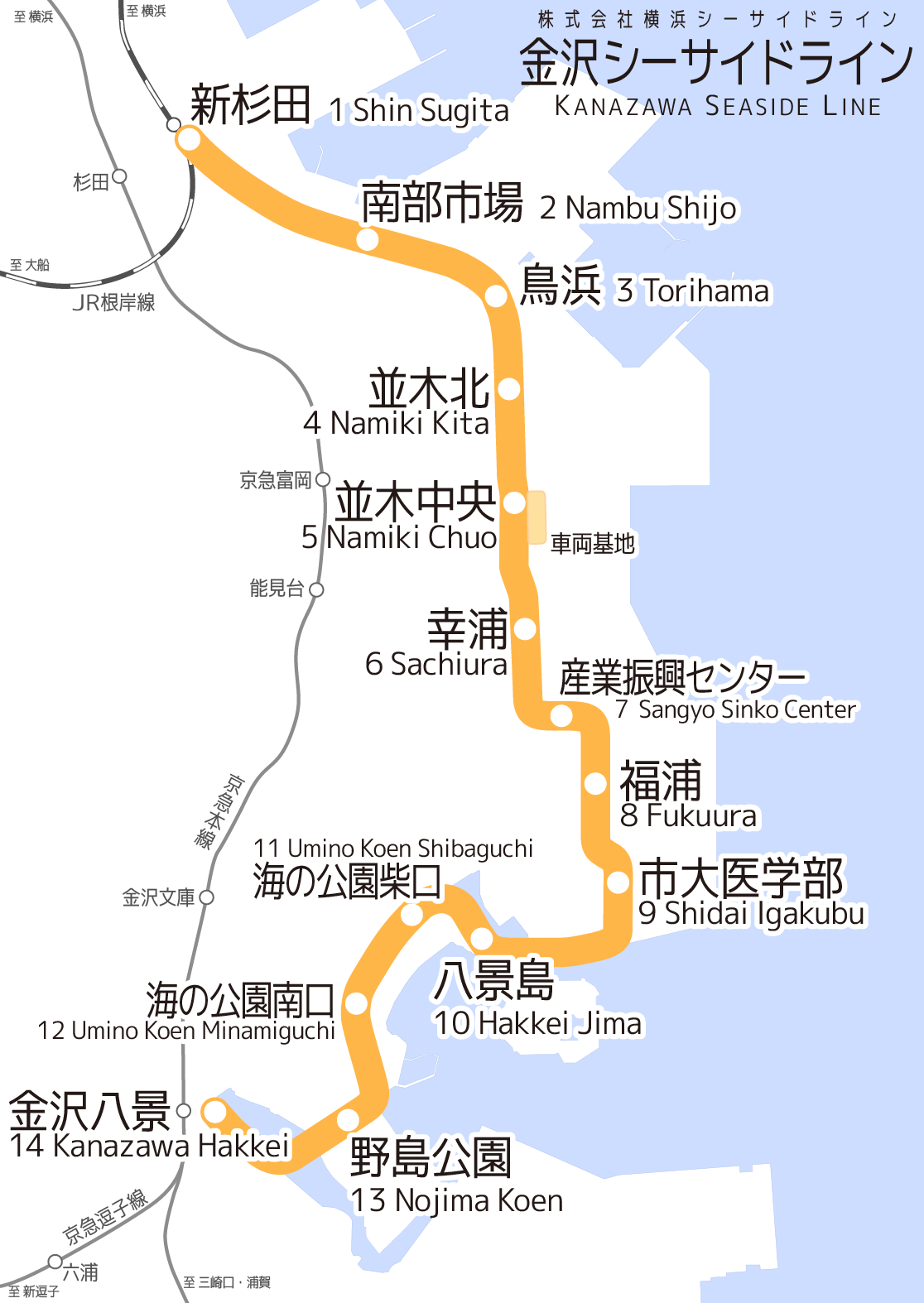

Riding along the Kanazawa Seaside Line with a vehicle going in the opposite direction, 2022

The Kanazawa Seaside Line (Japanese: 金沢シーサイド線, Hepburn: Kanazawa Shīsaido Sen) is an automated guideway transit line operated by Yokohama Seaside Line Co., Ltd. (株式会社横浜シーサイドライン, Kabushiki-gaisha Yokohama Shīsaido Rain) which operates between Shin-Sugita in Isogo Ward to Kanazawa-Hakkei in Kanazawa Ward in Yokohama. It opened on July 5, 1989.

The operator company was called Yokohama New Transit Co., Ltd. (横浜新都市交通株式会社, Yokohama Shintoshi Kōtsū Kabushiki-gaisha) until the name change on October 1, 2013.

== Accident ==
On 1 June 2019 at 20:15 (JST), a train ran in the opposite direction and collided with the buffers, injuring about 20 passengers at Shin-Sugita Station.

== Station list ==
No.	Station name	Distance	Transfers	Location
1	Shin-Sugita	0.0 km (0 mi)	Negishi Line (JK05)	Isogo-ku, Yokohama
2	Nambu-Shijō	1.3 km (0.81 mi)		Kanazawa-ku, Yokohama
3	Torihama	2.2 km (1.4 mi)		Kanazawa-ku, Yokohama
4	Namiki-Kita	2.8 km (1.7 mi)		Kanazawa-ku, Yokohama
5	Namiki-Chūō	3.5 km (2.2 mi)		Kanazawa-ku, Yokohama
6	Sachiura	4.3 km (2.7 mi)		Kanazawa-ku, Yokohama
7	Sangyō-Shinkō-Center	5.0 km (3.1 mi)		Kanazawa-ku, Yokohama
8	Fukuura	5.6 km (3.5 mi)		Kanazawa-ku, Yokohama
9	Shidai-Igakubu	6.3 km (3.9 mi)		Kanazawa-ku, Yokohama
10	Hakkeijima	7.5 km (4.7 mi)		Kanazawa-ku, Yokohama
11	Uminokōen-Shibaguchi	8.1 km (5.0 mi)		Kanazawa-ku, Yokohama
12	Uminokōen-Minamiguchi	8.8 km (5.5 mi)		Kanazawa-ku, Yokohama
13	Nojimakōen	9.6 km (6.0 mi)		Kanazawa-ku, Yokohama
14	Kanazawa-Hakkei	10.6 km (6.6 mi)	Keikyu Main Line (KK53); Keikyu Zushi Line (KK53)	Kanazawa-ku, Yokohama
