= Shin-Sugita Station =

Railway and Automated Guideway Transit (AGT) station in Yokohama, Japan

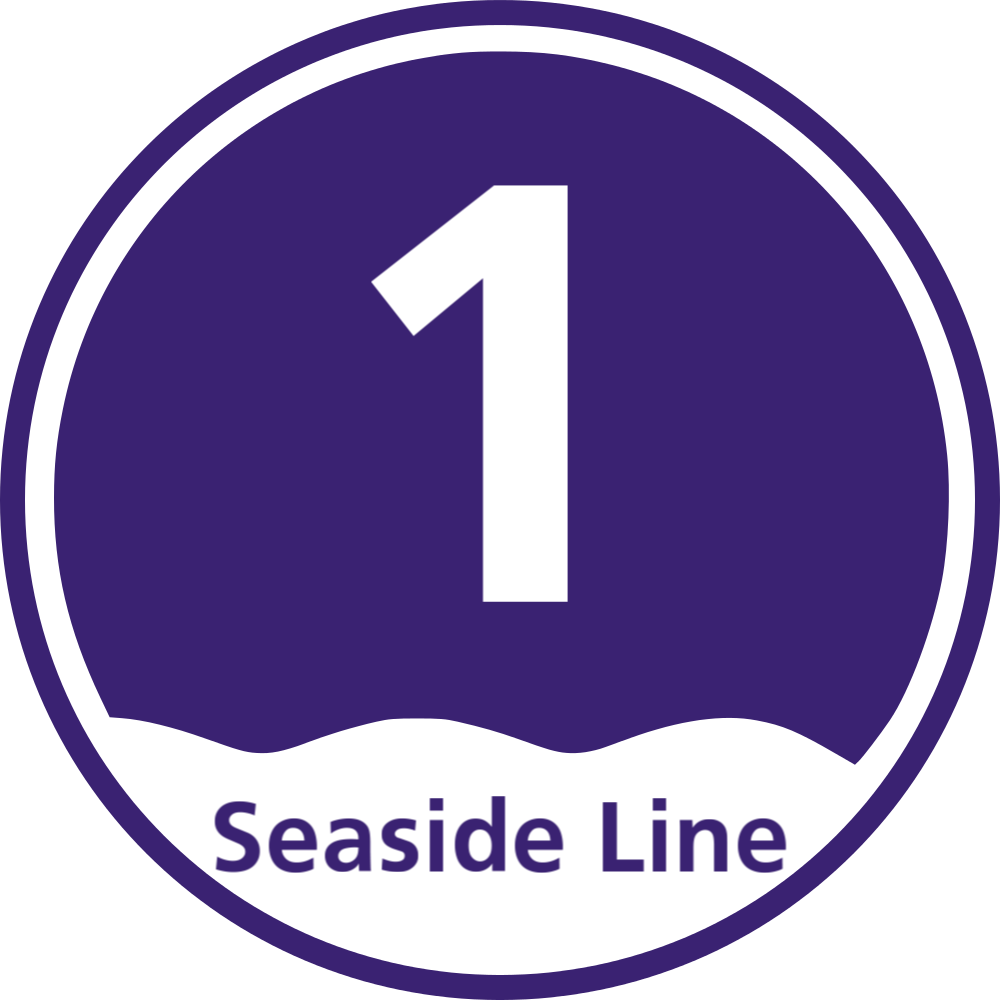
JK05 Shin-Sugita Station 新杉田駅

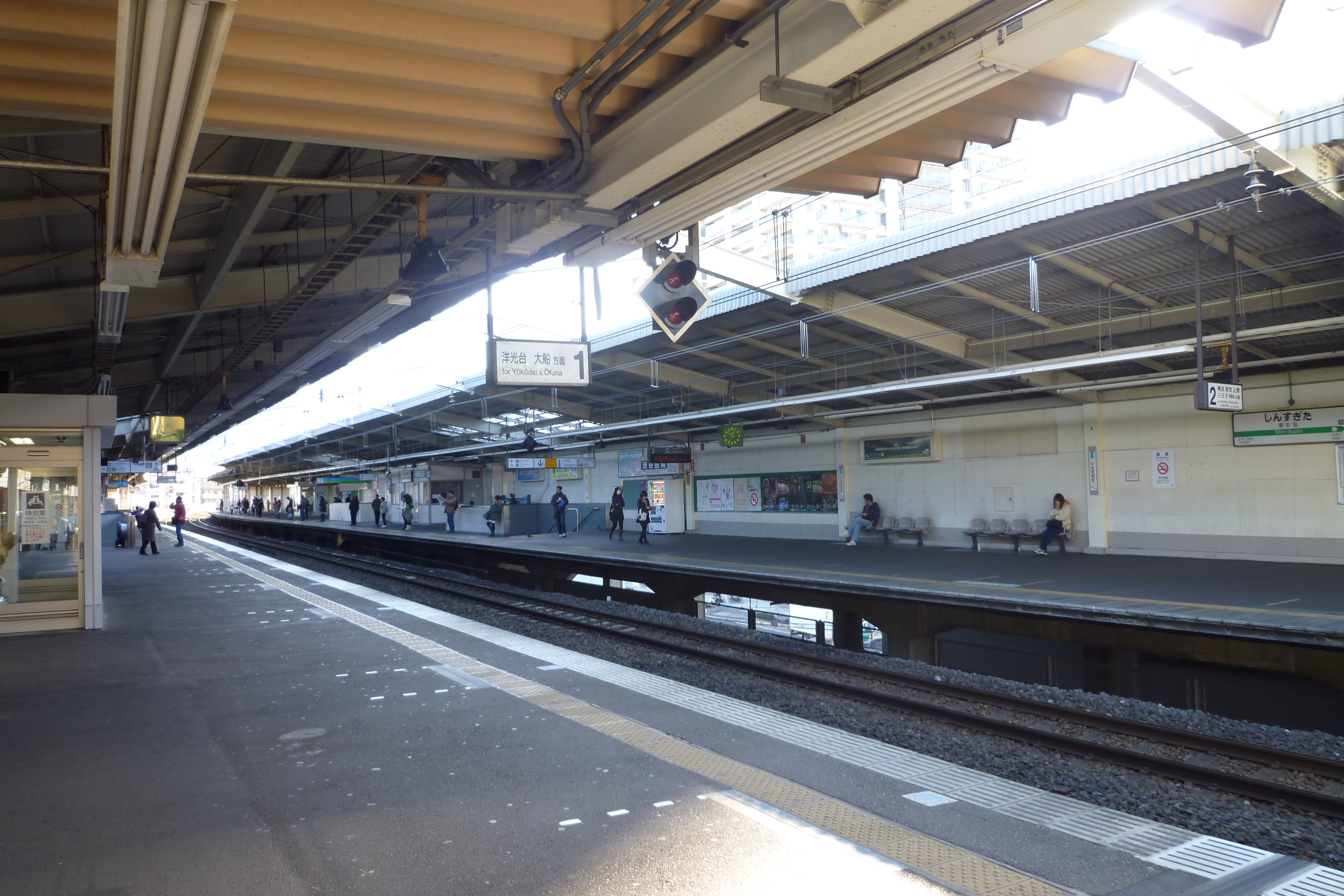
- JR Shin-Sugita station platforms

General information
- Location: 6 Shin-Sugita-cho, Isogo-ku, Yokohama-shi, Kanagawa-ken 235-0032; Japan
- Coordinates: 35.3863°N 139.6201°E
- Operator: JR East; Yokohama Seaside Line
- Lines: Negishi Line; Kanazawa Seaside Line

Other information
- Status: Staffed (Midori no Madoguchi)

History
- Opened: 17 March 1970

Passengers
- FY2019: 36,810 (JR East); 32,090 (Kanazawa Seaside Line) daily

Services
Preceding station	JR East	Following station
Yōkōdai JK04 towards Ōfuna	Negishi Line	Isogo JK06 towards Yokohama
Yōkōdai JK04 towards Ōfuna	Yokohama Line Local	Isogo JK06 towards Hachiōji
Preceding station	Yokohama Seaside Line	Following station
Nambu-Shijo toward Kanazawa-Hakkei	Kanazawa Seaside Line	Terminus
Location
- Location within Kanagawa Prefecture Location within Japan

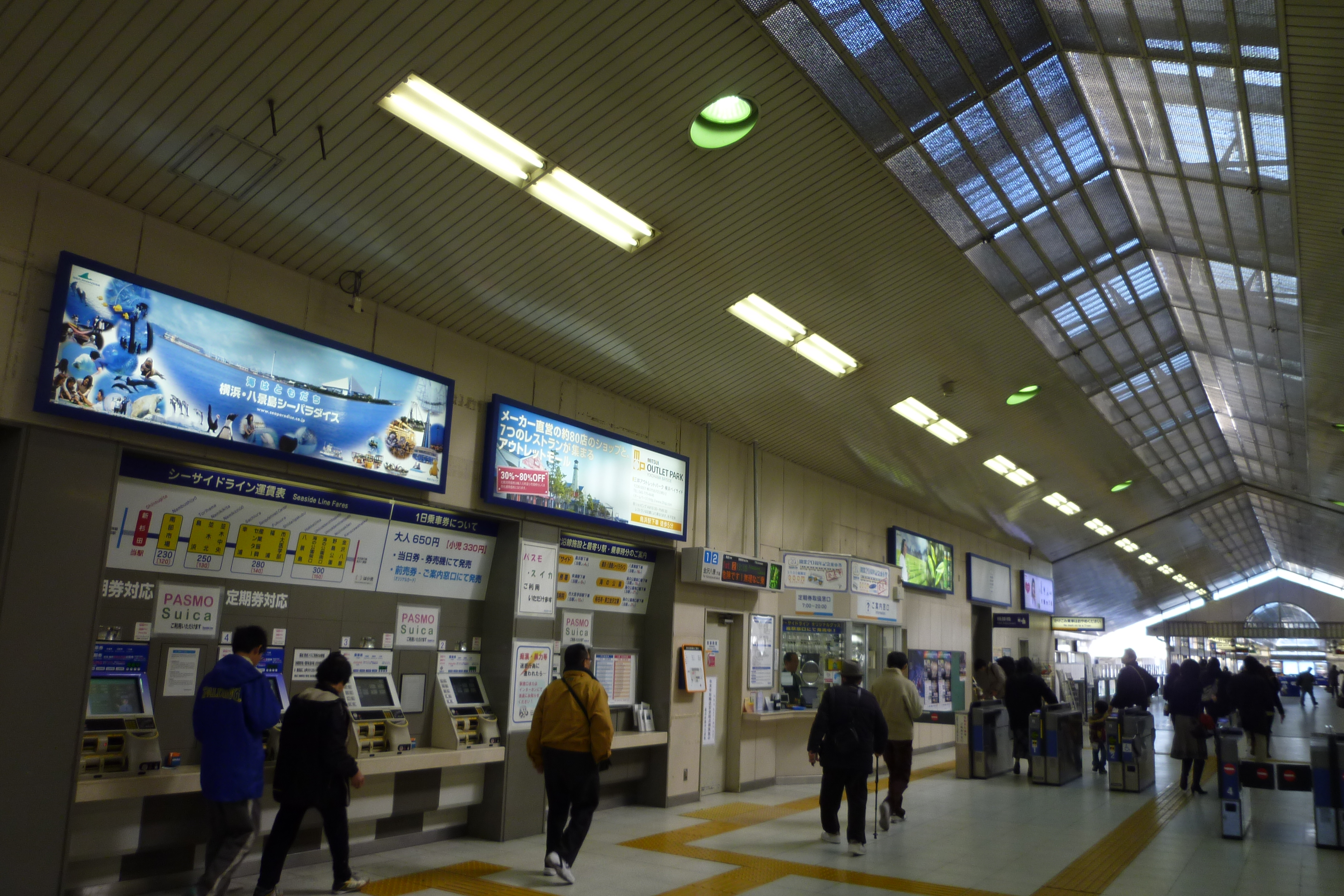
Kanazawa Seaside Line Shin-Sugita Station ticket gates

Shin-Sugita Station (新杉田駅, Shin-Sugita-eki) is an interchange passenger railway station located in Isogo-ku, Yokohama, Kanagawa Prefecture, Japan, operated by the East Japan Railway Company (JR East) and the Yokohama New Transit Company.

== Lines ==
Shin-Sugita Station is served by the Negishi Line from Yokohama to Ōfuna in Kanagawa Prefecture. with through services inter-running to and from the Keihin-Tōhoku Line and also the Yokohama Line. It is 11.1 kilometers from the terminus of the Negishi line at Yokohama, and 70.2 kilometers from the northern terminus of the Keihin-Tōhoku Line at Ōmiya. Shin-Sugita is also a terminal station for the Kanazawa Seaside Line.

== Station layout ==
The JR station consists of two opposed elevated platforms serving two tracks, with the station building underneath. The station has a "Midori no Madoguchi" staffed ticket office. The Kanazawa New Seaside Line has a single elevated bay platform.

=== JR platforms ===
1	Negishi Line	for Kōnandai and Ōfuna
2	Negishi Line-Keihin-Tohoku Line	for Yokohama, Tokyo, and Ōmiya
2	Yokohama Line	for Yokohama, Nagatsuta, Machida, and Hachiōji

=== Kanazawa Seaside Line platforms ===
1/2	■ Kanazawa Seaside Line	for Torihama, Hakkeijima, and Kanazawa-Hakkei

== History ==
The area around Shin-Sugita Station was formerly a rural pocket within downtown Yokohama. The property was developed into a large housing district in the early 1970s. The Japanese National Railways (JNR) Keihin-Tōhoku Line was extended from its former terminus at Isogo Station, and Shin-Sugita Station was opened on 17 March 1970. The line was further extended to Ōfuna Station in 1973. The station came under the management of JR East on April 1, 1987 after the privatization of JNR. A new station building was completed in 1989. On 5 July 1989, the Kanazawa Seaside Line began operations from Shin-Sugita Station to Kanazawa Hakkei. The station building was remodeled in 2007.

== Passenger statistics ==
In fiscal 2019, the JR East station was used by an average of 36,810 passengers daily (boarding passengers only). During the same period, the Yokohama New Transit station was used by an average of 32,090 passengers daily (boarding passengers only).

The passenger figures (boarding passengers only) for previous years are as shown below.

Fiscal year	JR East	Seaside Line
2005	34,447	15,491
2010	36,686	16,194
2015	38,498	16,730

== Surrounding area ==
- Sakae Ward Office
- Sakae Library
- Yokohama Sakae Mutual Aid Hospital
- Kanagawa Prefectural Hakuyo High School
- Hongodai Ekimae housing complex

== See also ==
- List of railway stations in Japan
