= Kanazawa-hakkei Station =

Railway station in Yokohama, Japan

Coordinates: 35°19′52″N 139°37′13″E

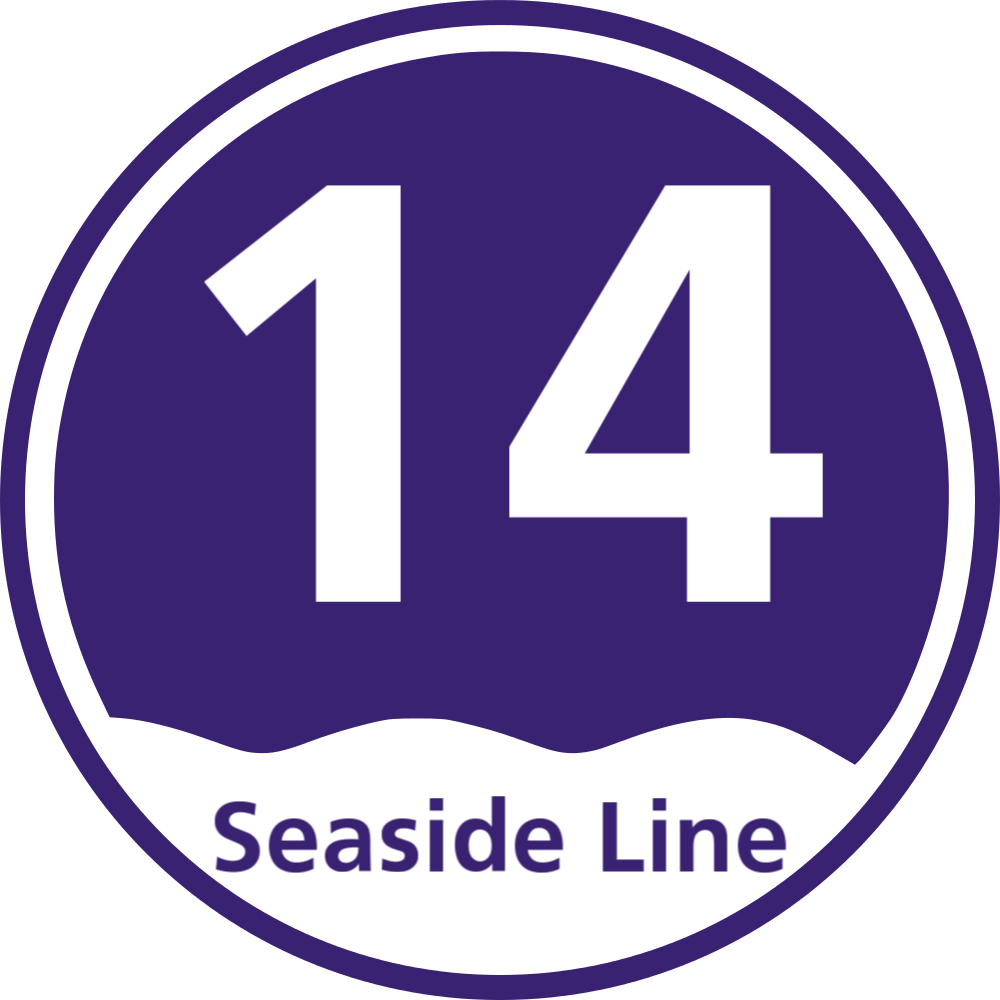
KK50 Kanazawa-hakkei Station 金沢八景駅

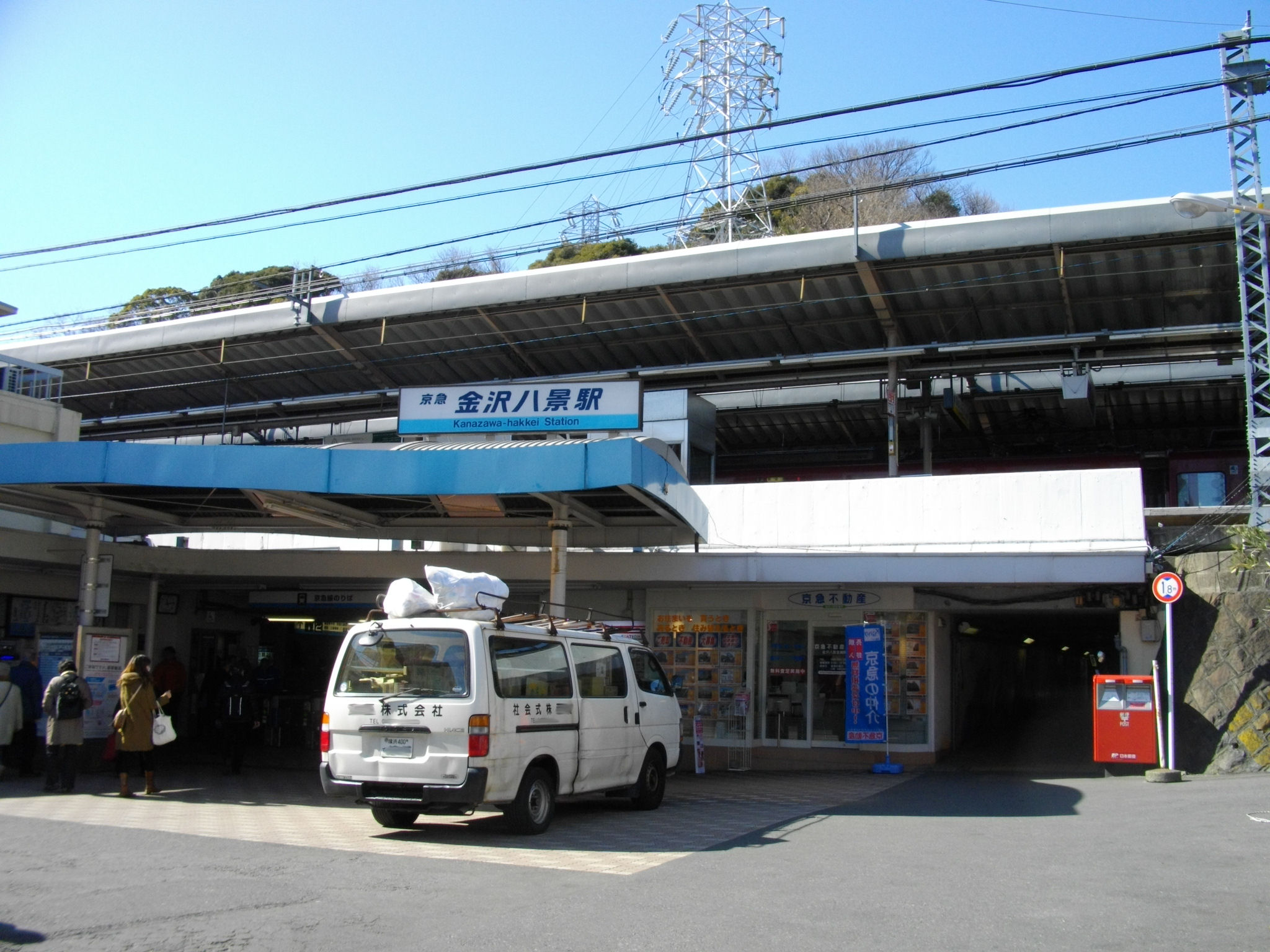
- The station entrance in February 2012

General information
- Location: 15-1 Seto, Kanazawa-ku, Yokohama-shi, Kanagawa-ken; Japan
- Operator: ■ Keikyu; Yokohama Seaside Line
- Lines: Keikyu Main Line; Keikyu Zushi Line; Kanazawa Seaside Line
- Connections: Bus stop

Other information
- Station code: KK50

History
- Opened: 1 April 1930

Passengers
- FY2022: 54,113 (Keikyu) daily

Services
| Preceding station | Keikyu | Following station |
|---|---|---|
Morning Wing does not stop here
| Yokosuka-chūō KK59 towards Misakiguchi | Evening Wing | Kanazawa-bunko One-way operation |
| Yokosuka-chūō KK59 towards Horinouchi | Main Line Limited Express (Kaitoku) | Kanazawa-bunko KK49 towards Sengakuji |
| Oppama KK54 towards Uraga | Main Line Limited Express (Tokkyū) | Kanazawa-bunko KK49 towards Sengakuji |
| through to Zushi Line Line | Main Line Express | Kanazawa-bunko KK49 towards Keikyū Kamata |
| Oppama KK54 towards Uraga | Main Line Local | Kanazawa-bunko KK49 towards Shinagawa |
| Mutsuura KK51 towards Zushi·Hayama | Zushi Line Limited Express (Tokkyū) Express Local | through to Main Line Line |
| Preceding station | Yokohama Seaside Line | Following station |
| Terminus | Kanazawa Seaside Line | Nojimakōen toward Shin-Sugita |
Location
- Location within Kanagawa Prefecture

Kanazawa-hakkei Station (金沢八景駅, Kanazawa-hakkei-eki) is a junction railway station in Kanazawa-ku, Yokohama, Kanagawa Prefecture, Japan, operated by the private railway operator Keikyu.

== Lines ==
Kanazawa-hakkei Station is served by the Keikyū Main Line and is located 40.9 kilometers from the official starting point of the line at Shinagawa Station, in Tokyo. It is also a terminal station for both the Keikyū Zushi Line and the Kanazawa Seaside Line, with the Kanazawa Seaside Line station located approximately 150 m to the east of the Keikyū station.

== Station layout ==
Kanazawa-hakkei Station is an elevated station with two island platforms serving four tracks. Track 4 is dual-gauge (1,067 mm narrow gauge and 1,435 mm standard gauge) to allow narrow-gauge rolling stock to be moved at night from the nearby J-TREC factory to JR tracks via Zushi Station.

=== Keikyū platforms ===
| 1 | ■ Keikyū Main Line | for Yokosuka-chūō, Uraga, and Misakiguchi |
| 2 | ■ Keikyū Main Line | for Yokosuka-chūō, Uraga, and Misakiguchi |
| 2 | ■ Keikyū Zushi Line | for Zushi·Hayama |
| 3 | ■ Keikyū Main Line | for Yokohama, Shinagawa, Haneda Airport, and Oshiage |
| 4 | ■ Keikyū Main Line | for Yokohama, Shinagawa, Haneda Airport, and Oshiage |
| 4 | ■ Keikyū Zushi Line | for Zushi·Hayama |

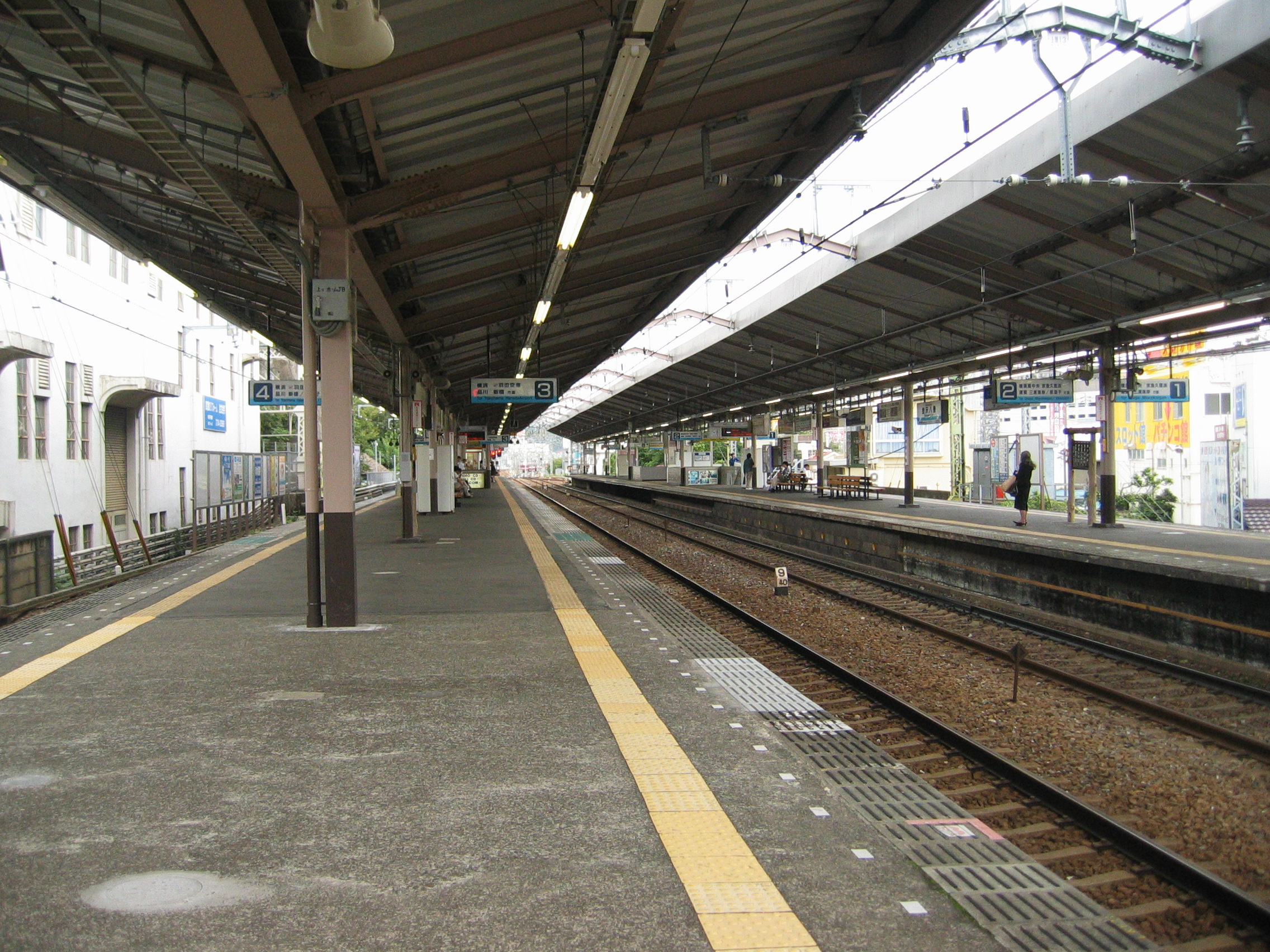
The platforms in October 2007

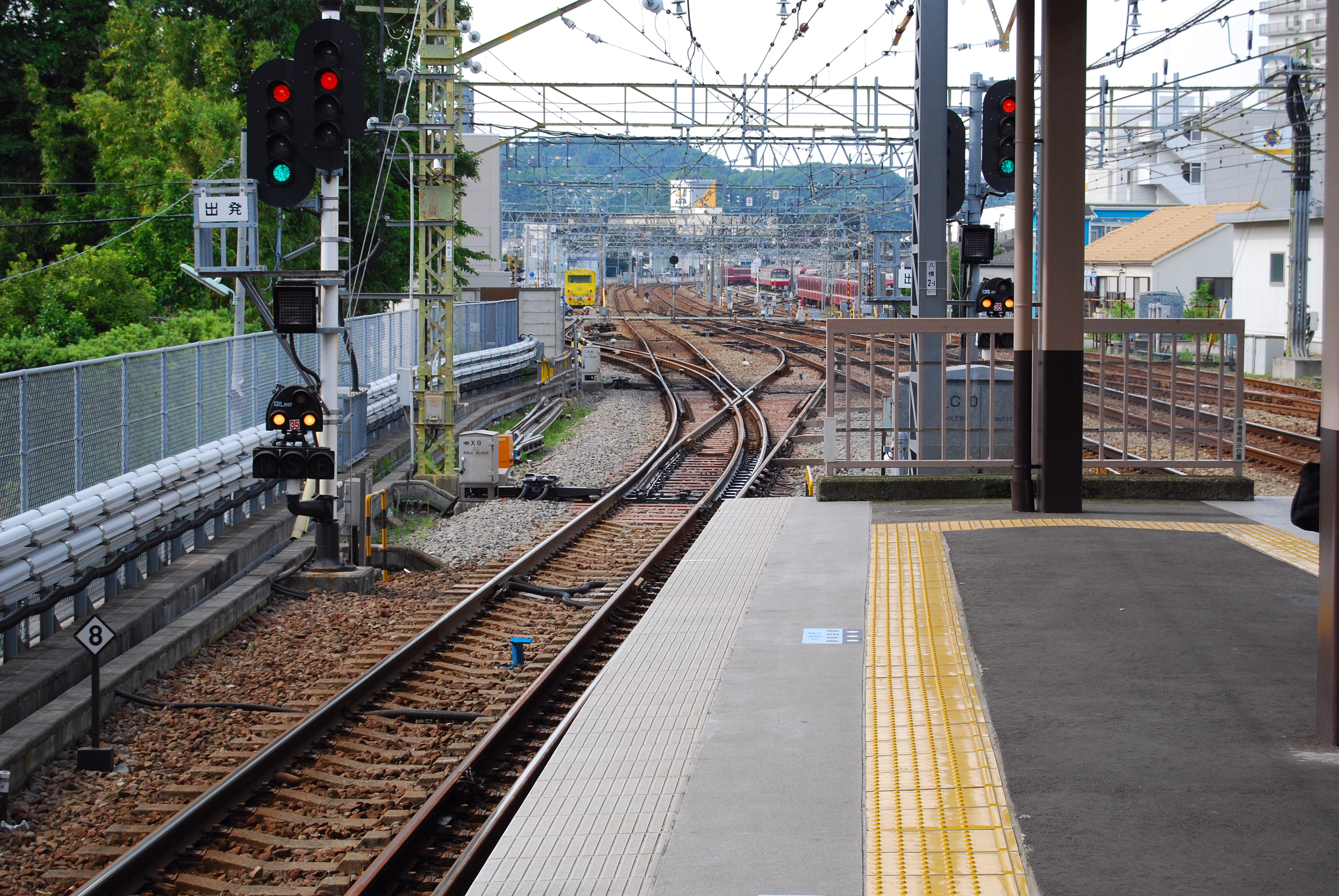
The view from the north end of platform 3/4, with the dual-gauge track from the J-TREC factory visible on the left, June 2010

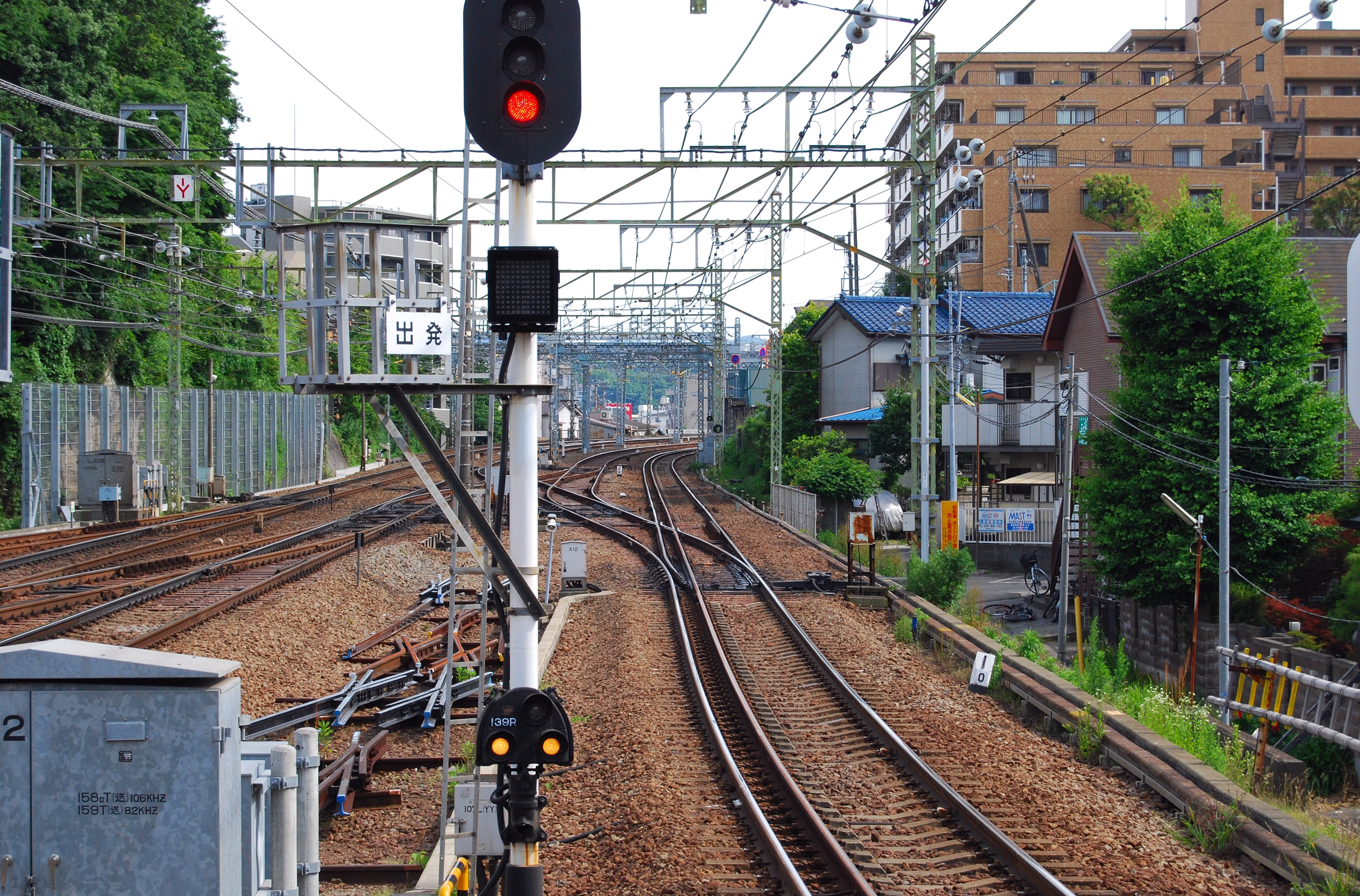
The view from the south end of platform 3/4, with the dual-gauge track to Jinmuji Station visible on the right, June 2010

=== Kanazawa Seaside Line platforms ===
The Kanazawa Seaside Line station is located south of the Keikyū station, and is an elevated single track, single side platform station for bi-directional traffic. The Kanazawa Seaside Line station is a temporary station, with construction connecting the Seaside Line to the Keikyū station beginning in early 2016. On 26 January 2019, the new entrance to the Keikyu side opened. The old entrance on the Keikyu side was made redundant and it is not possible to use the entrance because the stairs leading up to the platforms were blocked.

| 1/2 | ■ Kanazawa Seaside Line | for Shin-Sugita |

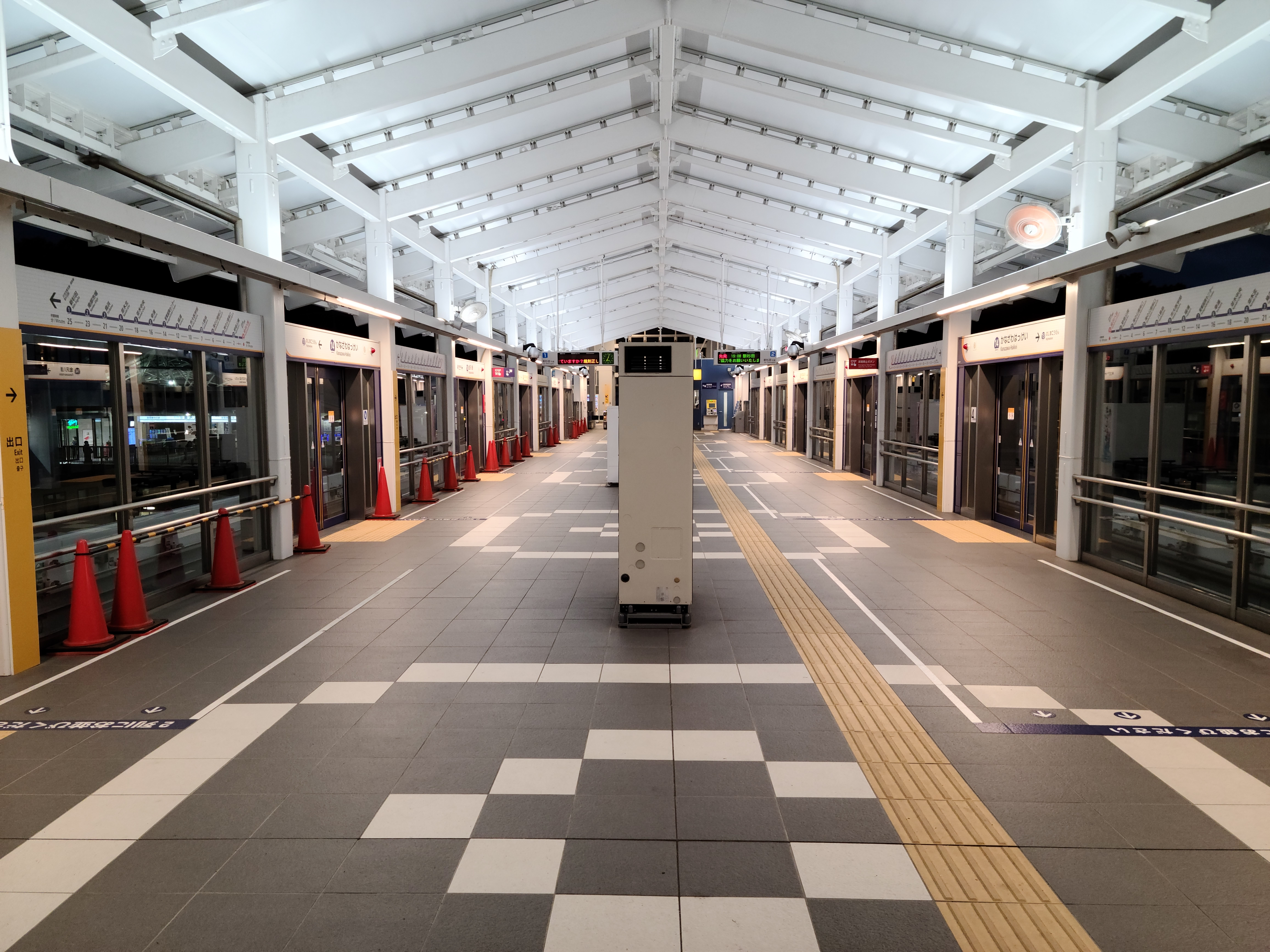
Kanazawa-hakkei Station Kanazawa Seaside Line platform in August 2020

== History ==
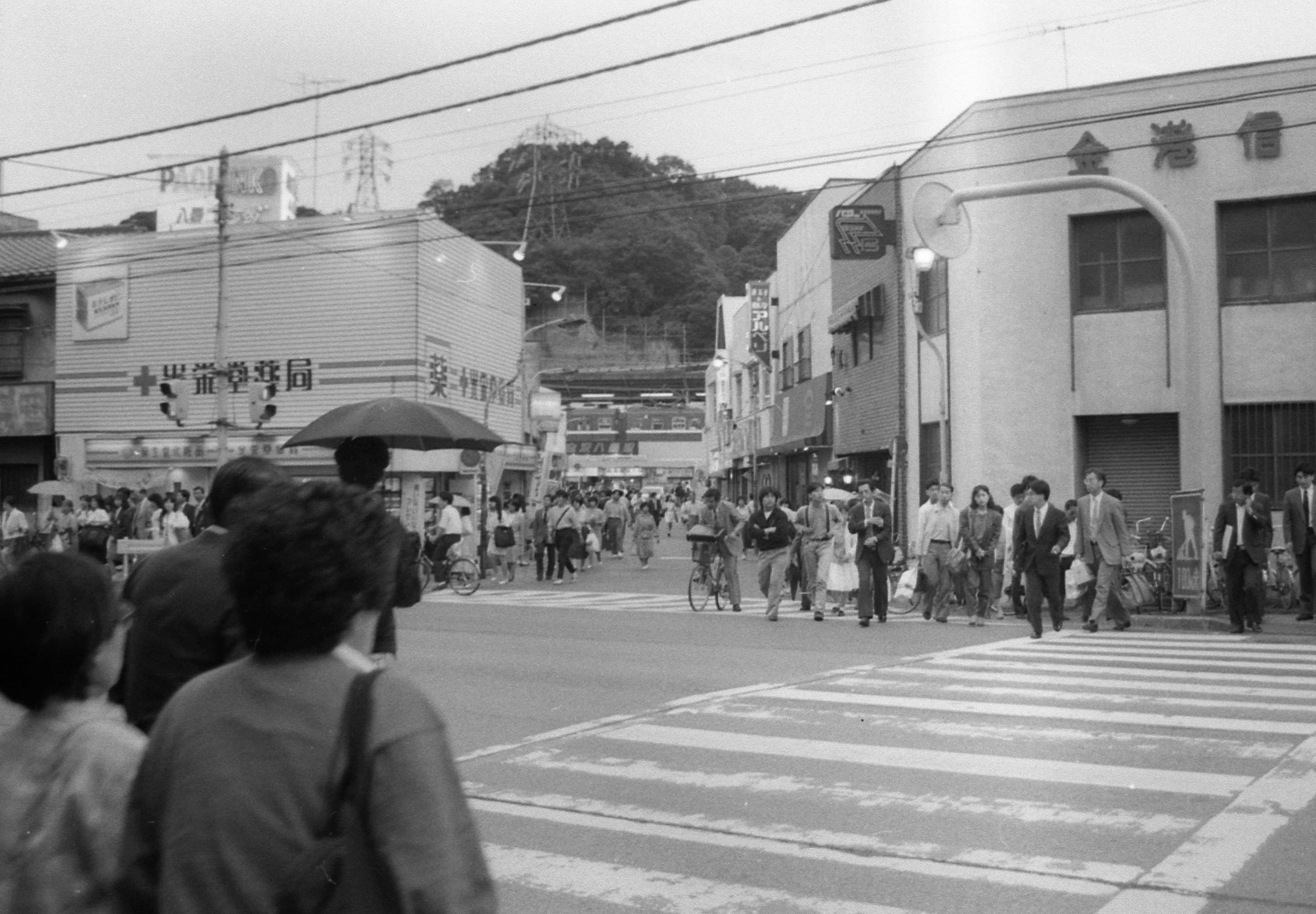
The area near the station in April 1988

Kanazawa-hakkei Station was opened on April 1, 1930, as a station on the Shonan Electric Railway, which merged with the Keihin Electric Railway in 1941. The station was rebuilt in July 1987.

The facilities for the Kanazawa Seaside Line opened on 5 July 1989, coinciding with the start of service between this station and Shin-Sugita Station.

The name Kanazawa Hakkei ("Eight Views of Kanazawa") is taken from the name of a series of ukiyo-e woodblock prints of eight places in the area, which were made between 1835 and 1836, by Andō Hiroshige.

Since 2010, all Limited Express (Kaitoku) trains stop at this station.

Keikyū introduced station numbering to its stations on 21 October 2010; Kanazawa-hakkei Station was assigned station number KK50.

== See also ==
- List of railway stations in Japan
