= Negishi =

Negishi (根岸) is a Japanese surname and place name. It may refer to:

- Ei-ichi Negishi, a Japanese chemist who was awarded the 2010 Nobel Prize in Chemistry
  - Negishi coupling, a chemical reaction discovered by Ei-ichi Negishi in 1977
- Kichitaro Negishi, a Japanese film director
- Negishi, a neighborhood of Taitō, formerly a village
- Negishi, a neighborhood of Isogo-ku, Yokohama, formerly a village
  - Negishi Line, a railway line that runs between Yokohama and Ōfuna stations
  - Negishi Station (Kanagawa)
- Negishi Station (Fukushima)
- Negishi (My-HiME Destiny), a fictional character in the light novel series My-HiME Destiny
- Takashi Negishi, Japanese economist who extended general equilibrium modeling for competition and welfare
  - Negishi welfare weights, a weight function developed by Takashi Negishi in 1972 that freezes income distributions
- Negishi Shingorō, a Japanese martial artist
  - Negishi-ryū, Japanese shurikenjutsu school founded by Negishi Shōrei

== See also ==
- Negishi Station (disambiguation)
