= Kannai Station =

Railway and metro station in Yokohama, Japan

JK10 B17 Kannai Station 関内駅
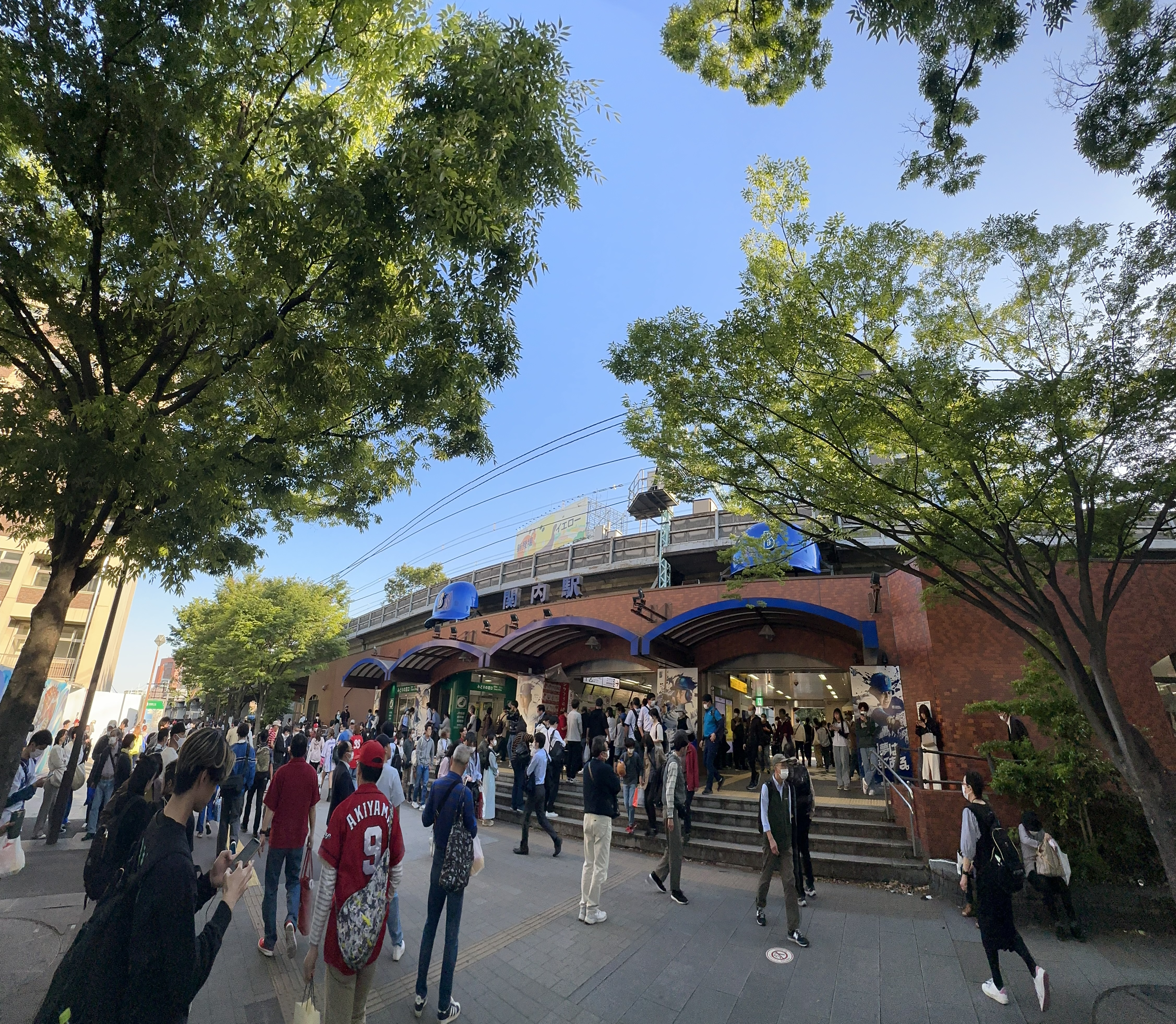
- Kannai Station south exit, May 2023

General information
- Location: 1-1 Minato-cho, Naka-ku, Yokohama-shi, Kanagawa-ken 231-0048; Japan
- Coordinates: 35°26′36″N 139°38′14″E
- Operator: JR East; Yokohama City Transportation Bureau
- Lines: Negishi Line; Blue Line
- Platforms: 2 side platforms + 2 island platforms
- Tracks: 6
- Connections: Bus stop

Other information
- Status: Staffed (Midori no Madoguchi)
- Station code: JK10, B17
- Website: Official website

History
- Opened: May 9, 1964

Passengers
- FY2019: 55,299 (JR); 23,299 (Blue Line) daily

Services
Preceding station	JR East	Following station
Ishikawachō JK09 towards Ōfuna	Negishi Line	Sakuragichō JK11 towards Yokohama
Ishikawachō JK09 towards Ōfuna	Yokohama Line Local	Sakuragichō JK11 towards Hachiōji
Preceding station	Yokohama Municipal Subway	Following station
Kamiōoka B11 towards Shonandai	Blue Line Rapid	Sakuragichō B18 towards Azamino
Isezaki-chōjamachi B16 towards Shonandai	Blue Line Local	Sakuragichō B18 towards Azamino
Location
- Location within Yokohama Location within Kanagawa Prefecture Location within Japan

Kannai Station (関内駅, Kannai-eki) is an interchange passenger railway station located in Naka-ku, Yokohama, Japan, operated by East Japan Railway Company (JR East) and the Yokohama Municipal Subway.

== Lines ==
Kannai Station is served by the Negishi Line from Yokohama to Ōfuna in Kanagawa Prefecture. with through services inter-running to and from the Keihin-Tōhoku Line and also the Yokohama Line. It is 3.0 kilometers from the terminus of the Negishi line at Yokohama, and 62.1 kilometers from the northern terminus of the Keihin-Tōhoku Line at Ōmiya. It is also served by the underground Yokohama Subway Blue Line, and is 19.7 km from the terminus of the Blue Line at Shōnandai.

== Station layout ==
JR Kannai Station is an elevated station with two opposed side platforms, connected to the station building below by underpasses. The Yokohama Municipal Subway Blue Line Station is located on the 2nd & 3rd underground floors, north of the main station. It has two island platforms serving three tracks. Platform 1 is not used due to the curvature of the line, and there is no corresponding track. Platforms 2 and 4 are in use, and Platform 3 is not in use for embarking or disembarking passengers but only for storage.

=== JR Platforms ===
1	Negishi Line	for Isogo and Ōfuna
2	Negishi Line-Keihin-Tohoku Line	for Yokohama, Tokyo, and Ōmiya
2	Yokohama Line	for Yokohama, Nagatsuta, Machida, and Hachiōji

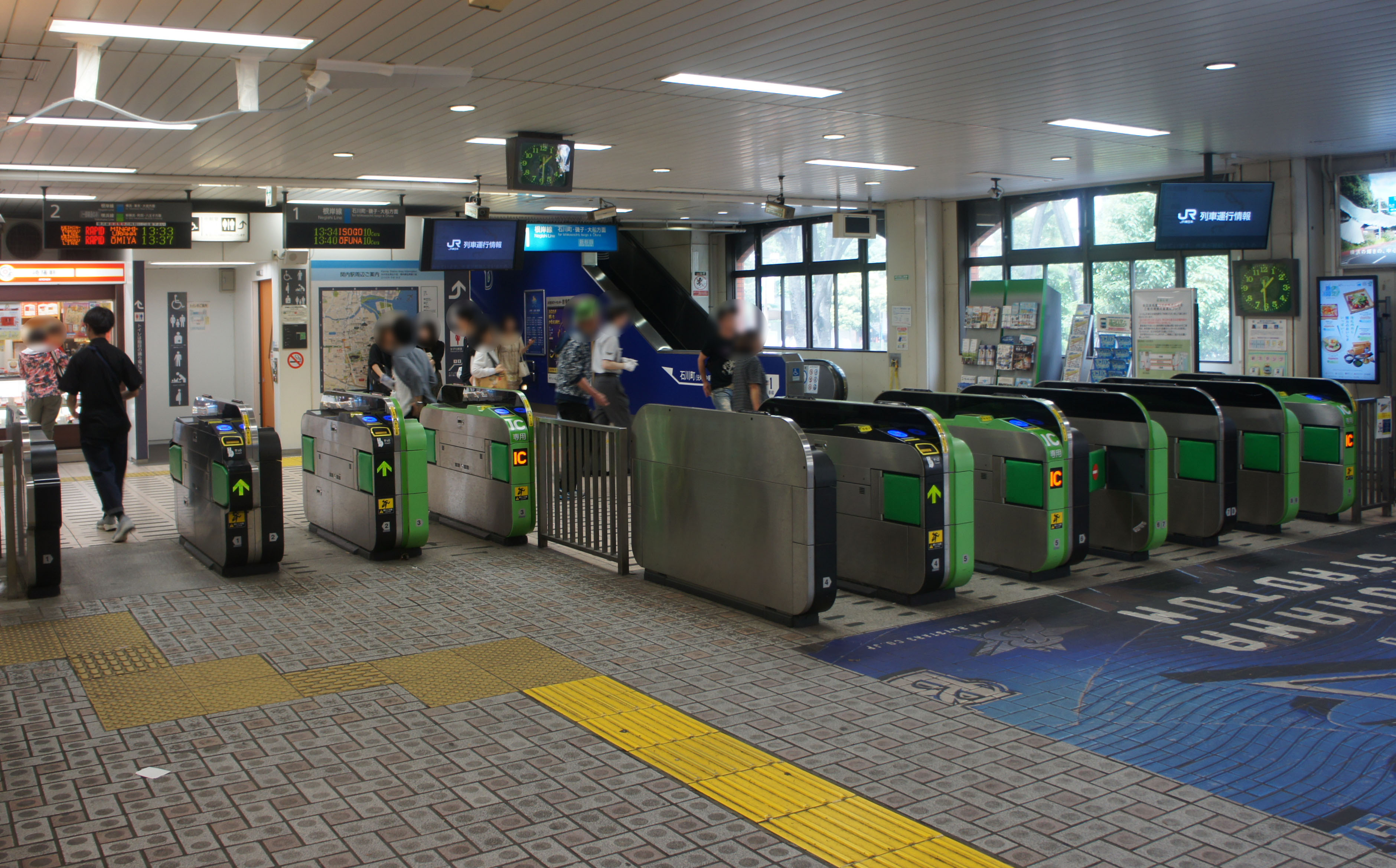
Ticket gates

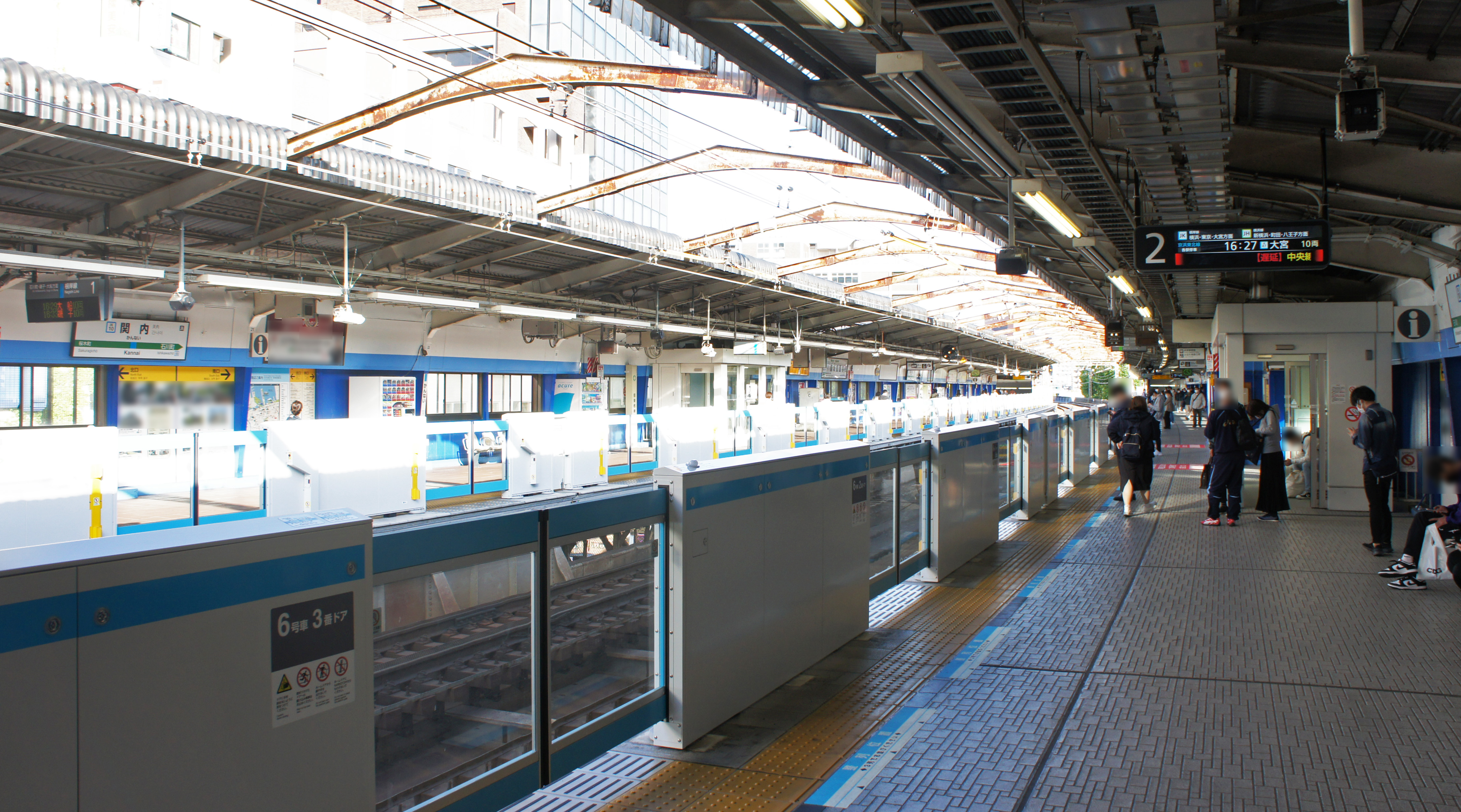
Platform

=== Blue Line Platforms ===
2	Blue Line	for Kamiōoka, Totsuka, and Shōnandai
3	Blue Line	Not in use
4	Blue Line	for Yokohama, Shin-Yokohama, and Azamino

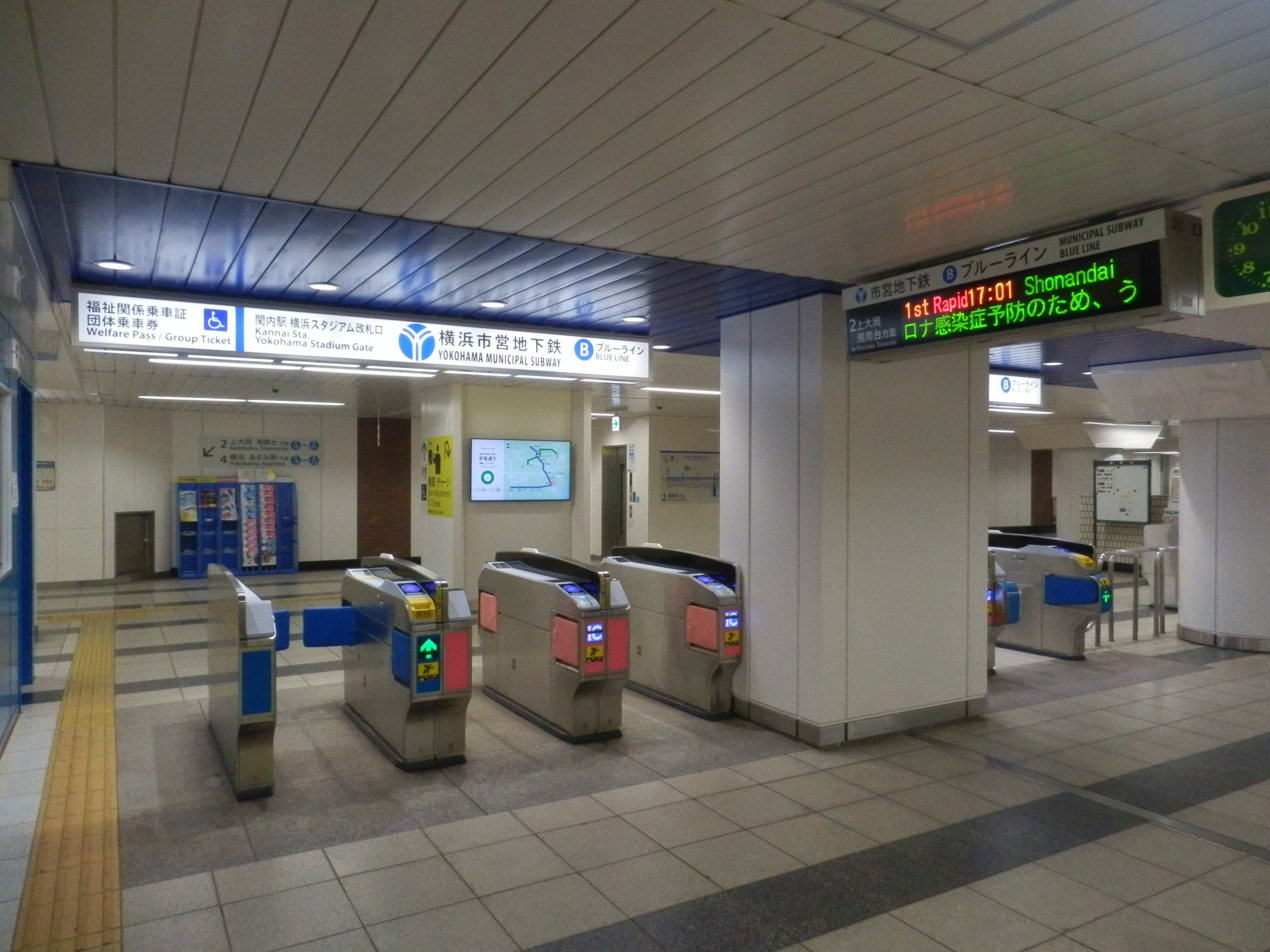
Ticket gates

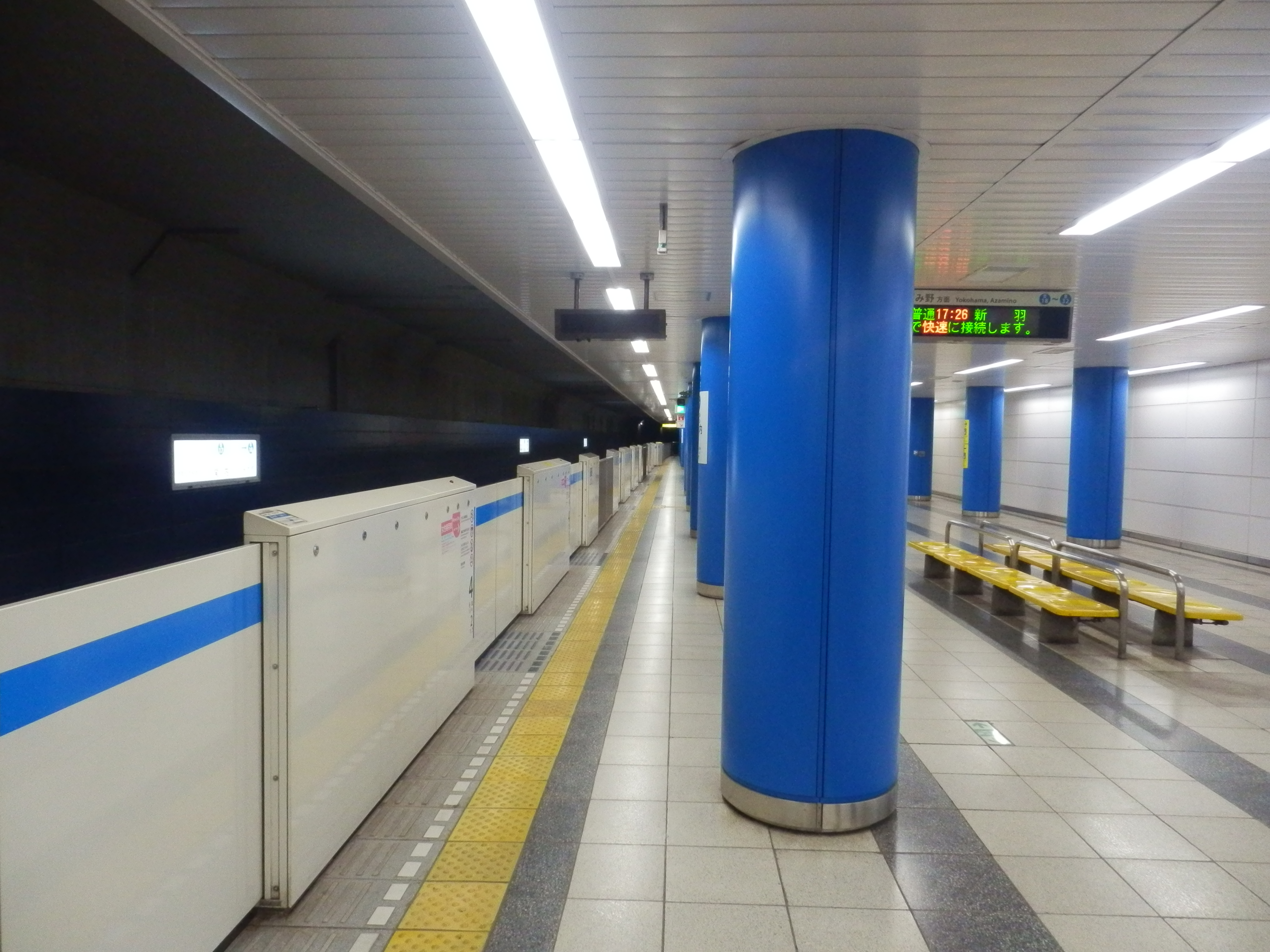
Platform

== History ==
Kannai Station was opened on 9 May 1964 as a station on the Japanese National Railways (JNR). The Yokohama Municipal Subway began operations to Kannai Station from September 4, 1976. The station was absorbed into the JR East network upon the privatization of the JNR in 1987.

== Passenger statistics ==
In fiscal 2019, an average of 55,299 passengers daily boarded the JR line from this station. During the same period, an additional 23,299 passengers (boarding passengers only) made use of this station for the Blue Line.

The daily average passenger figures (boarding passengers only) for previous years are as shown below.

Fiscal year	JR East	Blue Line
2005	56,273	20,274
2010	55,270	22,184
2015	54,975	23,208

== Surrounding area ==
- Yokohama City Hall
- Yokohama Cultural Gymnasium
- Yokohama Park
- Yokohama Stadium
- Yokohama Media Business Center
  - Kanagawa Shimbun
  - TV Kanagawa headquarters
- Isezakichō Shopping Street
- Yokohama Chinatown

== See also ==
- List of railway stations in Japan
