= Ishikawachō Station =

Railway station in Yokohama, Japan

JK09 Ishikawachō Station 'Motomachi-Chūkagai' 石川町<元町・中華街>駅
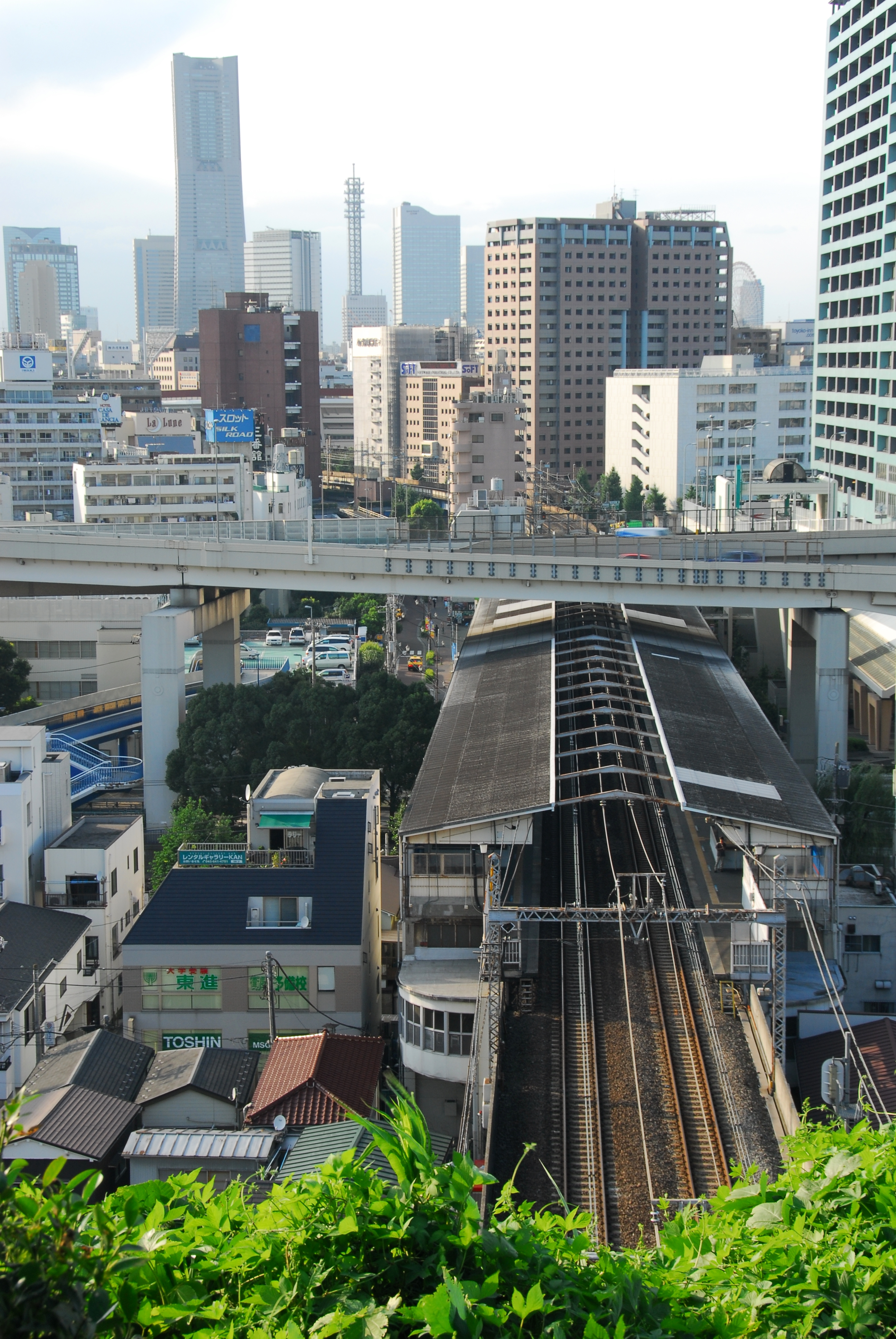
- Ishikawachō Station in July 2006

General information
- Location: 2 Ishikawachō, Naka-ku, Yokohama-shi, Kanagawa-ken v Japan
- Coordinates: 35°26′18″N 139°38′35″E
- Operator: JR East
- Line: Negishi Line
- Distance: 3.8 km from Yokohama
- Platforms: 2 side platforms
- Tracks: 2

Construction
- Structure type: Elevated

Other information
- Status: Staffed ( "Midori no Madoguchi" )
- Station code: JK-09
- Website: Official website

History
- Opened: 19 May 1964

Passengers
- FY2019: 23,377 daily

Services
Preceding station	JR East	Following station
Yamate JK08 towards Ōfuna	Negishi Line	Kannai JK10 towards Yokohama
Yamate JK08 towards Ōfuna	Yokohama Line Local	Kannai JK10 towards Hachiōji
Location
- Location within Kanagawa Prefecture Location within Japan

Platforms, 2026

Ishikawachō Station (石川町駅, Ishikawachō-eki) is a passenger railway station located in Naka-ku, Yokohama, Japan, operated by East Japan Railway Company (JR East).

== Lines ==
Ishikawachō Station is served by the Negishi Line, which is linked with the Keihin-Tōhoku Line from Yokohama to Ōmiya, and is also served by some Yokohama Line through-running services. The station is 3.8 km from the starting point of the Negishi Line at Yokohama and 62.9 km from the starting point of the Keihin-Tōhoku Line at Ōmiya.

== Station layout ==
Ishikawachō Station has two elevated opposed side platforms serving two tracks with the station building underneath. The station has a "Midori no Madoguchi" staffed ticket office.

=== Platforms ===
1	Negishi Line	for Isogo and Ōfuna
2	Negishi Line-Keihin-Tohoku Line	for Yokohama, Tokyo, and Ōmiya
2	Yokohama Line	for Yokohama, Nagatsuta, Machida, and Hachiōji

== History ==
Ishikawachō Station opened on May 19, 1964, as a station on the Japanese National Railways (JNR). The station was absorbed into the JR East network upon the privatization of JNR on 1 April 1987.

Due to confusion generated from which station on the Negishi Line was closest to Motomachi and the local Chinatown, the station signage and the visual train announcements were changed on September 15, 2016 to read "Ishikawachō 'Motomachi-Chūkagai' Station" (石川町〈元町・中華街〉駅, Ishikawachō-Motomachi-Chūkagai-eki). Despite the station's now similar name to Motomachi-Chūkagai Station on the Minato Mirai Line, the two stations are located relatively far from each other.

== Passenger statistics ==
In fiscal 2019, the station was used by an average of 23,377 passengers daily (boarding passengers only).

The passenger figures (boarding passengers only) for previous years are as shown below.

Fiscal year	Daily average
2000	41,153
2005	35,725
2010	34,286
2015	32,639

== Surrounding area ==
The station is located near the Motomachi and Yokohama Chinatown tourist areas in Yokohama. However, Motomachi-Chūkagai Station on the Minato Mirai Line, which opened in 2004, is closer to those locations.

== See also ==
- List of railway stations in Japan
