= Yōkōdai Station =

Railway station in Yokohama, Japan

JK04 Yōkōdai Station 洋光台
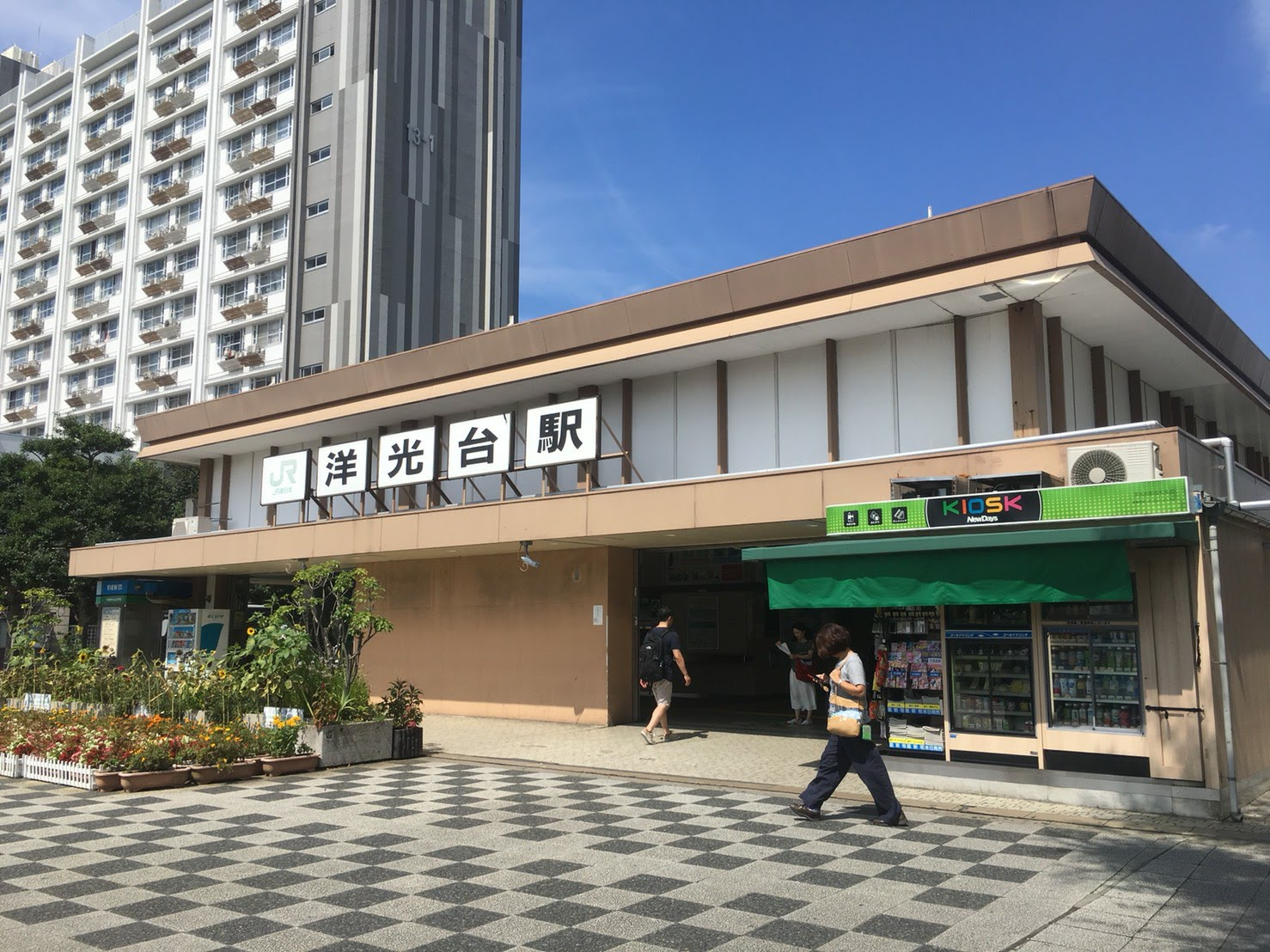
- Yōkōdai Station, 2018

General information
- Location: Yōkōdai 3-14-1, Isogo-ku, Yokohama-shi, Kanagawa-ken 235-0045; Japan
- Coordinates: 35°22′43.3″N 139°35′47.4″E
- Operator: JR East
- Line: Negishi Line
- Distance: 14.1 km from Yokohama
- Platforms: 1 island platform

Other information
- Status: Staffed
- Station code: JK04
- Website: Official website

History
- Opened: 17 March 1970

Passengers
- FY2019: 20,064 daily

Services
Preceding station	JR East	Following station
Kōnandai JK03 towards Ōfuna	Negishi Line	Shin-Sugita JK05 towards Yokohama
Kōnandai JK03 towards Ōfuna	Yokohama Line Local	Shin-Sugita JK05 towards Hachiōji
Location
- Location within Kanagawa Prefecture Location within Japan

Yōkōdai Station (洋光台駅, Yōkōdai-eki) is a passenger railway station located in Isogo-ku, Yokohama, Kanagawa Prefecture, Japan, operated by the East Japan Railway Company (JR East).

== Lines ==
Yōkōdai Station is served by the Negishi Line from Yokohama to Ōfuna in Kanagawa Prefecture. with through services inter-running to and from the Keihin-Tōhoku Line and also the Yokohama Line. It is 14.1 kilometers from the terminus of the Negishi line at Yokohama, and 73.2 kilometers from the northern terminus of the Keihin-Tōhoku Line at Ōmiya.

== Station layout ==
The station consists of one island platform serving two tracks. The platform is connected to the station building by an underpass. The station is staffed.

=== Platforms ===
1	Negishi Line	for Kōnandai, Hongōdai and Ōfuna
2	Negishi Line-Keihin-Tohoku Line	for Yokohama, Tokyo, and Ōmiya
2	Yokohama Line	for Yokohama, Nagatsuta, Machida, and Hachiōji

== History ==
The area around Yōkōdai Station was formerly a small rural pocket within central Yokohama. It was developed into a large housing district in the early 1970s. The Japan National Railways (JNR) Keihin-Tōhoku Line was extended from its former terminus at Isogo Station, and Yōkōdai Station was opened on 17 March 1970. The line was further extended to Ōfuna Station in 1973. The station came under the management of JR East on April 1, 1987 after the privatization of the JNR.

== Passenger statistics ==
In fiscal 2019, the station was used by an average of 20,064 passengers daily (boarding passengers only).

The passenger figures (boarding passengers only) for previous years are as shown below.

Fiscal year	daily average
2005	21,959
2010	21,304
2015	20,780

== Surrounding area ==
- Yokohama Science Center, a municipal science museum for children, is located near the station.
- Kanagawa Prefectural Isogo High School
- Kanagawa Prefectural Yokohama Nanryo High School
- Kanagawa Prefectural Hitorizawa High School

== See also ==
- List of railway stations in Japan
