= Yamate Station =

Railway station in Yokohama, Japan

JK08 Yamate Station 山手駅
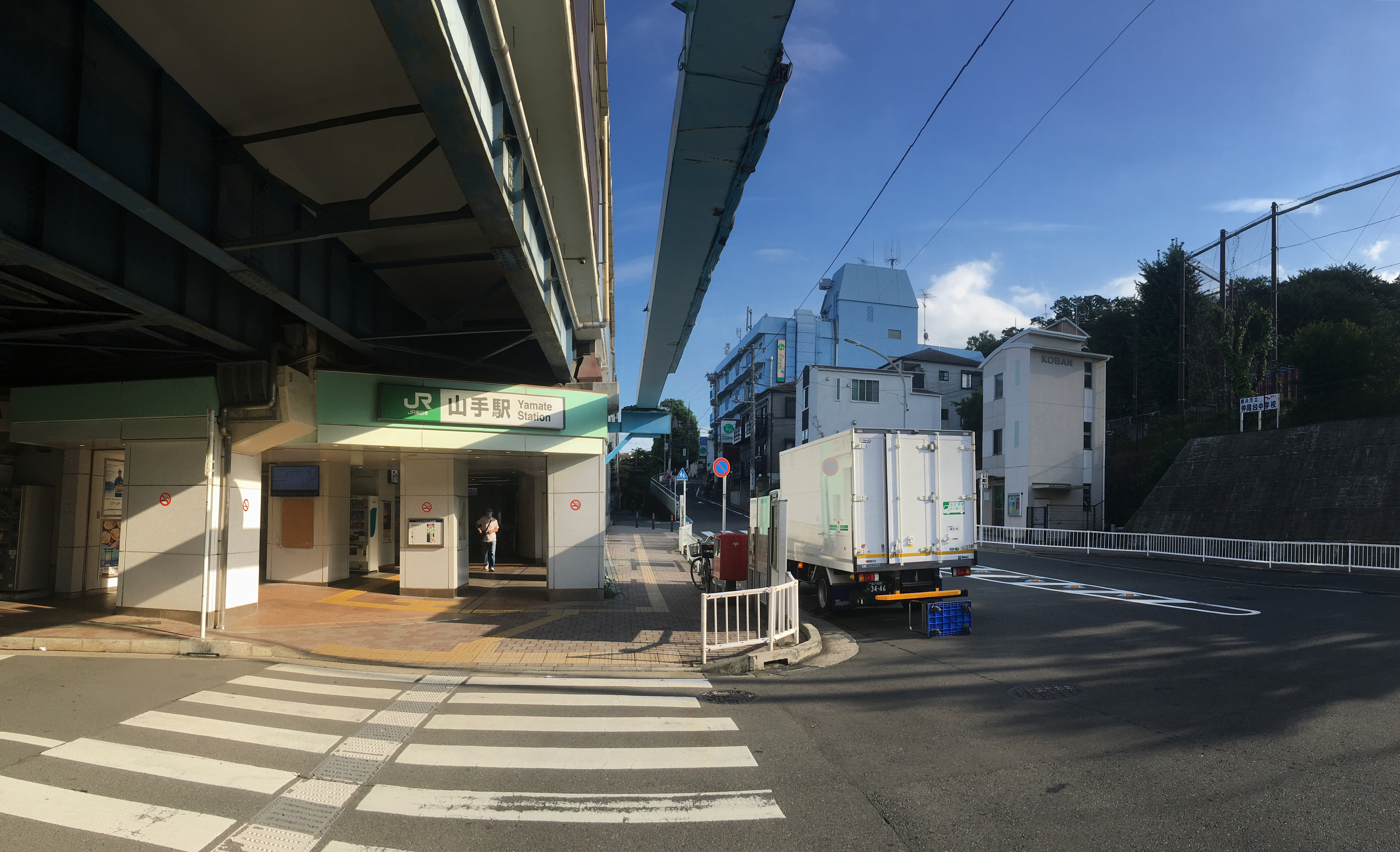
- Yamate Station building, 2021

General information
- Location: Yamato-cho 2-52, Naka-ku, Yokohama-shi, Kanagawa-ken 231-0845; Japan
- Coordinates: 35.427°N 139.646°E
- Operator: JR East
- Line: Negishi Line
- Distance: 5.0 km from Yokohama
- Platforms: 2 side platforms

Other information
- Status: Staffed
- Station code: JK08
- Website: Official website

History
- Opened: May 9, 1964

Passengers
- FY2019: 17,545 daily

Services
| Preceding station | JR East | Following station |
|---|---|---|
| Negishi JK07 towards Ōfuna | Negishi Line | Ishikawachō JK09 towards Yokohama |
| Negishi JK07 towards Ōfuna | Yokohama Line Local | Ishikawachō JK09 towards Hachiōji |
Location
- Location within Kanagawa Prefecture Location within Japan

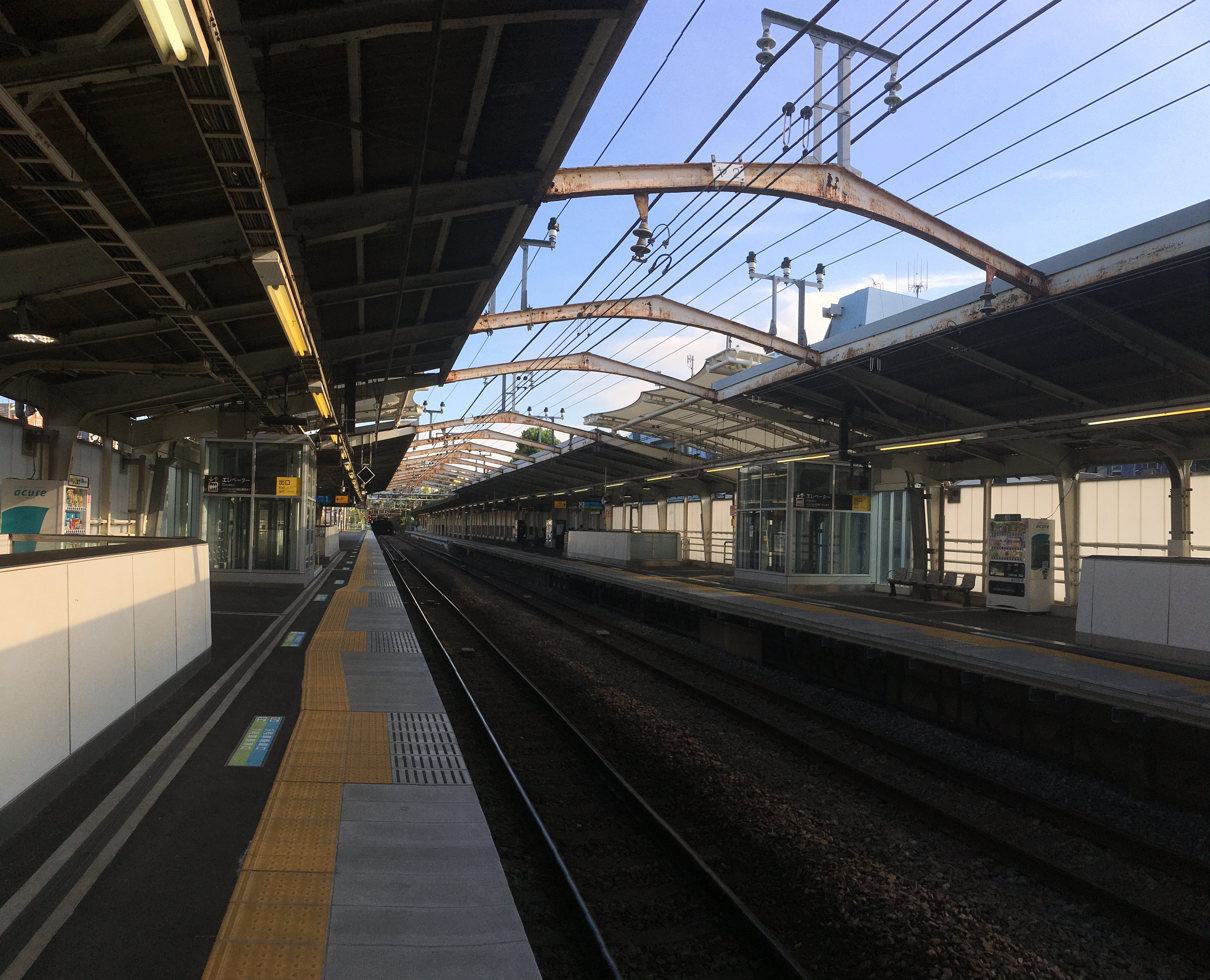
Station platforms

Yamate Station (山手駅, Yamate-eki) is a passenger railway station located in Naka-ku, Yokohama, Kanagawa Prefecture, Japan, operated by the East Japan Railway Company (JR East).

== Lines ==
Yamate Station is served by the Negishi Line from Yokohama to Ōfuna in Kanagawa Prefecture, with through services inter-running to and from the Keihin-Tōhoku Line and also the Yokohama Line. It is 5.0 kilometers from the terminus of the Negishi line at Yokohama, and 64.1 kilometers from the northern terminus of the Keihin-Tōhoku Line at Ōmiya.

== Station layout ==
The station consists of two elevated opposed side platforms serving two tracks, with the station building underneath. Both tracks are utilised by the Keihin-Tōhoku Line and Yokohama Line. The station is staffed.

=== Platforms ===
| 1 | Negishi Line | for Isogo and Ōfuna |
| 2 | Negishi Line-Keihin-Tohoku Line | for Yokohama, Tokyo, and Ōmiya |
| 2 | Yokohama Line | for Yokohama, Nagatsuta, Machida, and Hachiōji |

== History ==
Yamate Station was opened on May 9, 1964. The station was absorbed into the JR East network upon the privatization of the Japan National Railways (JNR) in 1987.

== Passenger statistics ==
In fiscal 2019, the station was used by an average of 17,545 passengers daily (boarding passengers only).

The passenger figures (boarding passengers only) for previous years are as shown below.

| Fiscal year | daily average |
|---|---|
| 2005 | 16,509 |
| 2010 | 17,118 |
| 2015 | 17,193 |

== Surrounding area ==
- Negishi Forest Park / Equine Museum
- Yokohama Foreign General Cemetery
- Yamate Park
- Yokohama City Tateno Elementary School
- Yokohama City Nakaodai Junior High School
- Yokohama National University
- Yokohama International School
- Seiko Gakuin Junior and Senior High School

== See also ==
- List of railway stations in Japan
