= Negishi Line =

Railway line in Kanagawa prefecture, Japan

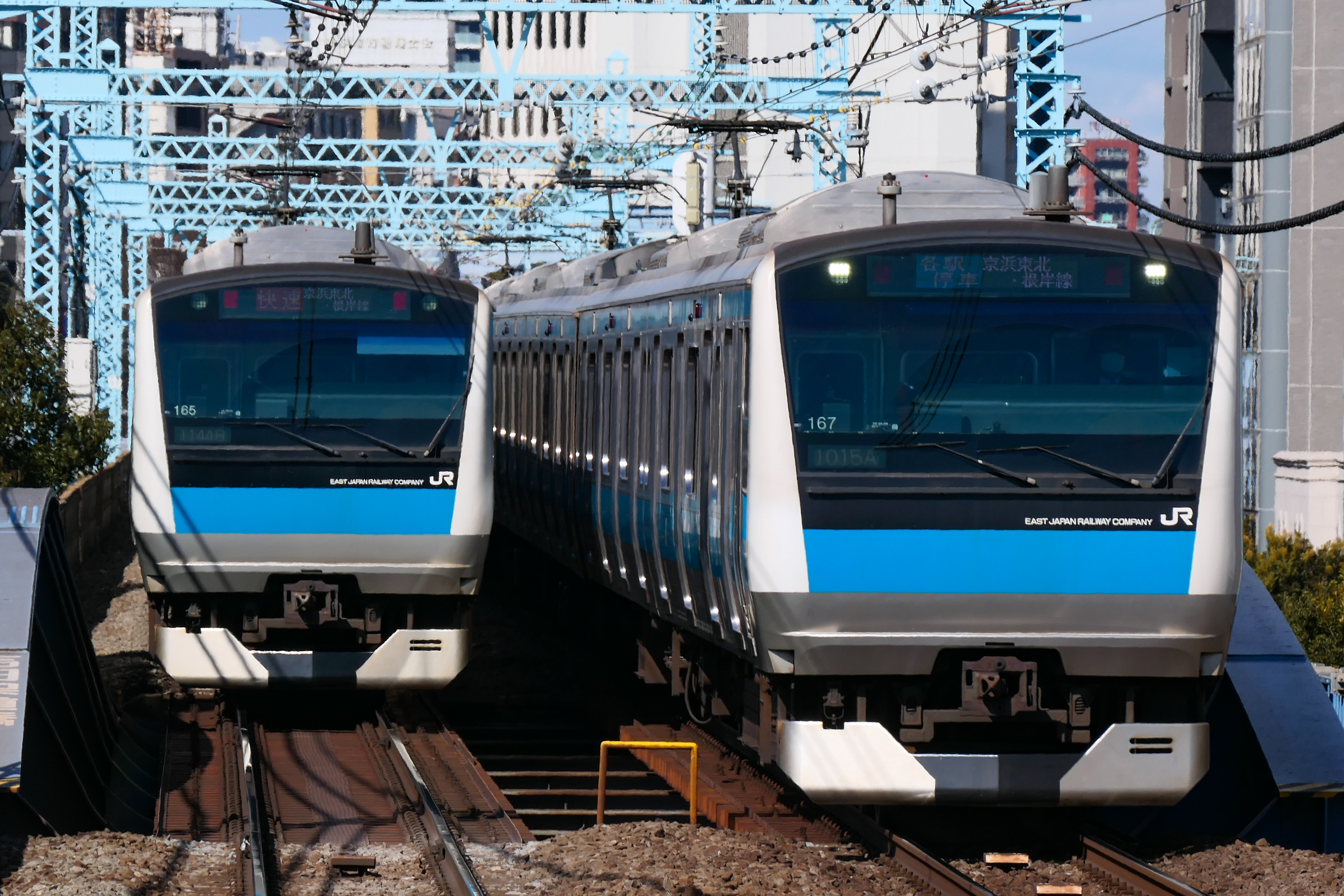
- A pair of Negishi Line E233 series trainsets in February 2022

Overview
- Owner: East Japan Railway Company (JR East)
- Locale: Kanagawa Prefecture
- Termini: Yokohama; Ofuna
- Stations: 12

Service
- Type: Heavy rail
- Operator(s): JR East, JR Freight

History
- Opened: June 12, 1872; 154 years ago

Technical
- Line length: 22.1 km (13.7 mi)
- Track gauge: 1,067 mm (3 ft 6 in)
- Electrification: Overhead line, 1,500 V DC
- Operating speed: 95 km/h (60 mph)
Route map

The Negishi Line (Japanese: 根岸線, romanized: Negishi-sen) is a Japanese railway line which connects Yokohama and Ōfuna stations. It is operated by East Japan Railway Company (JR East). Freight trains also operate on this line, and it is essential for the southern Keihin region.

The Negishi Line does not exist as an independent service. All trains operate a through service onto the Keihin-Tōhoku Line past Yokohama to Kamata, Tokyo, Minami-Urawa and Ōmiya. As a result, the entire service between Ōmiya and Ōfuna is typically referred to as the Keihin-Tōhoku—Negishi Line (Japanese: 京浜東北線・根岸線) on system maps and in-train station guides. Keihin-Tōhoku Line—Negishi Line trains are recognizable by their light blue stripe (the line's color on maps is also light blue).

Some Yokohama Line trains to/from Hachiōji or Hashimoto travel onto the Negishi line and terminate/originate at Sakuragicho, with a small number of AM & PM Peak services continuing to/from Isogo or Ofuna.

== Basic data ==
- Double-tracking: Entire line
- Railway signalling:
  - Yokohama – Ōfuna (Passenger services): Automatic Train Control, D-ATC
  - Sakuragichō – Ōfuna (Freight services): Automatic Signaling Block, ATS-P

== Services ==
All trains on the Negishi Line are local trains, stopping at all stations. Between approximately 09:30 & 14:30 trains display Rapid, as they omit some stops in Central Tokyo on the Keihin-Tohoku Line portion of the service.

During the daytime, trains operate every 10 minutes between Yokohama and Ofuna, and every 5-10 minutes between Yokohama and Isogo.

The Hamakaiji limited express service also formerly operated on the Negishi Line until the service ceased operating on January 3, 2019.

=== Freight services ===
Freight trains are a common sight on the Negishi Line. The following rail companies either link up to or use the Negishi Line for the purpose of transporting freight.

- Takashima Freight Line(Japanese: 高島貨物線) (Sakuragichō)
- Kanagawa Rinkai Railway (Negishi)
- Tōkaidō Freight Line (Hongōdai)

== Station list ==
- All stations are located in Kanagawa Prefecture.
- All trains stop at every station.

No.	Station	Distance in km (mi)				Transfers	Location
No.	Station	Between stations	from Yokohama	from Ōmiya	from Hachiōji	Transfers	Location
↑ Through-running to/from Ōmiya via the Keihin–Tōhoku Line or Hachiōji via the Yokohama Line ↑
	Yokohama 横浜	—N/a	0 (0)	59.1 (36.7)	44.4 (27.6)	Keihin–Tōhoku Line (through service); Tōkaidō Line (JT05); Shōnan–Shinjuku Line (JS13); Yokosuka Line (JO13); Tōkyū Tōyoko Line (TY21); Minatomirai Line (MM01); Keikyū Main Line (KK37); Sōtetsu Main Line (SO01); Blue Line (B20)	Nishi-ku, Yokohama
JK11	Sakuragichō 桜木町	2.0 (1.2)	2.0 (1.2)	61.1 (38.0)	46.4 (28.8)	Blue Line (B18)	Naka-ku, Yokohama
JK10	Kannai 関内	1.0 (0.62)	3.0 (1.9)	62.1 (38.6)	47.4 (29.5)	Blue Line (B17)	Naka-ku, Yokohama
JK09	Ishikawachō 石川町	0.8 (0.50)	3.8 (2.4)	62.9 (39.1)	48.2 (30.0)		Naka-ku, Yokohama
JK08	Yamate 山手	1.2 (0.75)	5.0 (3.1)	64.1 (39.8)	49.4 (30.7)		Naka-ku, Yokohama
JK07	Negishi 根岸	2.1 (1.3)	7.1 (4.4)	66.2 (41.1)	51.5 (32.0)		Isogo-ku, Yokohama
JK06	Isogo 磯子	2.4 (1.5)	9.5 (5.9)	68.6 (42.6)	53.9 (33.5)		Isogo-ku, Yokohama
JK05	Shin-Sugita 新杉田	1.6 (0.99)	11.1 (6.9)	70.2 (43.6)	55.5 (34.5)	Kanazawa Seaside Line (1); Keikyū Main Line (Sugita: KK46)	Isogo-ku, Yokohama
JK04	Yōkōdai 洋光台	3.0 (1.9)	14.1 (8.8)	73.2 (45.5)	58.5 (36.4)		Isogo-ku, Yokohama
JK03	Kōnandai 港南台	1.9 (1.2)	16.0 (9.9)	75.1 (46.7)	60.4 (37.5)		Kōnan-ku, Yokohama
JK02	Hongōdai 本郷台	2.5 (1.6)	18.5 (11.5)	77.6 (48.2)	62.9 (39.1)		Sakae-ku, Yokohama
	Ōfuna 大船	3.6 (2.2)	22.1 (13.7)	81.2 (50.5)	66.5 (41.3)	Tōkaidō Line (JT07); Yokosuka Line (JO09); Shōnan–Shinjuku Line (JS09); Shonan Monorail (SMR1)	Sakae-ku, Yokohama
	Ōfuna 大船	3.6 (2.2)	22.1 (13.7)	81.2 (50.5)	66.5 (41.3)	Tōkaidō Line (JT07); Yokosuka Line (JO09); Shōnan–Shinjuku Line (JS09); Shonan Monorail (SMR1)	Kamakura

== History ==
The oldest station on the line is Sakuragichō, which was opened by the Japanese Government Railways on June 12, 1872 (Note: July 5 according to the calendar that Japan used at the time) as the first railway terminal in Yokohama of the first railway line in Japan. The line was extended to Kōzu on July 11, 1887; trains had to reverse direction at Yokohama via a switchback to continue their journey. This was alleviated by a bypass line between Kanagawa and Hodogaya which opened on August 1, 1898. The branch was named the Tōkaidō Main Line Branch Line on October 12, 1909.

Takashimachō Station opened between Kanagawa and Yokohama on December 20, 1914, as the terminus of an electrified Keihin Line (the predecessor of today's Keihin-Tōhoku Line). On August 15, 1915, a new Yokohama Station opened, absorbing nearby Takashimachō and becoming the new terminus of the line. The old Yokohama station was renamed Sakuragichō and the Sakuragichō – Hodogaya bypass closed. Keihin Line service was extended to Sakuragichō on December 30, 1915, when freight service ceased on the branch.

The line was planned to be extended to Ōfuna, and in 1920 the Government Railways decided that the extension route would be parallel to the Ōoka River and then turn to Hodogaya. From Hodogaya to Ōfuna, additional tracks would be added to the existing Tōkaidō Main Line. However, this plan was scrapped after the Great Kantō earthquake of 1923. Later, the planned extension was revived with a completely different route: "The railway from Sakuragichō in Kanagawa Prefecture to Kita-Kamakura" was added to the list of railways to be built in the Railway Construction Act on March 31, 1937. This provision was the basis for the construction of the present-day Negishi Line.

Yokohama Station moved on October 15, 1928; between then and January 26, 1930, temporary platforms for the Keihin Line were provided on either side of the station.

On May 19, 1964, the line was extended to Isogo. The line was renamed the Negishi Line after one of the new stations. The Takashima freight line opened on June 1 that year and freight service returned to the line after a nearly 50-year absence. 103 series trains were introduced to the line in October 1965.

The line was extended from Isogo to Yōkōdai on March 17, 1970. The final section between Yōkōdai and Ōfuna opened on April 9, 1973; On October 1 that year, freight service commenced between Ōfuna and Isogo.

Freight services between Ōfuna and Isogo ceased on February 1, 1984; three days prior to this, the line adopted Automatic Train Control. On April 1, 1987, the Japanese National Railways were privatized, with ownership of the Negishi Line passing to JR East; JR Freight took over freight services on the line.

Some trains began operating through onto the Yokosuka Line on March 15, 2008.

=== Accidents ===
The Sakuragichō train fire occurred on April 24, 1951.

On May 20, 1970, a 103 series train derailed between Shin-Sugita and Yōkōdai, injuring two people.

== Rolling Stock ==
- E233-1000 series
- E233-6000 series (used on Yokohama Line inter-running services)

== Photo Gallery ==
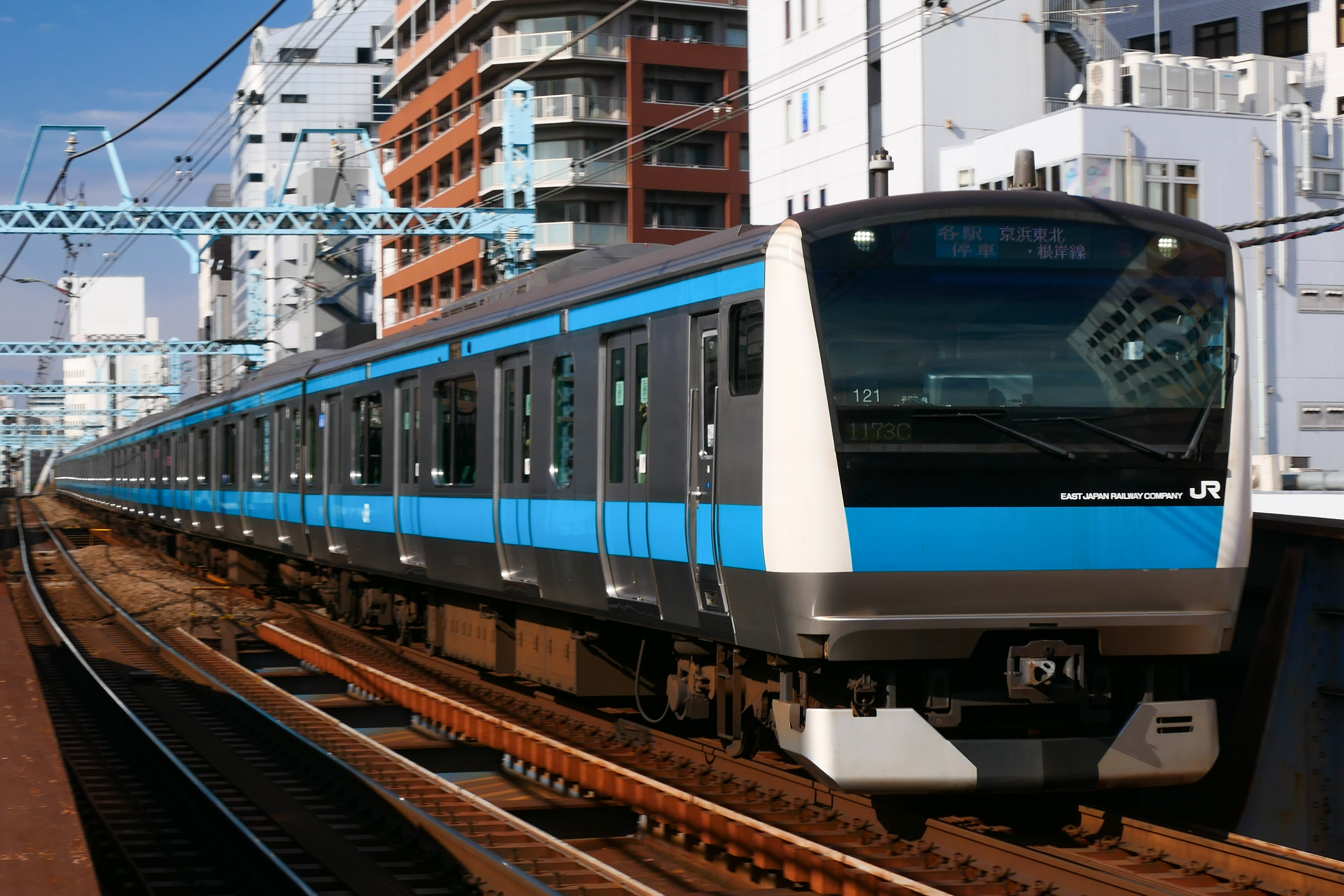
E233-1000 series train at Kannai Station. January 2023

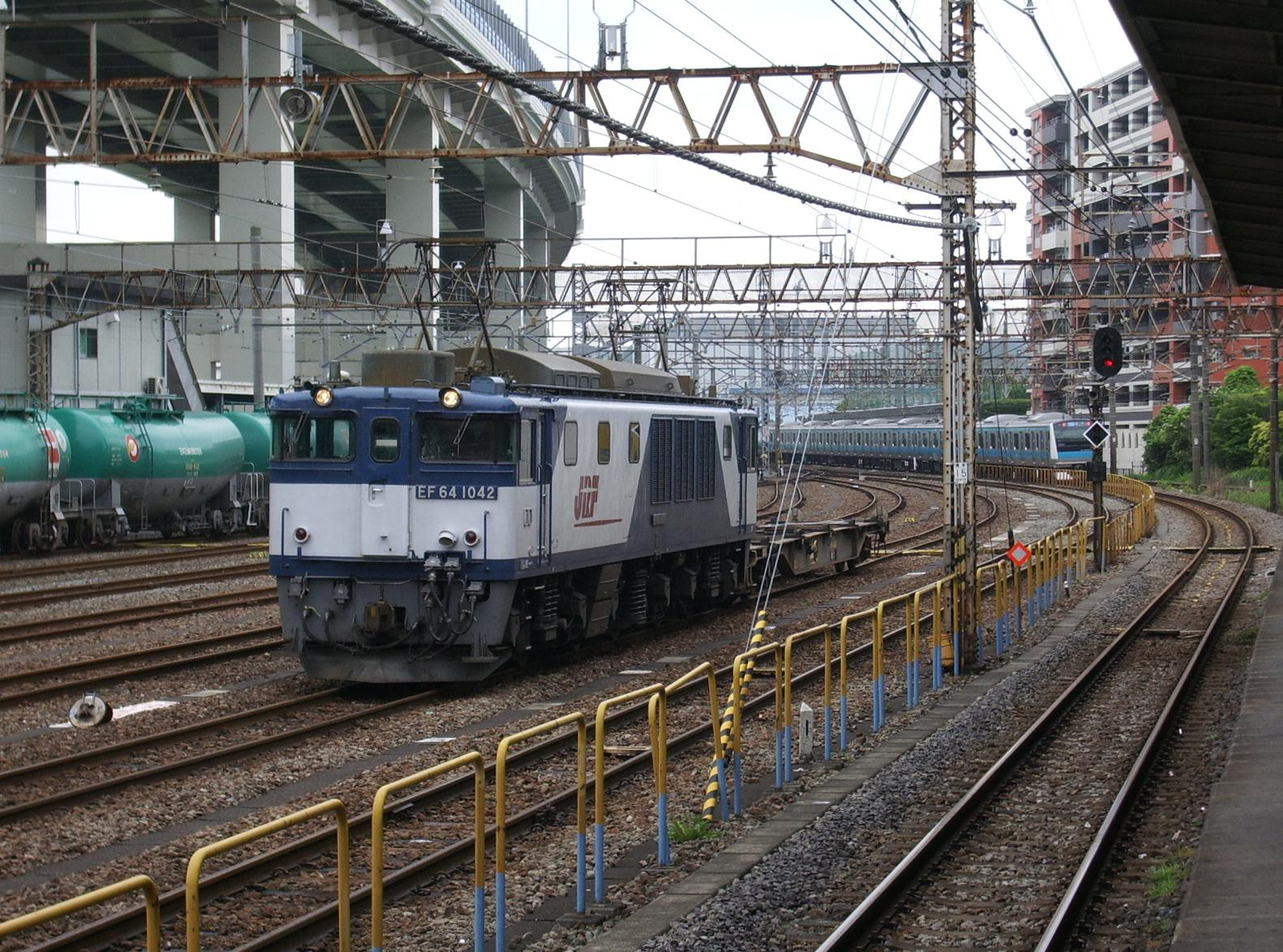
JR Freight EF64 locomotive at Negishi Station. June 2009.

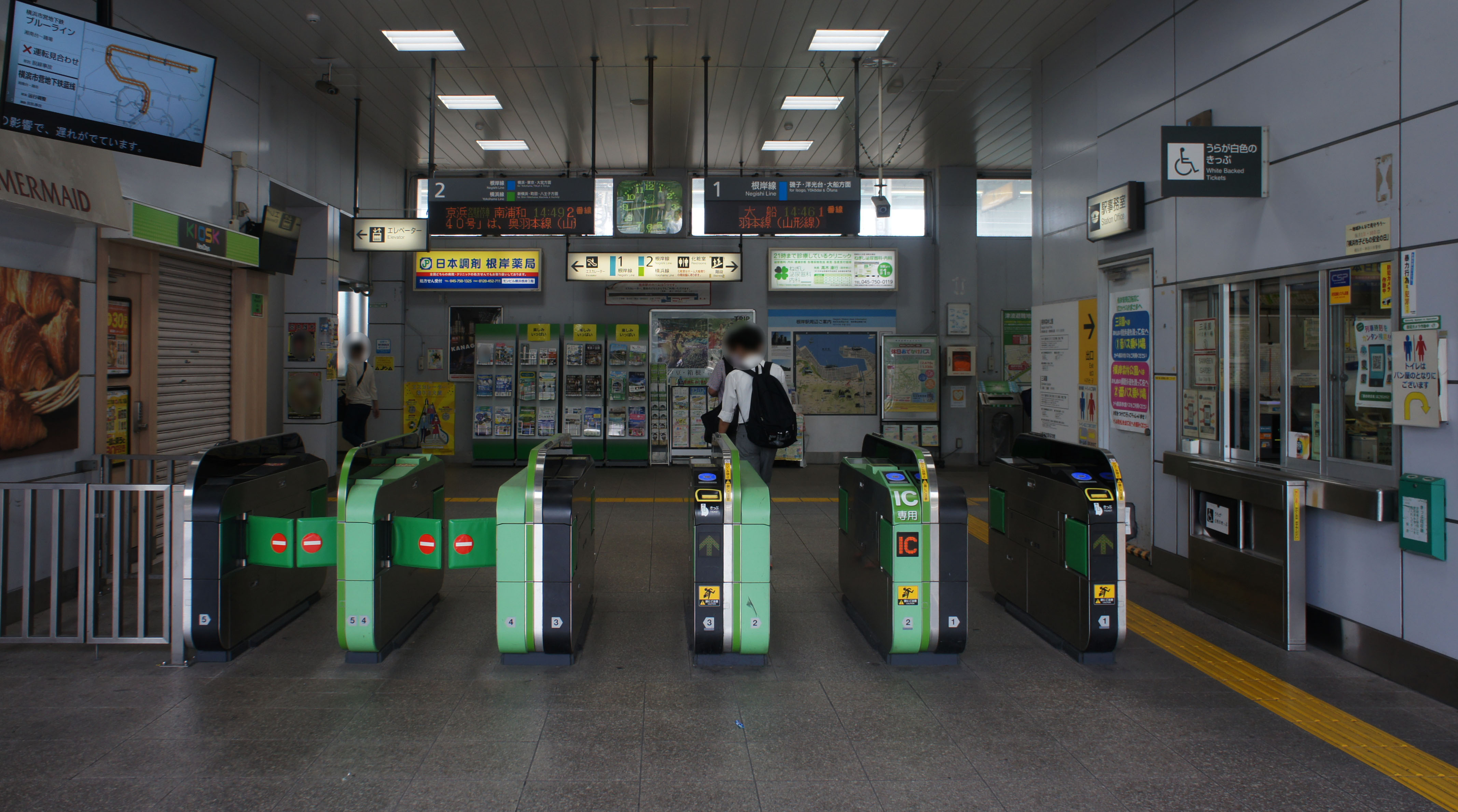
Ticket gates, Negishi Station. June 2019

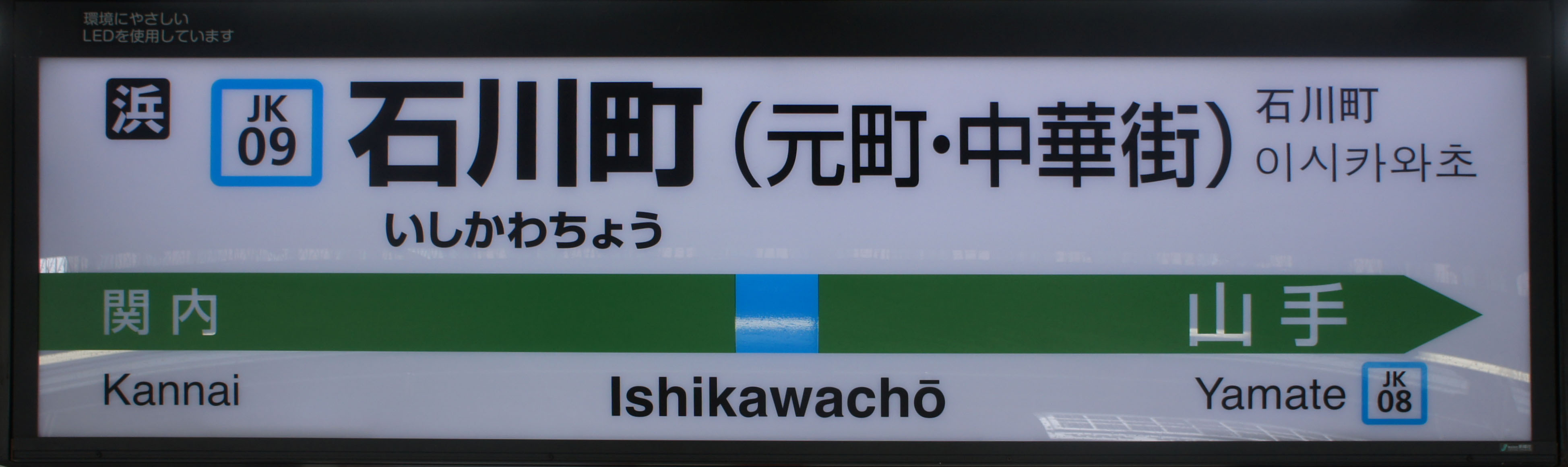
Station sign, Ishikawachō Station. June 2019
