= Kōnandai Station =

Railway station in Yokohama, Japan

JK03 Kōnandai Station 港南台駅
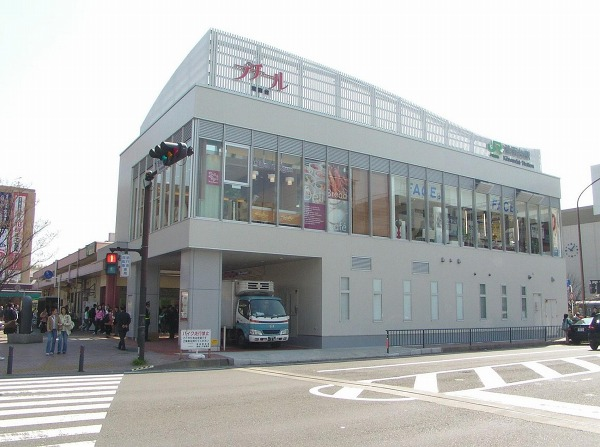
- Kōnandai Station

General information
- Location: Kōnandai 3-1-2, Kōnan-ku, Yokohama-shi, Kanagawa-ken 234-0054; Japan
- Coordinates: 35°22′31″N 139°34′36.1″E
- Operator: JR East
- Line: Negishi Line
- Distance: 16.0 km from Yokohama
- Platforms: 1 island platform
- Connections: Bus stop

Other information
- Status: Staffed (Midori no Madoguchi)
- Station code: JK03
- Website: Official website

History
- Opened: 9 April 1973

Passengers
- FY2019: 31,683 daily

Services
Preceding station	JR East	Following station
Hongōdai JK02 towards Ōfuna	Negishi Line	Yōkōdai JK04 towards Yokohama
Hongōdai JK02 towards Ōfuna	Yokohama Line Local	Yōkōdai JK04 towards Hachiōji
Location
- Location within Kanagawa Prefecture Location within Japan

Kōnandai Station (港南台駅, Kōnandai-eki) is a passenger railway station located in Kōnan-ku, Yokohama, Kanagawa Prefecture, Japan, operated by the East Japan Railway Company (JR East).

== Lines ==
Kōnandai Station is served by the Negishi Line from Yokohama to Ōfuna in Kanagawa Prefecture. with through services inter-running to and from the Keihin-Tōhoku Line and also the Yokohama Line. It is 16.0 kilometers from the terminus of the Negishi line at Yokohama, and 75.1 kilometers from the northern terminus of the Keihin-Tōhoku Line at Ōmiya.

== Station layout ==
The station consists of one island platform serving two tracks. The platform is connected to the station building by a footbridge. The station has a "Midori no Madoguchi" staffed ticket office.

=== Platforms ===
1	Negishi Line	for Hongōdai and Ōfuna
2	Negishi Line-Keihin-Tohoku Line	for Yokohama, Tokyo, and Ōmiya
2	Yokohama Line	for Yokohama, Nagatsuta, Machida, and Hachiōji

== History ==
The area around Kōnandai Station was controlled by the American military in the post-war era. The property was returned to the Japanese government by 1965 and developed into a housing district. The Japan National Railways (JNR) Keihin-Tōhoku Line was extended from its former terminus at Yōkōdai Station through to Ōfuna Station in 1973, and Kōnandai Station was opened on 9 April 1973. The station came under the management of JR East on April 1, 1987, after the privatization of the JNR.

== Passenger statistics ==
In fiscal 2019, the station was used by an average of 31,683 passengers daily (boarding passengers only).

The passenger figures (boarding passengers only) for previous years are as shown below.

Fiscal year	daily average
2005	34,983
2010	33,248
2015	32,136

== Surrounding area ==
- Konandai 214 Building
- Onshi Foundation Saiseikai Yokohama Nanbu Hospital
- Konandai Hospital

== See also ==
- List of railway stations in Japan
