= Sakae-ku =

Sakae 栄区
- Ward
- Sakae Ward
- Flag
- /0/queryThe property query is required; /0/idsThe property ids is required; /0Failed to match at least one schema; /0/titleThe property title is required; /0/serviceDoes not have a value in the enumeration ["page"]; /0Failed to match exactly one schema; /0/geometriesThe property geometries is required; /0/typeDoes not have a value in the enumeration ["GeometryCollection"]; /0/typeDoes not have a value in the enumeration ["MultiPolygon"]; /0/typeDoes not have a value in the enumeration ["Point"]; /0/typeDoes not have a value in the enumeration ["MultiPoint"]; /0/typeDoes not have a value in the enumeration ["LineString"]; /0/typeDoes not have a value in the enumeration ["MultiLineString"]; /0/typeDoes not have a value in the enumeration ["Polygon"]; /0/coordinatesThe property coordinates is required; /0/geometryThe property geometry is required; /0/typeDoes not have a value in the enumeration ["Feature"]; /0/featuresThe property features is required; /0/typeDoes not have a value in the enumeration ["FeatureCollection"]
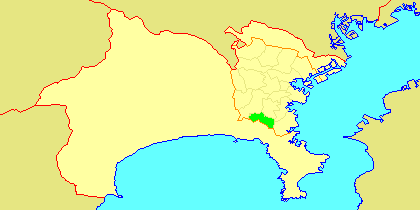
- Location of Sakae in Kanagawa

- Sakae (Japan)
- Coordinates: 35°21′52″N 139°33′15″E
- Country: Japan
- Region: Kantō
- Prefecture: Kanagawa
- City: Yokohama

Area
  - Total: 18.55 km^{2} (7.16 sq mi)

Population (February 2010)
  - Total: 124,845
  - Density: 6,750/km^{2} (17,500/sq mi)
- Time zone: UTC+9 (Japan Standard Time)
- Flower: Chrysanthemum
- Address: 303-19 Katsura-chō, Sakae-ku Yokohama-shi, Kanagawa-ken; 247-0005
- Website: Sakae Ward Office

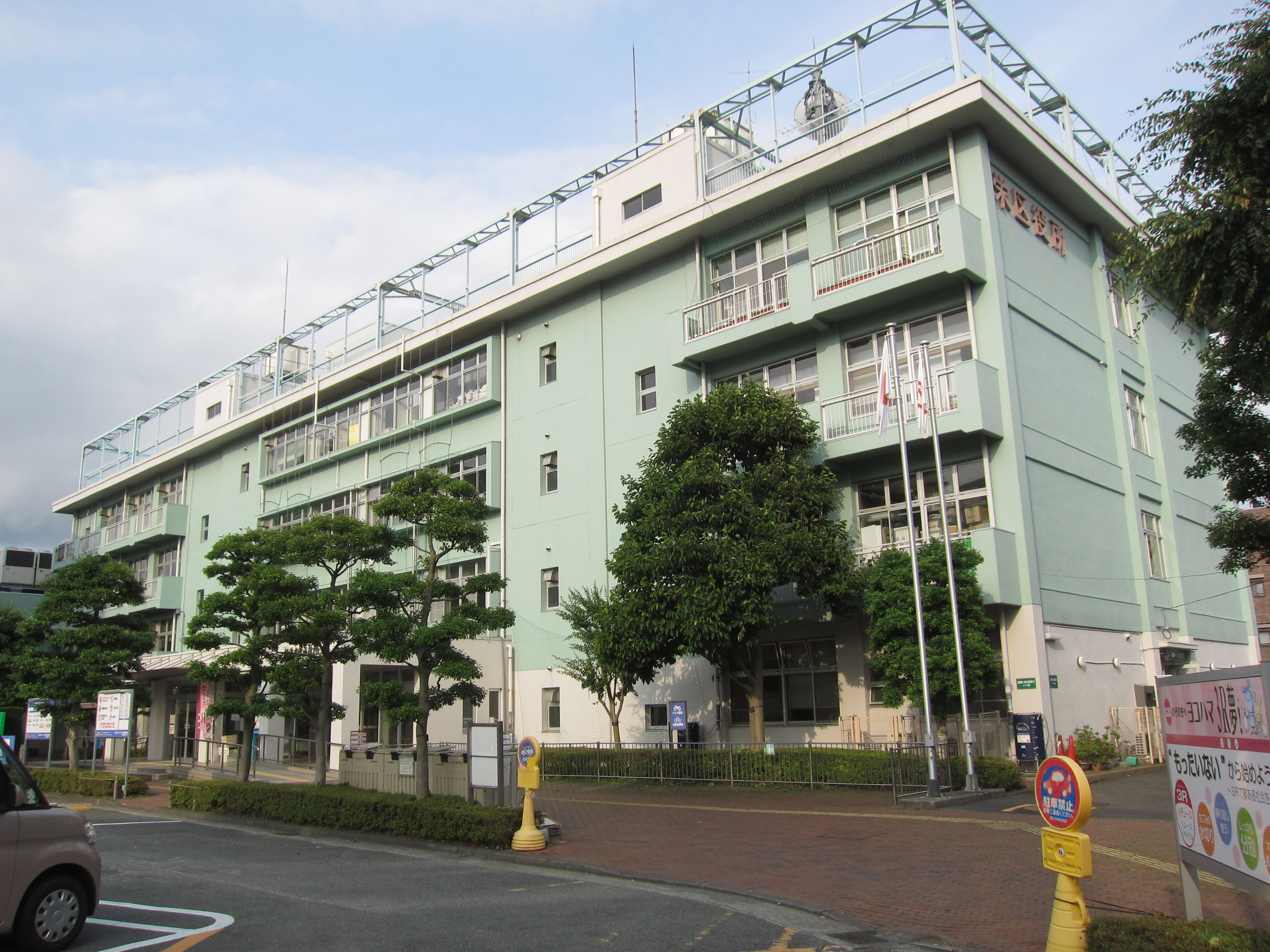
Sakae Ward Office

Sakae-ku (栄区) is one of the 18 wards of the city of Yokohama in Kanagawa Prefecture, Japan. As of 2010, the ward had an estimated population of 124,845 and a density of 6,750 persons per km^{2}. The total area was 18.55 km^{2}.

== Geography ==
Sakae Ward is located in eastern Kanagawa Prefecture, and on the southwestern borders of the city of Yokohama. The area is largely flatland, with scattered small hills.

=== Surrounding municipalities ===
- Isogo Ward
- Kanazawa Ward
- Totsuka Ward
- Konan Ward
- Kamakura, Kanagawa

== History ==
The area around present-day Sakae Ward has been inhabited continuously for thousands of years. Archaeologists have found stone tools from the Japanese Paleolithic period and ceramic shards from the Jōmon period, house ruins from the Yayoi period and tombs from the Kofun period at numerous locations in the area. Under the Nara period Ritsuryō system, it became part of Kamakura District in Sagami Province. By the Kamakura period, much of the area was farmland supporting the population of nearby Kamakura. Most of the area came under the control of the Nagao clan, the ancestors of the Uesugi clan. During the Edo period, the territory came under the control of Tokugawa Ieyasu. It was administered as tenryō territory controlled directly by the Tokugawa shogunate, but administered through various hatamoto.

After the Meiji Restoration, Sakae became part of the new Kanagawa Prefecture in 1868. In the cadastral reform of April 1, 1889, the area was divided into Hongo, Sakae and Toyota villages under Kamakura District. In 1938, the Imperial Japanese Navy established a large fuel depot in former Hongo Village. On April 1, 1939, Sakae was annexed by the neighboring city of Yokohama, becoming part of Totsuka Ward. In the post-war period, parts of Sakae were used as a residential area for the American occupation forces. All American facilities were returned to Japan by 1967. In a major administrative reorganization of October 1, 1969, Totsuka-ku was divided, and Sakae emerged as an independent ward within the city of Yokohama.

== Economy ==
Sakae Ward is largely a regional commercial center and bedroom community for central Yokohama and Tokyo. There are a number of industries, including factories operated by Nikon, Fancl, Sumitomo Electric Industries and Shibaura Mecatronics.

== Transportation ==
=== Railroads ===
- JR East – Negishi Line
  - Hongōdai
- The Yokosuka Line and Tōkaidō Main Line pass through Sakae Ward, but without any stations.

=== Highways ===
- Ken-Ō Expressway

== Education ==
Prefectural senior high schools are operated by the Kanagawa Prefectural Board of Education:

- Hakuyō High School
- Kanai High School
- Yokohama-Sakae High School

Private secondary school:

- Yamate Gakuin Junior & Senior High School

Yokohama Municipal Board of Education operates municipal elementary schools and junior high schools.

Junior high schools:

- Hongō (本郷)
- Iijima (飯島)
- Kamigō (上郷)
- Katsuradai (桂台)
- Koyamadai (小山台)
- Nishihongō (西本郷)

Elementary schools:

- Hongō (本郷)
- Hongōdai (本郷台)
- Iijima (飯島)
- Kamigō (上郷)
- Kasama (笠間)
- Katsuradai (桂台)
- Kosugaya (小菅ケ谷)
- Koyamadai (小山台)
- Kuden (公田)
- Nishihongō (西本郷)
- Sakurai (桜井)
- Senshū (千秀)
- Shōdo (庄戸)
- Toyoda (豊田)

Additionally, Hino Minami Elementary School (日野南小学校) and Konandaidaini (No. 2) Elementary School (港南台第二小学校), outside of Sakae-ku, have attendance zones including parts of Sakae-ku.

Noshichiri Elementary School merged with Shodo Elementary School in March 2006.

== Notable people from Sakae Ward ==
- Shigetoshi Hasebe, former professional soccer player, current manager of Kawasaki Frontale
- Hironori Kusano, singer
- Daisuke Maki, (singer, member of EXILE )
- Kozo Yuki, professional soccer player
- Yasuto Wakizaka, professional soccer player
