= Isogo-ku =

Isogo 磯子区
- Ward
- Isogo Ward
- Flag

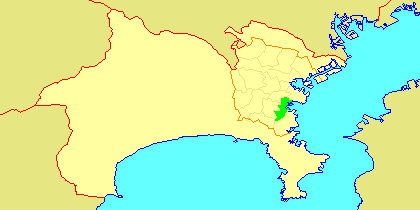
- Location of Isogo in Kanagawa

- Isogo (Japan)
- Coordinates: 35°24′8″N 139°37′8″E
- Country: Japan
- Region: Kantō
- Prefecture: Kanagawa
- City: Yokohama

Area
  - Total: 19.17 km^{2} (7.40 sq mi)

Population (February 2010)
  - Total: 163,406
  - Density: 8,520/km^{2} (22,100/sq mi)
- Time zone: UTC+9 (Japan Standard Time)
- Tree: Prunus mume
- Flower: Cosmos
- Address: 3-5-1 Isogo, Isogo-ku Yokohama-shi, Kanagawa-ken; 235-0016
- Website: Isogo Ward Office

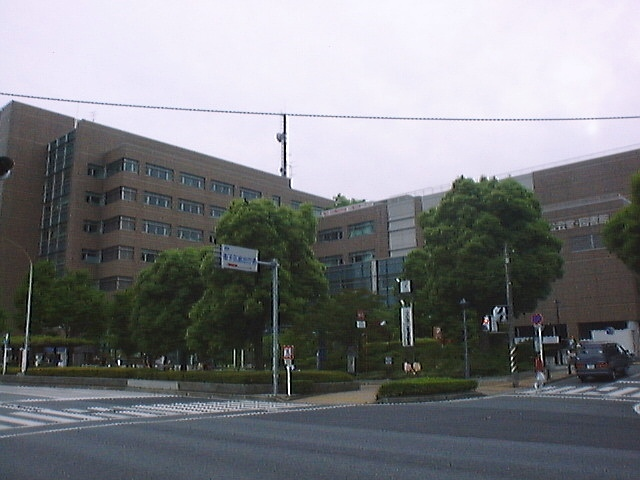
Isogo Ward Office

Isogo-ku (磯子区) is one of the 18 wards of the city of Yokohama in Kanagawa Prefecture, Japan. As of 2010, the ward has an estimated population of 163,406 and a population density of 8,520 persons per km^{2}. The total area is 19.17 km^{2}.

== Geography ==
Isogo is located in eastern Kanagawa Prefecture, and in the southeast corner of the city of Yokohama. The area is largely flatland, with scattered small hills. The Ward is bordered to the east by Negishi Bay, a minor bay on the coast of larger Tokyo Bay.

=== Surrounding municipalities ===
- Naka Ward
- Minami Ward
- Kanazawa Ward
- Sakae Ward
- Kōnan-ku

== History ==
During the Edo period, area around present-day Isogo Ward was formerly part of the tenryō territory in Sagami Province controlled directly by the Tokugawa shogunate, but administered through various hatamoto. The area consisted of small fishing villages, noted primarily for their catch of Sea cucumber. After the Meiji Restoration, the area became part of Kuraki District in the new Kanagawa Prefecture. In the cadastral reform of April 1, 1889, the area was divided into numerous villages. On April 1, 1901, Negishi village was annexed by neighboring Yokohama. The remaining northern portions of the district were annexed in 1911 and 1927. On October 10, 1927, the 14 former towns and villages were re-organized as Isogo Ward within the city of Yokohama.

Isogo Ward annexed the remaining southern portions of Kuraki District (Kanazawa Town and Mutsuuraso Village) in October 1936. During World War II, Isogo was bombed twice: once on April 15, 1945, and again during the devastating Yokohama Air Raid of May 29, 1945, during which 692 houses were burned down. On May 15, 1948, Kanazawa Ward was separated from Isogo Ward. During the 1960s, the coastal areas of Isogo were converted into a massive chemical and petrochemical industrial zone through the extensive use of landfill, and the population of the area increased dramatically. The Isogo Ward offices relocated to their present location in June 1967.

== Economy ==
Isogo is largely a regional commercial center and bedroom community for central Yokohama, Kawasaki and Tokyo. The coastal area is part of the Keihin heavy industrial zone, and has numerous chemical and petrochemical plants.

== Transportation ==
=== Railroads ===
- East Japan Railway Company - Negishi Line
  - Negishi- Isogo - Shin-Sugita - Yōkōdai
- Keihin Electric Express Railway-Keikyū Main Line
  - Byōbugaura - Sugita
- Yokohama New Transit Co., Ltd - Kanazawa Seaside Line
  - Shin-Sugita

=== Highways ===
- Bayshore Route
- National Route 16
- National Route 357
- Kanagawa Prefectural Road 22

== Education ==
Kanagawa Prefectural Board of Education operates prefectural high schools. They are:

- Hitorizawa High School
- Isogo High School
- Isogo Technical High School

Yokohama Municipal Board of Education operates a municipal high school:

- Yokohama Commercial High School(Barber and beautician)

The municipal board of education also operates public elementary and junior high schools.

Junior high schools:

- Hama (浜)
- Mori (森)
- Negishi (根岸)
- Okamura (岡村)
- Shiomidai (汐見台)
- Yōkōdai-Dai-ichi (No. 1) (洋光台第一)
- Yōkōdai-Daini (No. 2) (洋光台第二)

Elementary schools:

- Bairin (梅林)
- Byōbugaura (屏風浦)
- Hama (浜)
- Isogo (磯子)
- Mori-higashi (森東)
- Negishi (根岸)
- Okamura (岡村)
- Sannōdai (山王台)
- Sawanosato (さわの里)
- Shiomidai (汐見台)
- Sugita (杉田)
- Takigashira (滝頭)
- Yōkōdai-Dai-ichi (洋光台第一)
- Yōkōdai-Daini (洋光台第二)
- Yōkōdai-Daisan (No. 3) (洋光台第三)
- Yōkōdai-Daiyon (No. 4) (洋光台第四)

Additionally, Fujinoki Elementary School (藤の木小学校), Hishita Elementary School (日下小学校), Koda Elementary School (小田小学校), and Nishi-Tomioka Elementary School (西富岡小学校), outside of Isogo-ku, have attendance zones including parts of Isogo-ku.

Private high and secondary schools:

- Yokohama Gakuen
- Kashima Gakuen High School(Isogo Serendip campus)

The South Korean government maintains the Korea Education Institution in Kanagawa (Korean: 가나가와한국종합교육원, Japanese: 神奈川韓国綜合教育院) in this ward.

== Notable people ==
- Hibari Misora, singer and actress
- Nobuhiko Takada, professional wrestler
- Haru Nemuri, singer
