= Negishi Station =

Negishi Station (根岸駅) is the name of two train stations in Japan:

- Negishi Station (Kanagawa)
- Negishi Station (Fukushima)
