= Kanagawa Rinkai Railway =

Japanese railway company

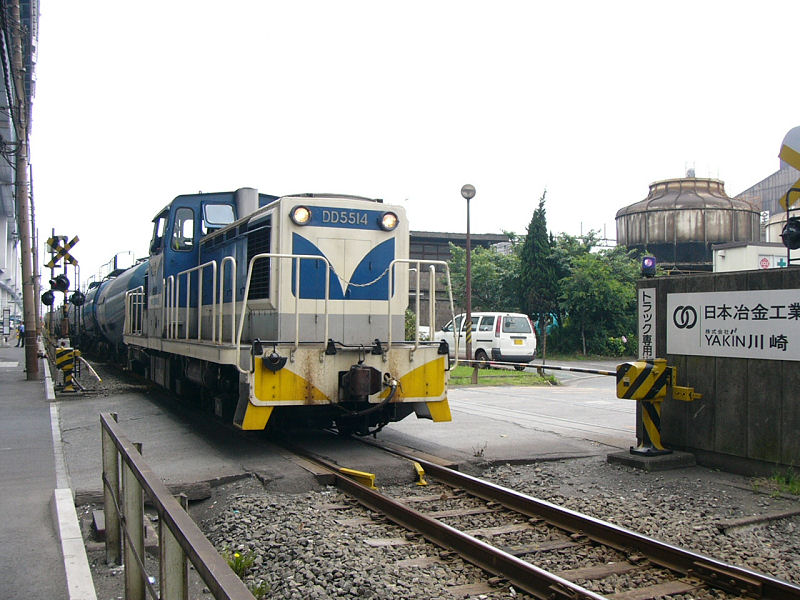
Freight train headed by a DD55 series diesel locomotive on the Ukishima Line

The Kanagawa Rinkai Railway (神奈川臨海鉄道, Kanagawa Rinkai Tetsudō; "Kanagawa Seaside Railway") is a freight-only railway company in Kanagawa Prefecture, Japan, abbreviated as Kanarin (かなりん). The third sector company (in the Japanese sense) was founded in 1963. The company also operates real estate businesses, such as warehouses. The Honmoku Line in Yokohama mainly transports containers for the Port of Yokohama. In contrast, the other three lines in Kawasaki mainly transport chemical products and petroleum for the Keihin Industrial Area.

== Lines ==
The first three lines listed below are in Kawasaki and opened in 1963. The Honmoku line is situated in Yokohama and opened in 1969.

A map of the Kanagawa Rinkai Tetsudo freight lines in the Kawasaki area.

A map of the Kanagawa Rinkai Tetsudo Honmoku line

- Ukishima Line (浮島線)
  - Kawasaki Freight—Ukishimachō: 3.9 km
- Chidori Line (千鳥線)
  - Kawasaki Freight—Chidorichō: 4.2 km
- Honmoku Line (本牧線)
  - Negishi—Honmoku-Futō: 5.6 km

Former lines

- Mizue Line (水江線)
  - Kawasaki Freight—Mizuechō: 2.6 km

== See also ==
- List of railway companies in Japan
