= Negishi Bay =

Gulf in Japan

Coordinates: 35.3981°N 139.652°E

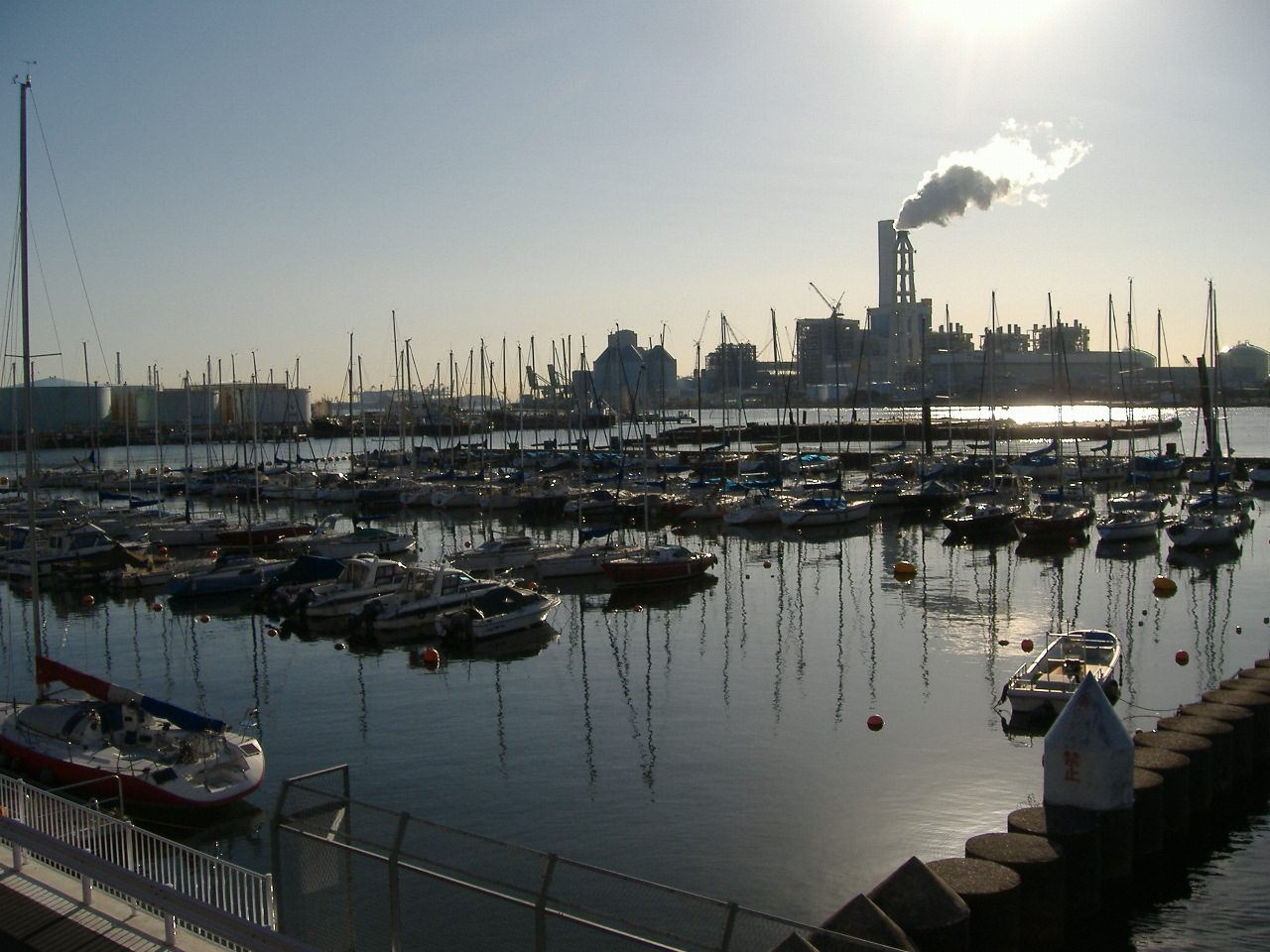
Negishi Bay, near Yokohama Civic Yacht Harbor

Negishi Bay (根岸湾, Negishi Wan) is a bay south of Yokohama on the west side of Tokyo Bay. Isogo faces this bay.
