= Hongōdai Station =

Railway station in Yokohama, Japan

JK02 Hongōdai Station 本郷台駅
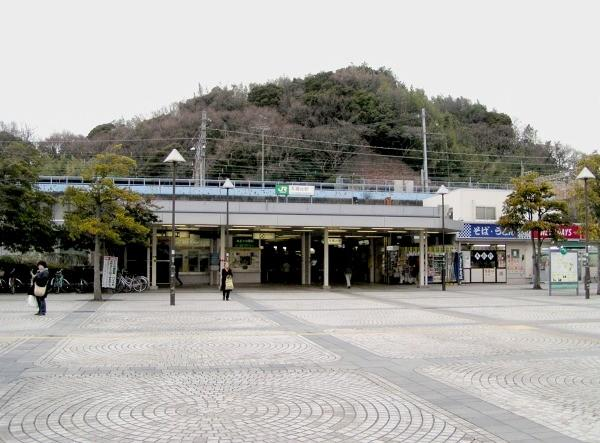
- Hongōdai Station

General information
- Location: 1 Kosugaya-cho, Sakae-ku, Yokohama-shi, Kanagawa-ken 247-0007; Japan
- Coordinates: 35°22′3″N 139°33′1″E
- Operator: JR East
- Line: Negishi Line
- Distance: 18.5 km from Yokohama
- Platforms: 1 island platform

Other information
- Status: Staffed (Midori no Madoguchi)
- Station code: JK02
- Website: Official website

History
- Opened: 9 April 1973

Passengers
- FY2019: 18,564 daily

Services
Preceding station	JR East	Following station
Ōfuna Terminus	Negishi Line	Kōnandai JK03 towards Yokohama
Ōfuna Terminus	Yokohama Line Local	Kōnandai JK03 towards Hachiōji
Location
- Location within Kanagawa Prefecture Location within Japan

Hongōdai Station (本郷台駅, Hongōdai-eki) is a passenger railway station located in Sakae-ku, Yokohama, Kanagawa Prefecture, Japan, operated by the East Japan Railway Company (JR East).

== Lines ==
Hongōdai Station is served by the Negishi Line from Yokohama to Ōfuna in Kanagawa Prefecture. with through services inter-running to and from the Keihin-Tōhoku Line and also the Yokohama Line. It is 18.5 kilometers from the terminus of the Negishi line at Yokohama, and 77.6 kilometers from the northern terminus of the Keihin-Tōhoku Line at Ōmiya.

== Station layout ==
The station consists of one island platform serving two tracks. The platform is connected to the station building by an underpass. The station has a "Midori no Madoguchi" staffed ticket office.

=== Platforms ===
1	Negishi Line	for Ōfuna
2	Negishi Line-Keihin-Tohoku Line	for Yokohama, Tokyo, and Ōmiya
2	Yokohama Line	for Yokohama, Nagatsuta, Machida, and Hachiōji

== History ==
Hongōdai Station opened on 9 April 1973. With the privatization of JNR on 1 April 1987, the station came under the control of JR East.

== Passenger statistics ==
In fiscal 2019, the station was used by an average of 18,564 passengers daily (boarding passengers only).

The passenger figures (boarding passengers only) for previous years are as shown below.

Fiscal year	daily average
2005	18,979
2010	19,167
2015	18,859

== Surrounding area ==
- Sakae Ward Office
- Sakae Library
- Yokohama Sakae Mutual Aid Hospital
- Kanagawa Prefectural Hakuyo High School
- Hongodai Ekimae housing complex
- Kanagawa Plaza For Global Citizenship (Earth Plaza)

== See also ==
- List of railway stations in Japan
