= Negishi Station (Kanagawa) =

Railway station in Yokohama, Japan

JK07 Negishi Station 根岸駅
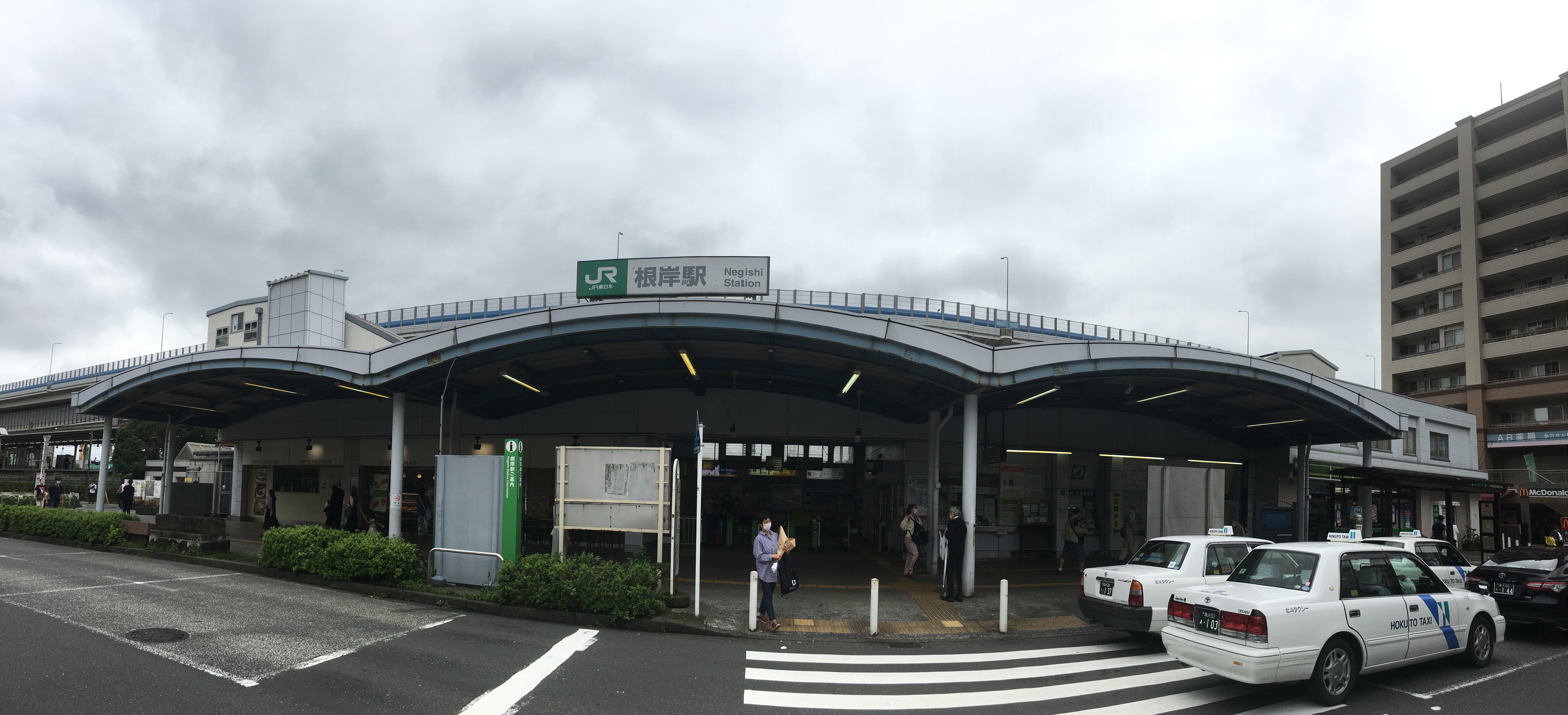
- Negishi Station, 2021

General information
- Location: Higashi-chō 16-1, Isogo-ku, Yokohama-shi, Kanagawa-ken 235-0005; Japan
- Coordinates: 35.416°N 139.635°E
- Operator: JR East; JR Freight; Kanagawa Rinkai Railway
- Line: Negishi Line
- Distance: 7.1 km from Yokohama
- Platforms: 1 island platform
- Connections: Bus stop

Other information
- Status: Staffed (Midori no Madoguchi)
- Station code: JK07
- Website: Official website

History
- Opened: May 19, 1964

Passengers
- FY2019: 21,998 daily

Services
Preceding station	JR East	Following station
Isogo JK06 towards Ōfuna	Negishi Line	Yamate JK08 towards Yokohama
Isogo JK06 towards Ōfuna	Yokohama Line Local	Yamate JK08 towards Hachiōji
Location
- Location within Kanagawa Prefecture Location within Japan

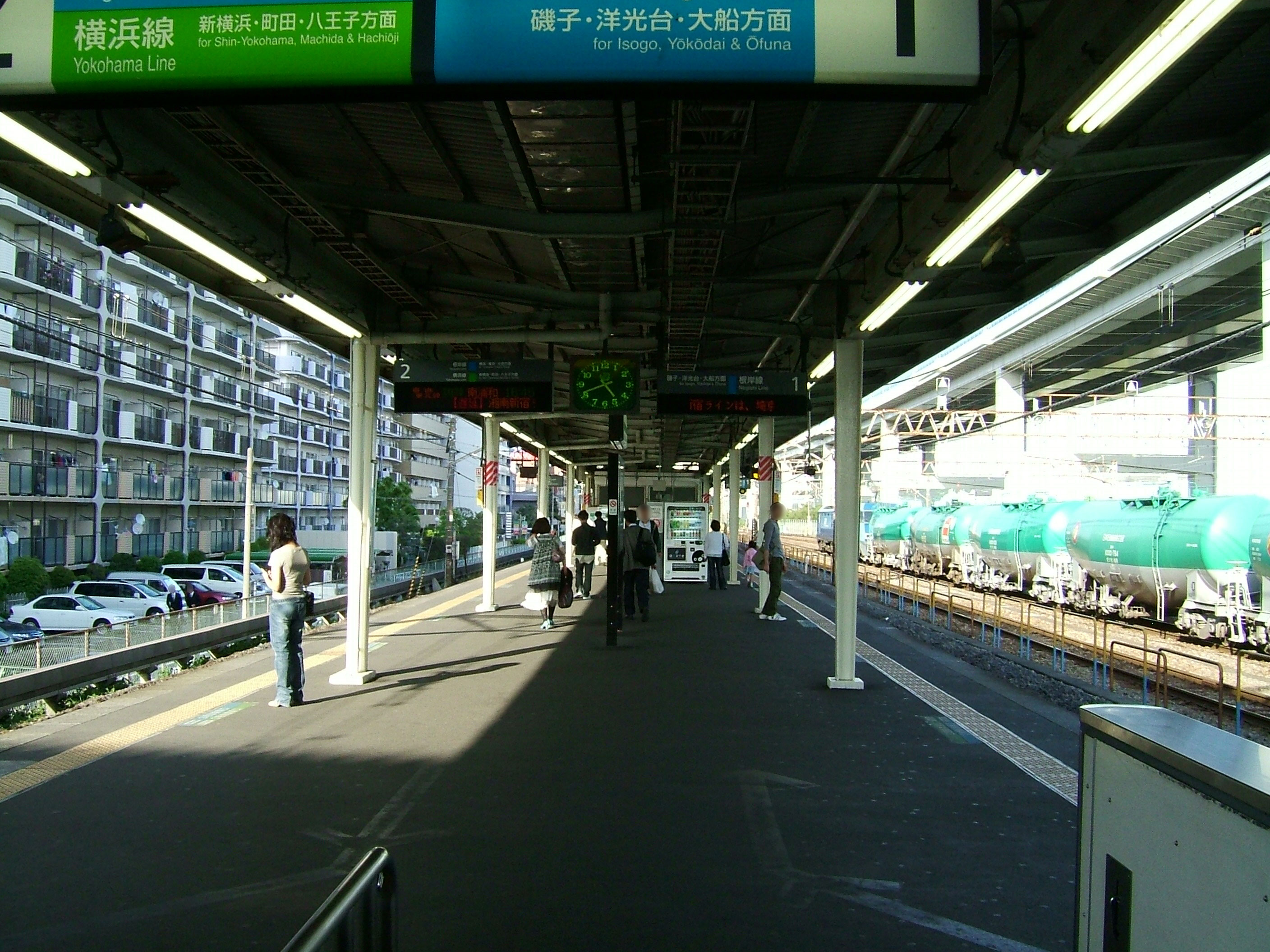
Platform

Negishi Station (根岸駅, Negishi-eki) is a passenger railway station located in Isogo-ku, Yokohama, Kanagawa Prefecture, Japan, operated by the East Japan Railway Company (JR East). The station is also a freight terminal on the Japan Freight Railway Company, as well as the terminus for the all-freight Honmoku Line of the Kanagawa Rinkai Railway.

== Lines ==
Negishi Station is served by the Negishi Line from Yokohama to Ōfuna in Kanagawa Prefecture. with through services inter-running to and from the Keihin-Tōhoku Line and also the Yokohama Line. It is 7.1 kilometers from the terminus of the Negishi line at Yokohama, and 66.2 kilometers from the northern terminus of the Keihin-Tōhoku Line at Ōmiya.

== Station layout ==
The station consists of an island platform serving two tracks for normal passenger operations, and an additional five tracks for freight operations. The station has a "Midori no Madoguchi" staffed ticket office.

=== Platforms ===
1	Negishi Line	for Isogo and Ōfuna
2	Negishi Line-Keihin-Tohoku Line	for Yokohama, Tokyo, and Ōmiya
2	Yokohama Line	for Yokohama, Nagatsuta, Machida, and Hachiōji

== History ==
Negishi Station was opened on May 19, 1964, as a station on the Japan National Railways (JNR) for both passenger and freight services. The Kanagawa Rinkai Railway's Honmoku Line, also for freight-only operations, began operations from Negishi on October 1, 1969. The station was absorbed into the JR East network upon the privatization of the Japan National Railways (JNR) in 1987.

== Passenger statistics ==
In fiscal 2019, the station was used by an average of 21,998 passengers daily (boarding passengers only).

The passenger figures (boarding passengers only) for previous years are as shown below.

Fiscal year	daily average
2005	19,828
2010	20,594
2015	21,572

== Surrounding area ==
- ENEOS Negishi Refinery
- Kanagawa Prefectural Hygiene Nursing College
- Yokohama Municipal Negishi Junior High School
- Yokohama Municipal Negishi Elementary School

== See also ==
- List of railway stations in Japan
