= Isogo Station =

Railway station in Yokohama, Japan

JK06 Isogo Station 磯子駅
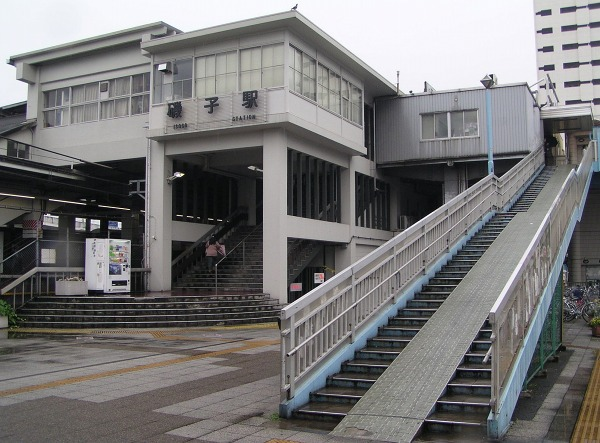
- Isogo Station west exit

General information
- Location: 1-1-1 Mori, Isogo-ku, Yokohama-shi, Kanagawa-ken 235-0023; Japan
- Coordinates: 35.400°N 139.618°E
- Operator: JR East
- Line: Negishi Line
- Distance: 9.5 km from Yokohama
- Platforms: 1 island platform

Other information
- Status: Staffed
- Station code: JK06
- Website: Official website

History
- Opened: May 9, 1964

Passengers
- FY2019: 20,199 daily

Services
Preceding station	JR East	Following station
Shin-Sugita JK05 towards Ōfuna	Negishi Line	Negishi JK07 towards Yokohama
Shin-Sugita JK05 towards Ōfuna	Yokohama Line Local	Negishi JK07 towards Hachiōji
Location
- Location within Kanagawa Prefecture Location within Japan

Isogo Station (磯子駅, Isogo-eki) is a passenger railway station located in Isogo-ku, Yokohama, Kanagawa Prefecture, Japan, operated by the East Japan Railway Company (JR East).

== Lines ==
Isogo Station is served by the Negishi Line from Yokohama to Ōfuna in Kanagawa Prefecture. with through services inter-running to and from the Keihin-Tōhoku Line and also the Yokohama Line. It is 9.5 kilometers from the terminus of the Negishi line at Yokohama, and 68.6 kilometers from the northern terminus of the Keihin-Tōhoku Line at Ōmiya.

== Station layout ==
The station consists of a single island platform with a two tracks and an elevated station building above the platform and tracks. Both tracks are utilised by the Keihin-Tohoku Line and Yokohama Line; track 1 serves southbound trains to Ōfuna whilst track 2 serves northbound trains to Yokohama and Tokyo. The station is staffed. An adjacent side platform formerly used to support freight operations, was sold to the Nisshin OilliO Group.

=== Platforms ===
1	Negishi Line	for Shin-Sugita, and Ōfuna
2	Negishi Line-Keihin-Tohoku Line	for Yokohama, Tokyo, and Ōmiya
2	Yokohama Line	for Yokohama, Nagatsuta, Machida, and Hachiōji

== History ==
Isogo Station opened on May 9, 1964 as the terminus of the Negishi Line until the line was extended to Yōkōdai in 1970. All freight operations were suspended from October 1986. The station was absorbed into the JR East network upon the privatization of the Japanese National Railways (JNR) in 1987. The station building was extensively remodelled in 2000 with the addition of ticket gates, automatic ticket machines, and new ticket windows.

== Passenger statistics ==
In fiscal 2019, the station was used by an average of 20,199 passengers daily (boarding passengers only).

The passenger figures (boarding passengers only) for previous years are as shown below.

Fiscal year	daily average
2005	19,085
2010	18,456
2015	20,183

== Surrounding area ==
- Isogo Ward General Government Building
- Isogo Ward Office
- Yokohama City Isogo Library
- Isogo Public Hall
- Koshinkai Shiomidai Hospital

== See also ==
- List of railway stations in Japan
