= List of libraries in Japan =

This is a list of libraries (図書館, toshokan) in Japan.

== Background ==
Isonokami no Yakatsugu's Nara period Untei (芸亭) is held out to be Japan's first public library, but private libraries, such as Kanazawa Bunko, remained the norm until modern times. The Imperial Library, one of the predecessors to the National Diet Library, was established towards the end of the nineteenth century. In 1948, during the Occupation, the National Diet Library Act (ja) was passed, creating Japan's sole national library, followed in 1950 by the Library Act (ja), the twenty nine articles of which cover both public libraries (公立図書館) (Chapter II) and private libraries (私立図書館) (Chapter III).

== National library ==
- National Diet Library (国立国会図書館, Kokuritsu Kokkai Toshokan)
  - Kansai-kan of the National Diet Library (国立国会図書館関西館, Kokuritsu Kokkai Toshokan Kansai-kan)
  - International Library of Children's Literature (国際子ども図書館, Kokusai Kodomo Toshokan)

== Public libraries ==
As of 2008, there were 3,106 public libraries in Japan, including: 1 regional library, 62 prefectural libraries, 2,433 city libraries, and 610 town libraries.

=== Prefectural libraries ===
==== Hokkaidō region ====
- Hokkaido Prefectural Library (北海道立図書館, Hokkaidō-ritsu Toshokan)

==== Tōhoku region ====
- Aomori Prefectural Library (青森県立図書館, Aomori-kenritsu Toshokan)
- Iwate Prefectural Library (岩手県立図書館, Iwate-kenritsu Toshokan)
- Miyagi Prefectural Library (宮城県図書館, Miyagi-ken Toshokan)
- Akita Prefectural Library (秋田県立図書館, Akita-kenritsu Toshokan)
- Yamagata Prefectural Library (山形県立図書館, Yamagata-kenritsu Toshokan)
- Fukushima Prefectural Library (福島県立図書館, Fukushima-kenritsu Toshokan)

==== Kantō region ====
- Ibaraki Prefectural Library (茨城県立図書館, Ibaraki-kenritsu Toshokan)
- Tochigi Prefectural Library (栃木県立図書館, Tochigi-kenritsu Toshokan)
  - Tochigi Prefectural Ashikaga Library (栃木県立足利図書館, Tochigi-kenritsu Ashikaga Toshokan)
- Gunma Prefectural Library (群馬県立図書館, Gunma-kenritsu Toshokan)
  - Gunma Prefectural Braille Library (群馬県立点字図書館, Gunma-kenritsu Tenji Toshokan)
- Saitama Prefectural Library (埼玉県立図書館, Saitama-kenritsu Toshokan)
- Chiba Prefectural Library (千葉県立図書館, Chiba-kenritsu Toshokan)
  - Chiba Prefectural Central Library (千葉県立中央図書館, Chiba-kenritsu Chūō Toshokan)
  - Chiba Prefectural West Library (千葉県立西部図書館, Chiba-kenritsu Seibu Toshokan)
  - Chiba Prefectural East Library (千葉県立東部図書館, Chiba-kenritsu Tōbu Toshokan)
- Tokyo Metropolitan Library (東京都立図書館, Tōkyō-toritsu Toshokan)
  - Tokyo Metropolitan Central Library (東京都立中央図書館, Tōkyō-toritsu Chūō Toshokan)
  - Tokyo Metropolitan Tama Library (東京都立多摩図書館, Tōkyō-toritsu Tama Toshokan)
- Kanagawa Prefectural Library (神奈川県立図書館, Kanagawa-kenritsu Toshokan)
  - Kanagawa Prefectural Kawasaki Library (神奈川県立川崎図書館, Kanagawa-kenritsu Kawasaki Toshokan)

==== Chūbu region ====
- Niigata Prefectural Library (新潟県立図書館, Nīgata-kenritsu Toshokan)
- Toyama Prefectural Library (富山県立図書館, Toyama-kenritsu Toshokan)
- Ishikawa Prefectural Library (石川県立図書館, Ishikawa-kenritsu Toshokan)
- Fukui Prefectural Library (福井県立図書館, Fukui-kenritsu Toshokan)
- Yamanashi Prefectural Library (山梨県立図書館, Yamanashi-kenritsu Toshokan)
- Nagano Prefectural Library (県立長野図書館, Kenritsu Nagano Toshokan)
- Gifu Prefectural Library (岐阜県図書館, Gifu-ken Toshokan)
- Shizuoka Prefectural Central Library (静岡県立中央図書館, Shizuoka-kenritsu Chūō Toshokan)
- Aichi Prefectural Library (愛知県図書館, Aichi-ken Toshokan)

==== Kinki region ====
- Mie Prefectural Library (三重県立図書館, Mie-kenritsu Toshokan)
- Shiga Prefectural Library (滋賀県立図書館, Shiga-kenritsu Toshokan)
- Kyoto Prefectural Library (京都府立図書館, Kyōto-furitsu Toshokan)
- Kyoto Prefectural Library and Archives (京都府立総合資料館, Kyōto-furitsu Sōgō Shiryōkan)
- Osaka Prefectural Library (大阪府立図書館, Ōsaka-furitsu Toshokan)
  - Osaka Prefectural Central Library (大阪府立中央図書館, Ōsaka-furitsu Chūō Toshokan)
  - Osaka Prefectural Nakanoshima Library (大阪府立中之島図書館, Ōsaka-furitsu Nakanoshima Toshokan)
- Hyogo Prefectural Library (兵庫県立図書館, Hyōgo-kenritsu Toshokan)
- Nara Prefectural Library and Information Center (奈良県立図書情報館, Nara-kenritsu Tosho Jōhōkan)
- Wakayama Prefectural Library (和歌山県立図書館, Wakayama-kenritsu Toshokan)
  - Wakayama Prefectural Kinan Library (和歌山県立紀南図書館, Wakayama-kenritsu Kinan Toshokan)

==== Chūgoku region ====
- Tottori Prefectural Library (鳥取県立図書館, Tottori-kenritsu Toshokan)
- Shimane Prefectural Library (島根県立図書館, Shimane-kenritsu Toshokan)
- Okayama Prefectural Library (岡山県立図書館, Okayama-kenritsu Toshokan)
- Hiroshima Prefectural Library (広島県立図書館, Hiroshima-kenritsu Toshokan)
- Yamaguchi Prefectural Library (山口県立山口図書館, Yamaguchi-kenritsu Yamaguchi Toshokan)

==== Shikoku region ====
- Tokushima Prefectural Library (徳島県立図書館, Tokushima-kenritsu Toshokan)
- Kagawa Prefectural Library (香川県立図書館, Kagawa-kenritsu Toshokan)
- Ehime Prefectural Library (愛媛県立図書館, Ehime-kenritsu Toshokan)
- Kochi Prefectural Library (高知県立図書館, Kōchi-kenritsu Toshokan)

==== Kyūsyū region ====
- Fukuoka Prefectural Library (福岡県立図書館, Fukuoka-kenritsu Toshokan)
- Saga Prefectural Library (佐賀県立図書館, Saga-kenritsu Toshokan)
- Nagasaki Prefectural Nagasaki Library (長崎県立長崎図書館, Nagasaki-kenritsu Nagasaki Toshokan)
- Kumamoto Prefectural Library (熊本県立図書館, Kumamoto-kenritsu Toshokan)
- Oita Prefectural Library (大分県立図書館, Ōita-kenritsu Toshokan)
- Miyazaki Prefectural Library (宮崎県立図書館, Miyazaki-kenritsu Toshokan)
- Kagoshima Prefectural Library (鹿児島県立図書館, Kagoshima-kenritsu Toshokan)
  - Kagoshima Prefectural Amami Library (鹿児島県立奄美図書館, Kagoshima-kenritsu Amami Toshokan)
- Okinawa Prefectural Library (沖縄県立図書館, Okinawa-kenritsu Toshokan)

=== Municipal libraries ===
- Hakodate City Central Library
- Tsuruma Central Library, City of Nagoya (名古屋市鶴舞中央図書館, Nagoya-shi Tsuruma Chūō Toshokan)
- Myoko City Library (妙高市図書館, myōkō shi toshokan)

== Special libraries ==
1,761 institutions were listed in the 2009 Directory of Special Libraries in Japan.

- E.H. Norman Library, Embassy of Canada
- Gunma Prefectural Braille Library (群馬県立点字図書館, Gunma-kenritsu Tenji Toshokan)
- Japan Braille Library (日本点字図書館, Nippon Tenji Toshokan)

== University libraries ==
In 2007, there were 758 four-year universities in Japan: 86 national, 77 public, 595 private.

- General Library, Kansai University (関西大学総合図書館, Kansai Daigaku Sōgō Toshokan)
- Keio University Media Center (慶應義塾大学メディアセンター, Keiō Gijuku Daigaku Media Center)
- Nagoya University Library (名古屋大学附属図書館, Nagoya Daigaku Fuzoku Toshokan)
- Tama Art University Library
- Sophia University Library (上智大学図書館, Jōchi Daigaku Toshokan)
  - Central Library (中央図書館, Chūō Toshokan)
  - Law School Library (法科大学院図書室, Hōka Daigakuin Toshoshitsu)
  - Mejiro Seibo Campus Library (目白聖母キャンパス図書館, Mejiro Seibo Kyanpasu Toshokan)
- Tenri Central Library (天理大学附属天理図書館, Tenri Daigaku Fuzoku Tenri Toshokan)
- Tokyo Institute of Technology Library (東京工業大学附属図書館, Tōkyō Kōgyō Daigaku Fuzoku Toshokan)
- University of Tokyo Library (東京大学附属図書館, Tōkyō Daigaku Fuzoku Toshokan)
  - General Library, The University of Tokyo (東京大学総合図書館, Tōkyō Daigaku Sōgō Toshokan)
  - Komaba Library, The University of Tokyo (東京大学駒場図書館, Tōkyō Daigaku Komaba Toshokan)
  - Kashiwa Library, The University of Tokyo (東京大学柏図書館, Tōkyō Daigaku Kashiwa Toshokan)
  - Medical Library, The University of Tokyo (東京大学医学図書館, Tōkyō Daigaku Igaku Toshokan)
  - Libraries for Engineering and Information Science & Technology, The University of Tokyo (東京大学工学・情報理工学図書館, Tōkyō Daigaku Kōgaku Jōhō Rikōgaku Toshokan)
  - University Library for Agricultural and Life Sciences, The University of Tokyo (東京大学農学生命科学図書館, Tōkyō Daigaku Nōgaku Seimeikagaku Toshokan)
  - The Library of Economics, University of Tokyo (東京大学経済学図書館, Tōkyō Daigaku Keizaigaku Toshokan)
  - Pharmaceutical Sciences Library, The University of Tokyo (東京大学薬学図書館, Tōkyō Daigaku Yakugaku Toshokan)
- Waseda University Library (早稲田大学図書館, Waseda Daigaku Toshokan)

It is also reported that almost all schools in Japan have libraries.

== See also ==
- Copyright law of Japan
- Library associations in Japan
- List of archives in Japan
- Mass media in Japan
