= Majikina Ankō =

Japanese scholar of Okinawan history and culture

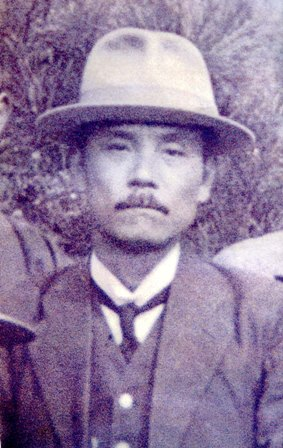
- Born: 20 March 1875; Shuri, Ryukyu Kingdom
- Died: 28 November 1933 (aged 58); Okinawa, Japan
- Occupation: historian
- Writing career
- Notable works: The history of Okinawan women One thousand year history of Okinawa

Majikina Ankō (真境名 安興; 20 May 1875 - 28 December 1933) was a Japanese scholar who specialized in the history of Okinawa. Alongside Iha Fuyū and Higashionna Kanjun, he was considered one of the pioneers of modern Okinawan studies.

== Biography ==
Majikina entered Okinawa Middle School in 1891, and was a schoolmate of Iha Fuyū. He led a strike and was dismissed from school, later he received pardon and was allowed to return to school. He worked as a journalist after graduation. He became a secretary of Shuri, Okinawa in 1898. In 1924, he was appointed the director of Okinawa Prefectural Library.

His famous works were The history of Okinawan women (沖縄女性史, 1919) and One thousand year history of Okinawa (沖縄一千年史, 1923). He also wrote Five great men of Ryukyu Kingdom (琉球の五偉人, 1916) together with Iha Fuyū.
