= Higashionna Kanjun =

Japanese historian (1882–1963)

Higashionna Kanjun 東恩納 寛惇
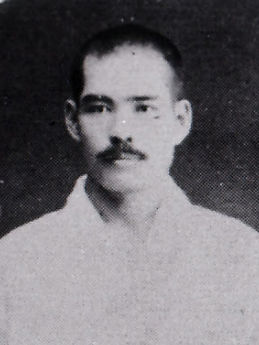
- Higashionna Kanjun
- Born: 14 October 1882 Naha, Okinawa Prefecture, Japan
- Died: 24 January 1963 (aged 80) Tokyo, Japan
- Occupation: Scholar and writer (Okinawan culture and history)

Higashionna Kanjun (東恩納 寛惇) also Higaonna Kanjun (14 October 1882–24 January 1963) was an Okinawan scholar who specialized in the history of Okinawa. Alongside Iha Fuyū and Majikina Ankō, he is considered one of the pioneers of modern Okinawan studies. After reading Japanese history at Tokyo Imperial University, where he wrote his dissertation on the approach of the Shimazu clan towards the Ryūkyū Kingdom, his subsequent career included posts at Hosei University and Takushoku University and travels in Southeast Asia and India. His extensive body of writings, collected as Higashionna Kanjun zenshū (東恩納寬惇全集) in ten volumes, centre around Ryukyuan history and culture, personal and place names, and classics such as the Omoro Sōshi. His private collection of documents and historical materials, numbering some 3,384 items, is preserved as the Higashionna Kanjun Collection at Okinawa Prefectural Library.

== See also ==
- List of Cultural Properties of Japan - writings (Okinawa)
- List of Cultural Properties of Japan - historical materials (Okinawa)
