= Satoshi Fukushima =

Japanese deafblind researcher and accessibility expert

- Born: 25 December 1962; Kobe
- Awards: Yoshikawa Eiji Cultural Award (1996)

Satoshi Fukushima (born 1962) is a Japanese researcher and advocate for people with disabilities. Blind since age nine and deaf from the age of eighteen, Fukushima was the first deafblind student to earn a degree from a Japanese university when he graduated from Tokyo Metropolitan University in 1987. Fukushima leads the Barrier-Free Laboratory, part of the Research Center for Advanced Science and Technology at the University of Tokyo; the research done by members of the lab's staff focuses on accessibility.

== Early life and education ==
Satoshi Fukushima was born in Kobe on 25 December 1962. Fukushima developed an eye infection when he was five months old, and lost vision in his right eye when he was three years old. He lost the sight in his left eye at age nine due to sympathetic ophthalmia. After becoming fully blind, he transferred from a regular school to a school for the blind affiliated with the University of Tsukuba. His hearing decreased until he was deaf at age eighteen.

Fukushima struggled to communicate, and he found the most difficult part of his deafblindness was being unable to share his thoughts with his family and friends. In collaboration with his mother Reiko, he developed finger braille (yubitenji), a tactile communication method. In finger braille, the index, middle and ring fingers are used to mimic a Braille keyboard; finger braille users or interpreters tap onto both hands of the deafblind person.

In 1983, he passed the entrance examination for Tokyo Metropolitan University, becoming the first deafblind student to enroll in a university in Japan. Fukushima became the first deafblind person to graduate from college in Japan in 1987. He completed the doctoral course in education in March 1992 from Tokyo Metropolitan University, withdrawing due to the expiration of the time limit for earning credits. In 2008, he earned his Ph.D. from the University of Tokyo.

== Research and advocacy ==
From April 1992 to March 1994, Fukushima was a special researcher for the Japan Society for the Promotion of Science. He became an assistant professor in the Department of Social Science and Humanities at Tokyo Metropolitan University in 1996, and later that year began working as an associate professor in the education department of Kanazawa University. He remained at Kanazawa University through March 2001.

He became the first deafblind person to teach at the University of Tokyo in 2001. He was hired as an associate professor to create a new academic program in disabilities studies. The proposal to establish the new program faced mild resistance, but the faculty voted unanimously to hire Fukushima. Fukushima heads the Barrier-free Laboratory, a unit consisting primarily of researchers with disabilities who conduct studies aiming to make people and society more accessible.

Fukushima is the director of the Japan Deafblind Association, an organization which provides information, training, and support to deafblind people and their families. He has also served as a representative to the World Federation of the Deafblind.

== Recognition ==
Fukushima and his mother Reiko Fukushima won the Yoshikawa Eiji Cultural Award in 1996. In 2003, Fukushima was one of twenty-nine "Asian Heroes" selected by Time Asia magazine. He was honored with the Kazuo Homma Cultural Award by the Japan Braille Library in 2015.

Fukushima's biographical papers are located in the archives of the Rochester Institute of Technology.

== Selected publications ==
- Watanabe sō no uchūbito - yubi tenji de kōshin suru hibi (Soboku Publishing, 1995) ISBN 4915513394
- Mōrōsha to shite ikite : yubitenji ni yoru komyunikēshon no fukkatsu to saisei (Tōkyō-to Chiyoda-ku : Akashi Shoten, 2011) ISBN 9784750334332
- Boku no inochi wa kotoba to tomo ni aru : 9-sai de shitsumei 18-sai de chōryoku mo ushinatta boku ga Tōdai kyōju to nari, kangaete kita koto (Tōkyō : Chichi Shuppansha, 2015) ISBN 9784800910721
- Kotoba wa hikari (Tenri-shi : Tenrikyōdōyūsha, 2016) ISBN 9784807305988
