= 1947 Saga gubernatorial election =

Election for Governor of Saga Prefecture

| 5 April 1947 | 1951 → |
| Nominee | Gen'ichi Okimori | Ryūzaburō Taku | Junji Yanai |
| Party | Independent | Independent | Independent |
| Popular vote | 175,095 | 51,293 | 48,590 |
| Nominee | Morio Tozawa | Hironobu Honjō | Takuta Ikeda |
| Party | Independent | Independent | Independent |
| Popular vote | 45,276 | 23,322 | 11,794 |
| Nominee | Haruo Shinohara |
| Party | Independent |
| Popular vote | 4,848 |
Governor before election
Kuniharu Kanayama
Independent
Elected Governor
Gen'ichi Okimori
Independent

A gubernatorial election was held on 5 April 1947 to elect the Governor of Saga Prefecture. Former governor Gen'ichi Okimori defeated six other candidates to become the prefecture's first democratically elected governor.

== Candidates ==
- Gen'ichi Okimori - former Governor of Saga Prefecture (1945–1946), age 49
- Baron Ryūzaburō Taku of the Go-Taku clan - Member of the House of Peers, age 47
- Junji Yanai - former Governor of Taipei (later Member of the House of Representatives), age 51
- Morio Tozawa - former Governor of Saga Prefecture (1946–1947), age 47
- Hironobu Honjō (本城広信, Honjō Hironobu) - author with two works catalogued in the National Diet Library, age 40
- Takuta Ikeda (池田沢太, Ikeda Takuta), age 53
- Haruo Shinohara (篠原 春雄, Shinohara Haruo), age 42

== Results ==
1947 Saga gubernationl election
| Party | Candidate | Votes | % | ±% |
|---|---|---|---|---|
| Independent | Gen'ichi Okimori | 175,095 | | |
| Independent | Ryūzaburō Taku | 51,293 | | |
| Independent | Junji Yanai | 48,590 | | |
| Independent | Morio Tozawa | 45,276 | | |
| Socialist | Hironobu Honjō | 23,322 | | |
| Independent | Takuta Ikeda | 11,794 | | |
| Independent | Haruo Shinohara | 4,848 | | |
