= Akita Prefectural Library =

- 秋田県立図書館

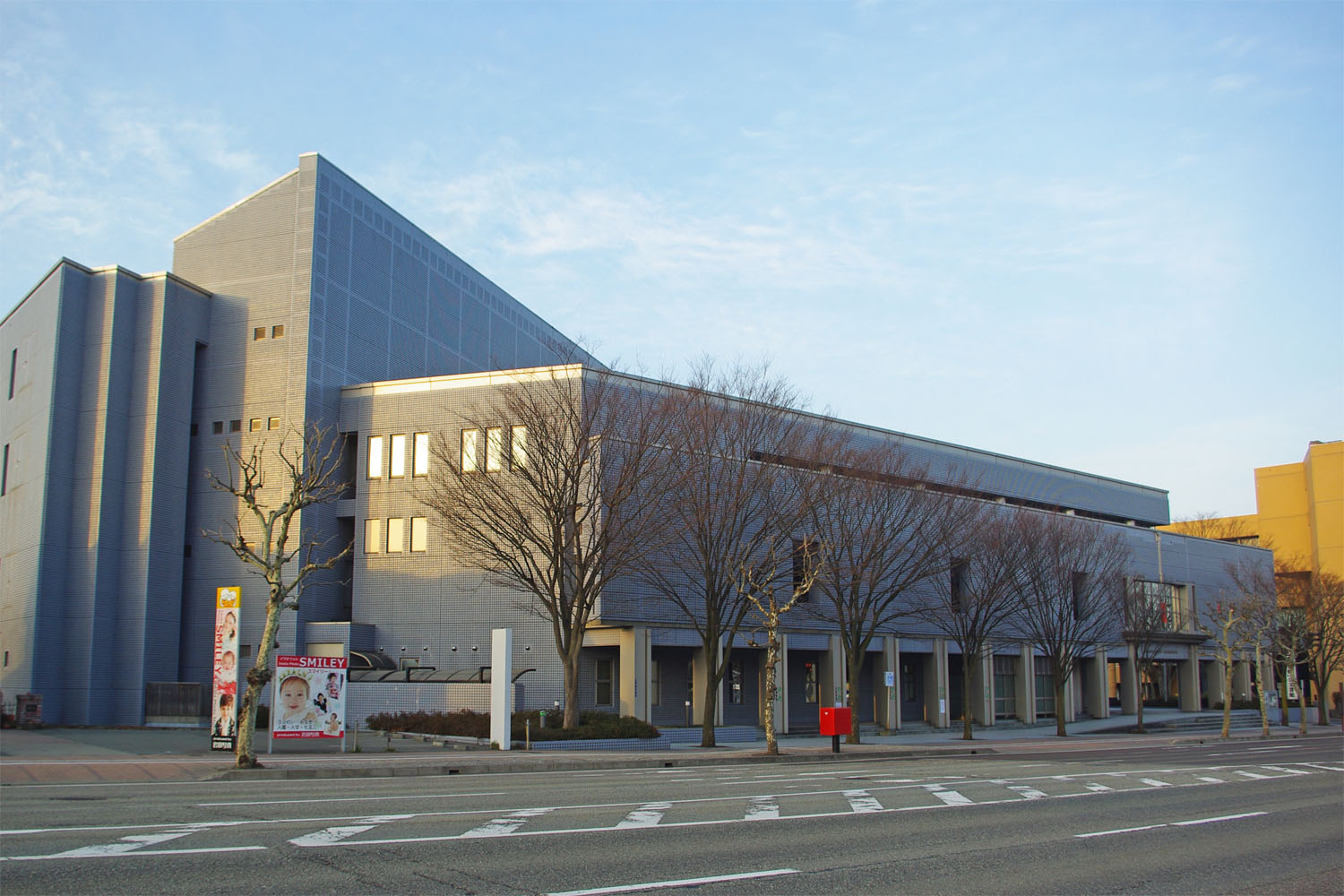
- 39°43′5.9″N 140°5′36.6″E
- Location: Akita, Akita, Japan
- Type: Prefectural library
- Established: 1899
- Branches: 1

Collection
- Items collected: books, journals, newspapers, maps
- Size: 805,000 items
- Criteria for collection: Publications issued in Japan

Access and use
- Population served: General public

Other information
- Website: apl.pref.akita.jp
- Building details

Technical details
- Floor area: 12,445.7 m^{2}

Design and construction
- Architect: MHS Planners, Architects & Engineers

Akita Prefectural Library (秋田県立図書館, Akita Kenritsu Toshokan) opened in Akita, Akita Prefecture, Japan in 1899, and it is one of the oldest libraries in the country. The facilities reopened in a new building in 1993. The collection numbers some 805,000 items in 2012. 441,642 published materials are available online through the library's digital archive. This was done through the AMLAD digital archiving service that connects it to other participating facilities in the prefecture.

== Gallery ==
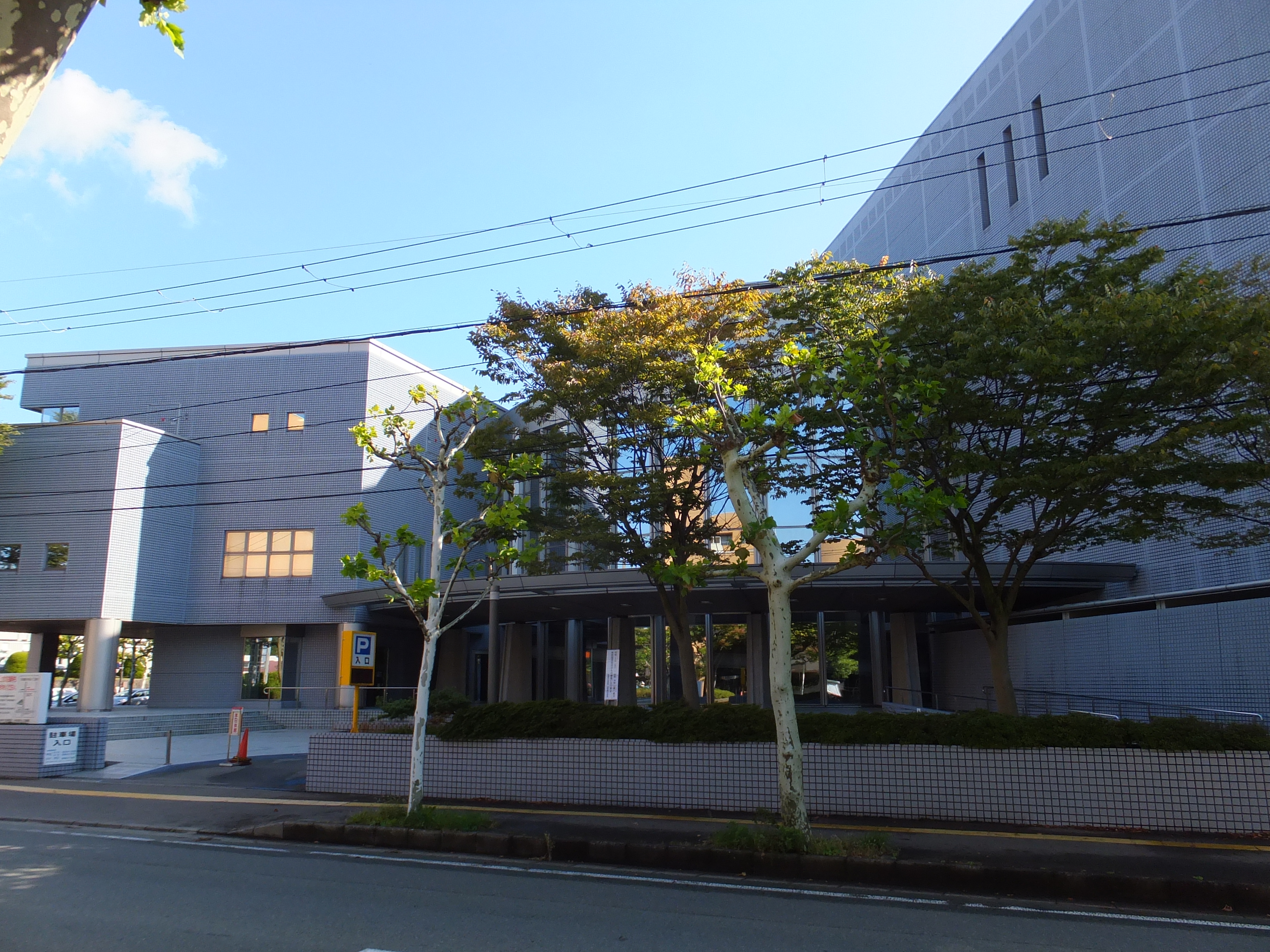

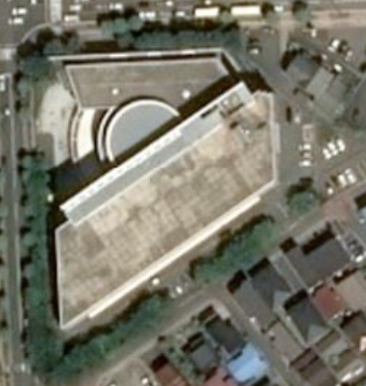
Satellite view

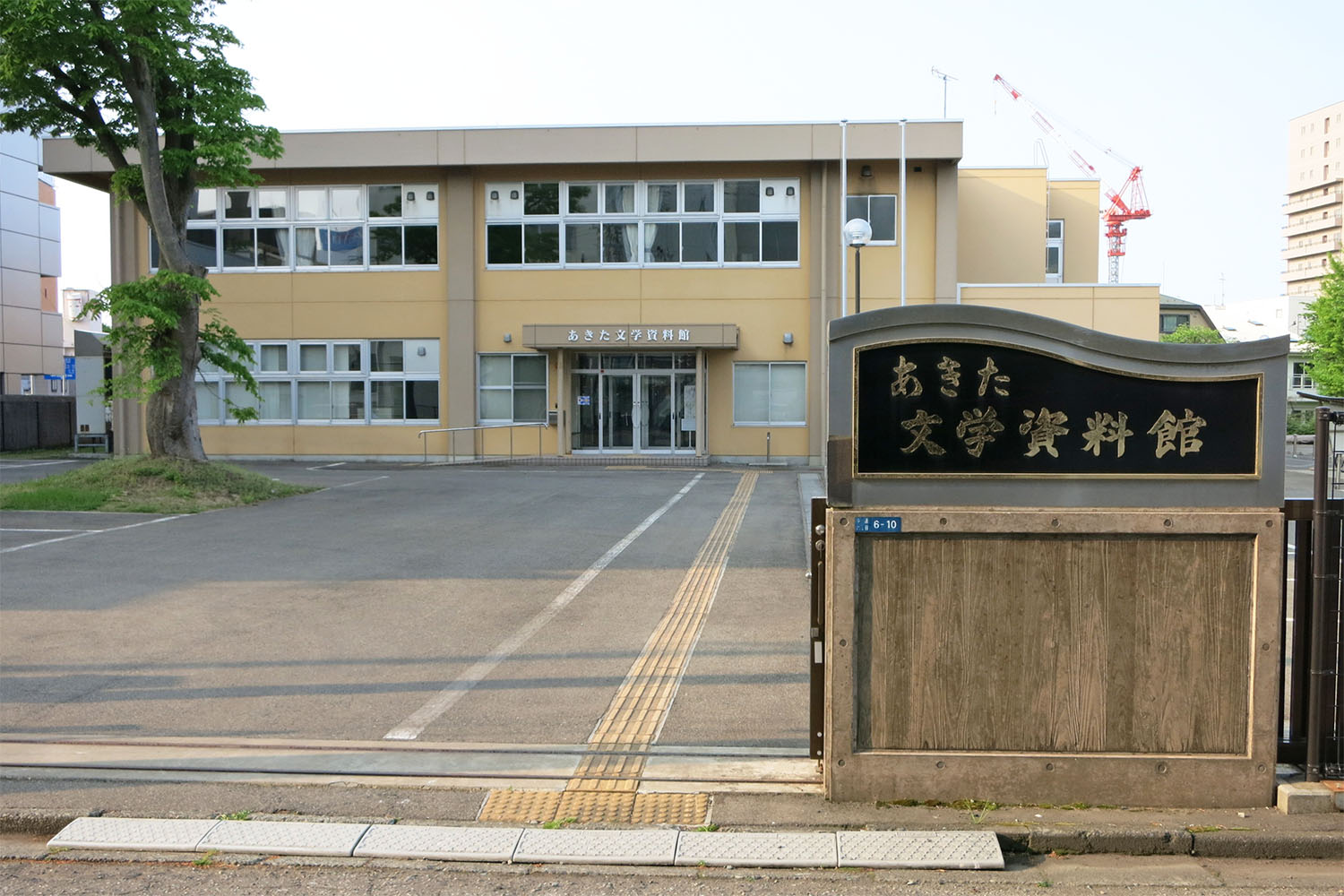
Branch

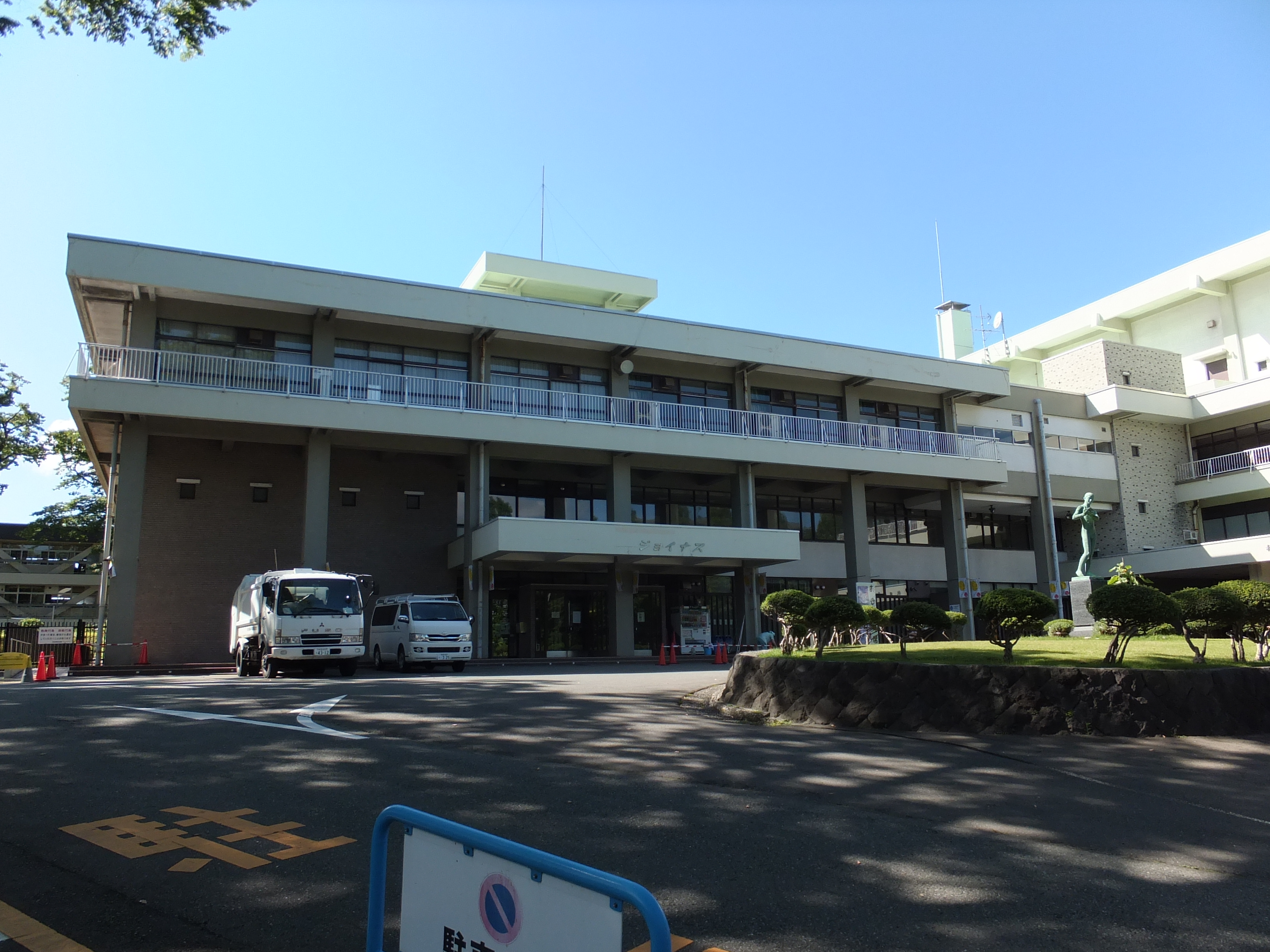
Former building

== See also ==
- List of libraries in Japan
- Akita Prefectural Museum

== Location map ==
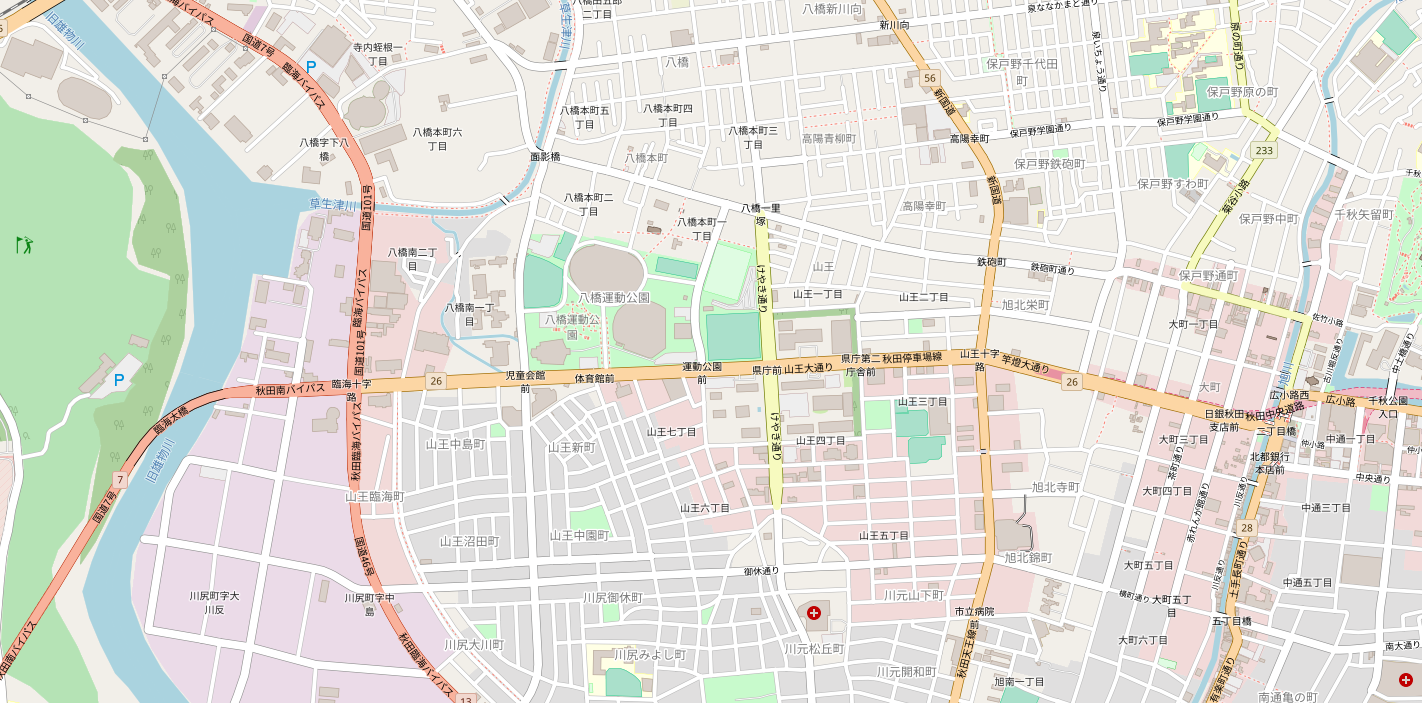
