= International Library of Children's Literature =

Library in Tokyo, Japan

- 国際子ども図書館
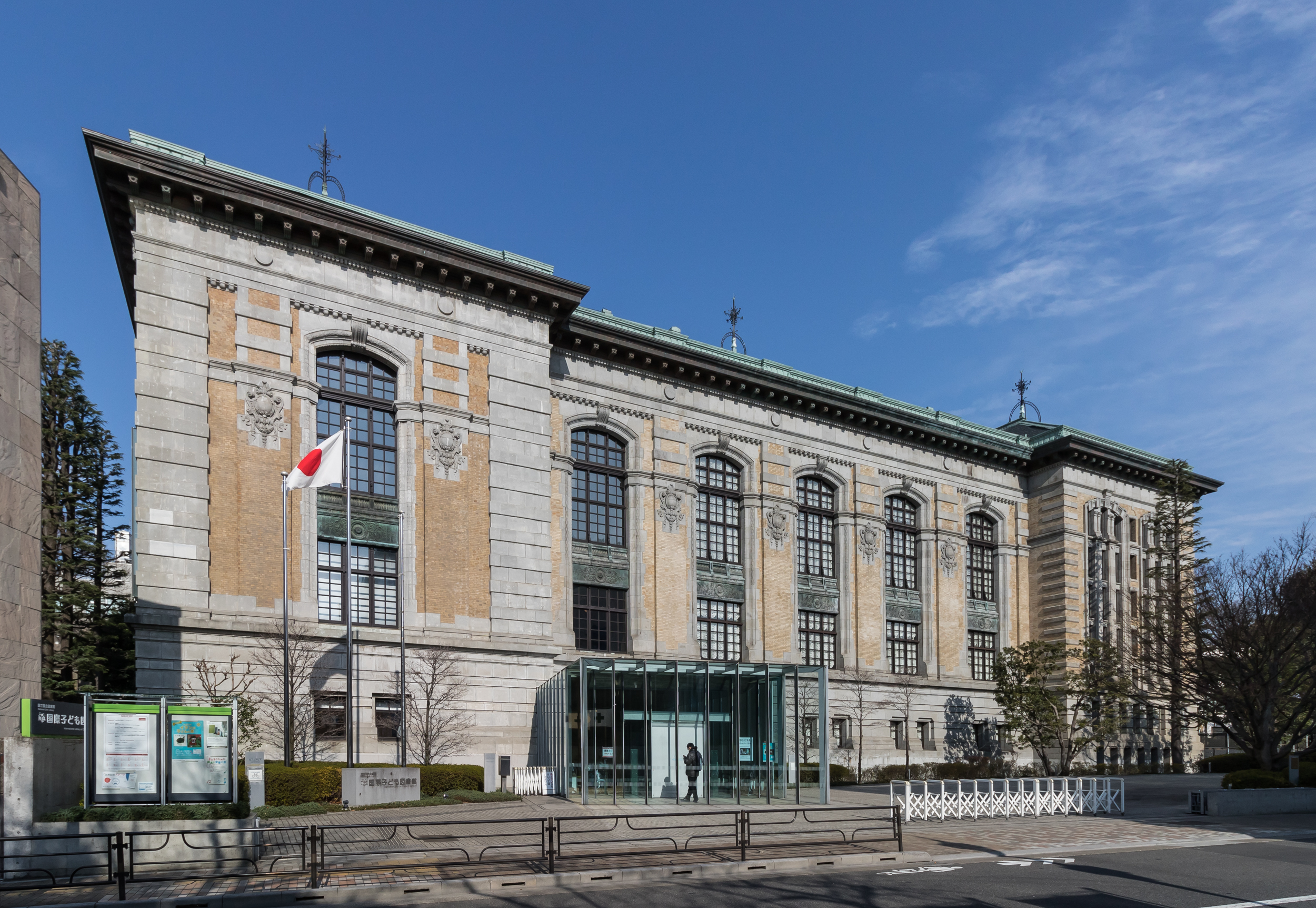
- Location: Taitō, Tokyo, Japan
- Type: Children's libraries
- Established: 2000 (26 years ago)

Collection
- Size: 346,562 (2013)

Other information
- Website: www.kodomo.go.jp/index.html

The International Library of Children's Literature (国際子ども図書館, Kokusai Kodomo Toshokan) is a branch of the National Diet Library in Japan, which provides library services specializing in children's books. It was established in 2000 as Japan's first national library specializing in children's books.

It is the center and international hub of children's books-related library services in Japan, including the collection, preservation and provision of children's books and literature related to children's books inside and outside Japan. The facility is located in Ueno Park, Taito-ku, Tokyo, and uses the former Imperial Library building built in 1906.

== Buildings ==
The original building, known as the "Brick Building", designed by Kuru Masamichi, Okada Tokitarō, and Mimizu Hideo (真水英夫), dates from 1906; it was enlarged in 1929 and again in the Heisei era, with repair and restoration work taking place most recently in 2002 and 2016. It has been placed on the register of Tokyo's Select Historic Buildings by the Tokyo Metropolitan Government, in accordance with the 2006 Tokyo Landscape Regulations. The new "Arch Building", to designs by Tadao Ando and Nikken Sekkei, dates from 2015.
