= Ishikawa Prefectural Library =

Prefectural library in Ishikawa Prefecture of Japan

- 石川県立図書館

General information
- Location: 2 Chome-43-1 Kodatsuno, Kanazawa, Ishikawa 920-0942, Japan
- Coordinates: 36.54887847683963°N 136.68086921542616°E

Design and construction
- Architects: Mitsuru Senda, Environmental Design Institute

The Ishikawa Prefectural Library (石川県立図書館, Ishikawa Kenritsu Toshokan) is a four-floor, amphitheater-shaped public library in Kanazawa, the capital of Ishikawa Prefecture of Japan. Designed by the Environmental Design Institute, it has a capacity of 300,000 books, with 70,000 of them shelved cover-forward in its atrium.

In 2025, the library reported a million visitors in the 2024 fiscal year, a 16% increase from its opening fiscal year, making it the most visited prefectural library in all of Japan for two years in a row. The same year, it surpassed 3 million total visitors since its opening. It has also received numerous accolades including an iF Design Award in 2024, as well as an Architectural Arts and Crafts Association of Japan Award, and a Chubu Architecture Award.

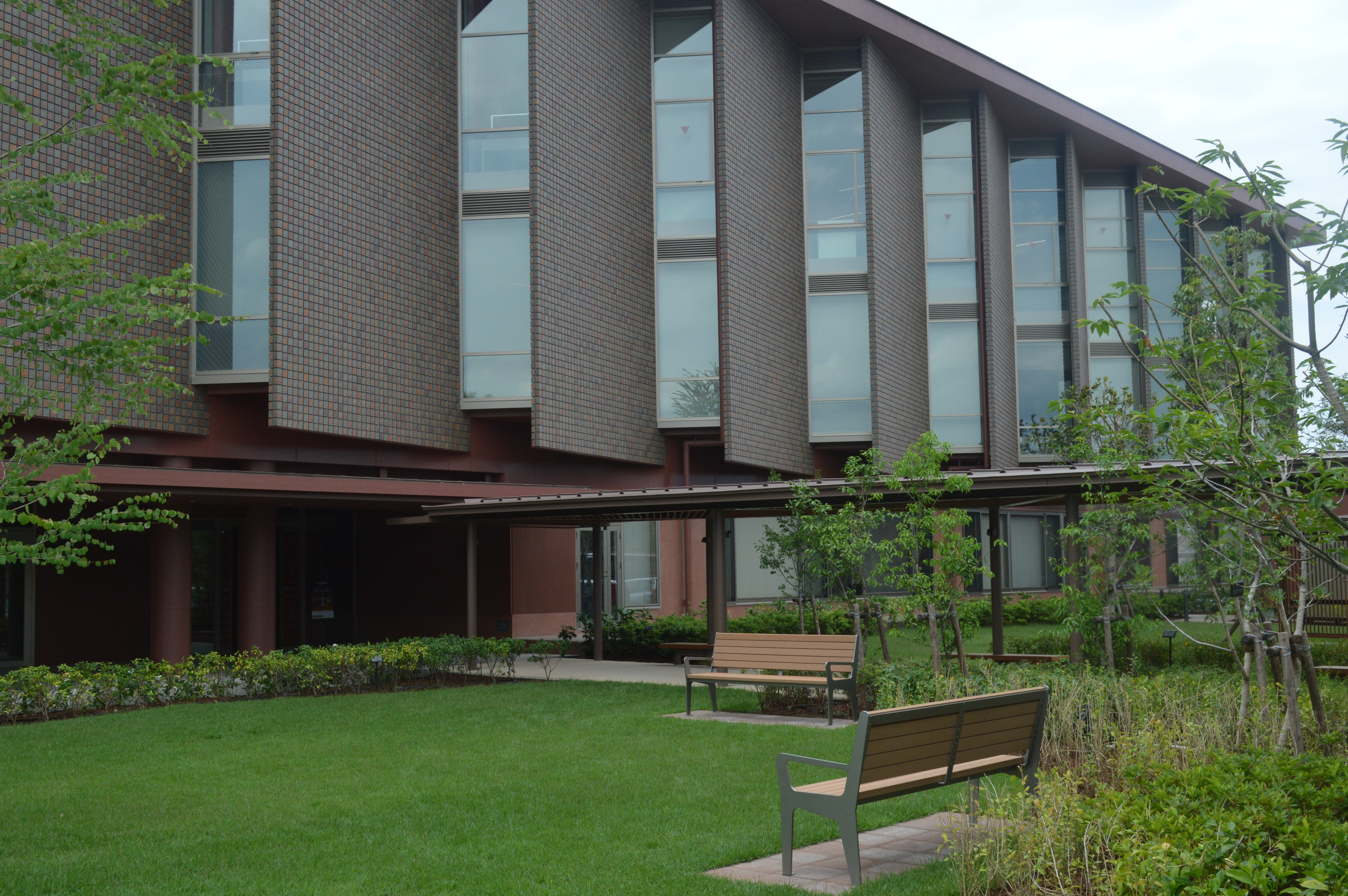
Ishikawa Prefectural Library

== History ==
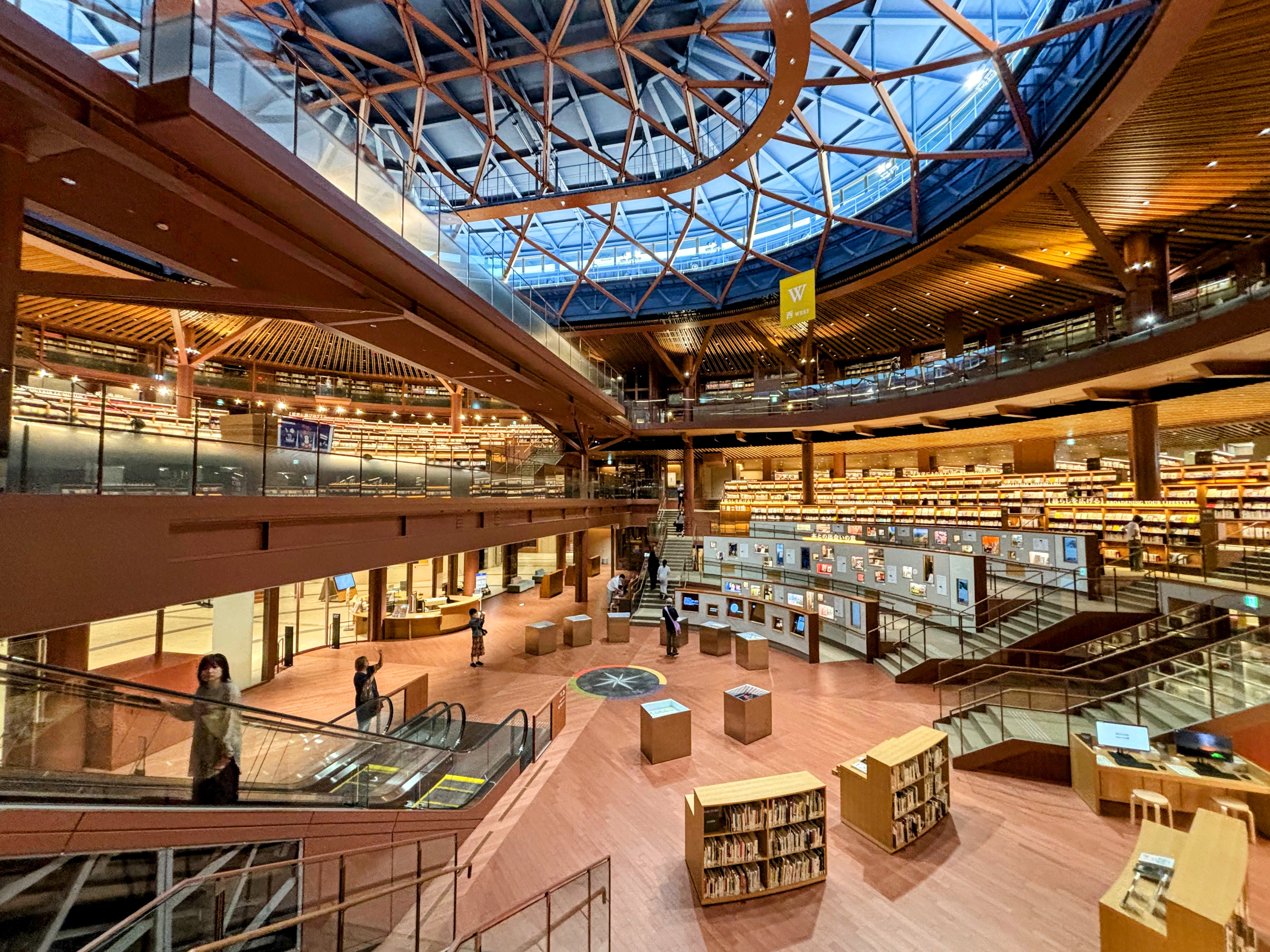
The main hall of Ishikawa Prefectural Library

The old Ishikawa Prefectural Library was formerly located by Kenroku-en, having been built in 1912. Back then, it held documents of the Kaga Domain and stood in what was formerly known as the Hokuriku region, a part of Japan known for intellectualism. However, it became "run-down" and "increasingly cramped" coming into the twenty-first century.

In 2017, a contest was held for design proposals on a new Ishikawa Prefectural Library. Mitsuru Senda and the designers of the Environmental Design Institute won, intending to create a library that not only held books but hosted cultural activities, preserved the heritage of Ishikawa, and served as a third space of sorts for residents.

As a result, a new Ishikawa Prefectural Library was built and then opened in July 2022 three kilometers away where Kanazawa University's College of Engineering used to be. In addition to its capacity of 300,000 books, it also provides over 500 seats, as well as numerous venues for hosting talks, workshops, and handicraft-making.

Upon its opening, the Ishikawa Prefectural Library held a "special science exhibition" in collaboration with the National Museum of Nature and Science to showcase the skeletons of dinosaurs, prehistoric fossils, and informational panels. It has also hosted events for anime, including Love Live!, as well as relief events in wake of the 2024 Noto earthquake.
