= Kanagawa Prefectural Library =

Library in Yokohama, Kanagawa, Japan

Coordinates: 35.4512°N 139.6253°E

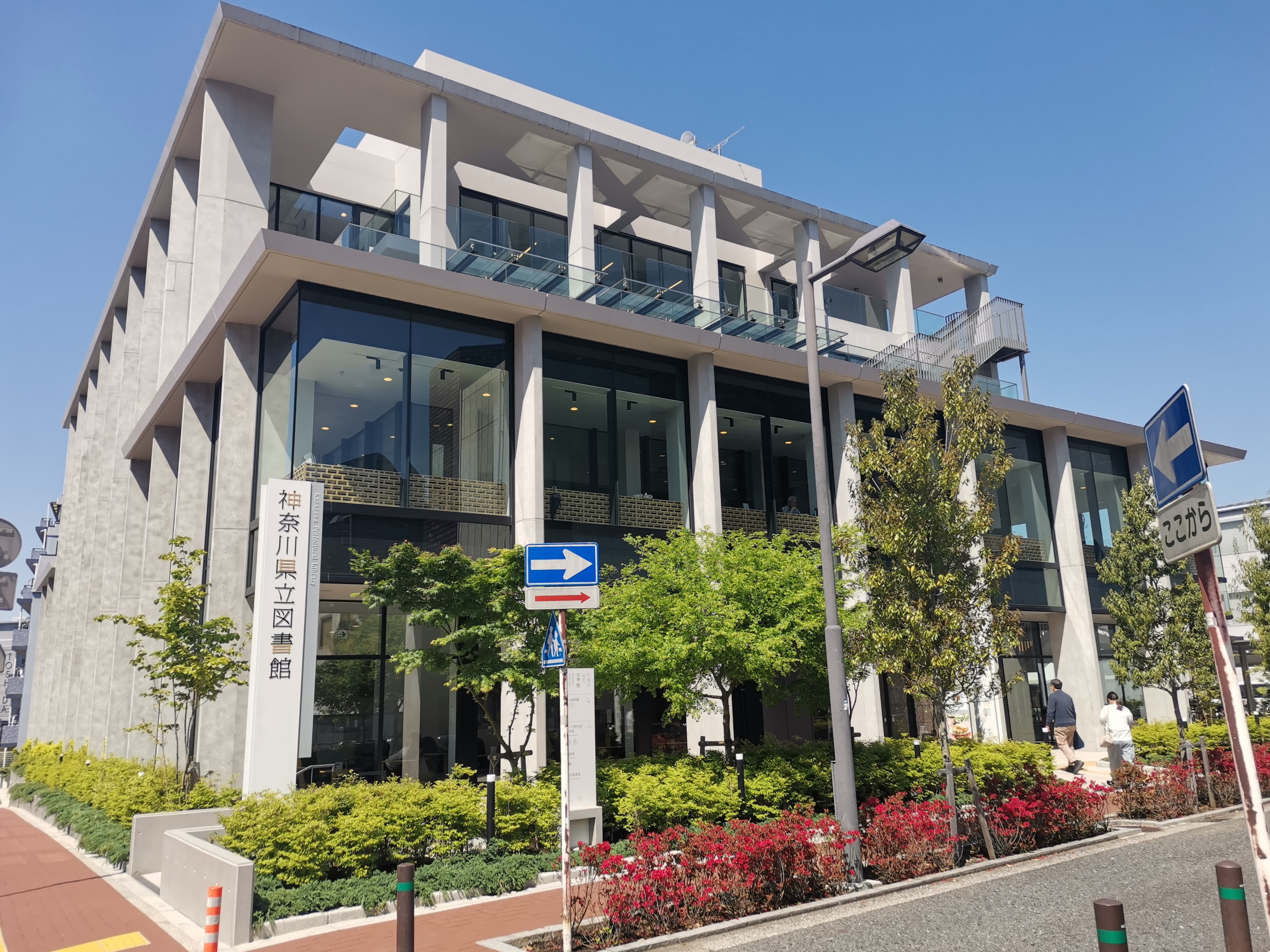
Main building

Kanagawa Prefectural Library (神奈川県立図書館, Kanagawa Kenritsu Toshokan) is the prefectural public library system for Kanagawa, Japan.

The Kanagawa Prefectural Library has two branches. The Yokohama branch is the main library, located in Momijigaoka of Nishi Ward, Yokohama City. It mainly collects social science and human science books. The Yokohama branch holds 975,526 volumes. The Yokohama branch was opened in November 1954.

The Kawasaki branch opened on January 12, 1959. Mainly collect natural science books.
