= Okinawa Prefectural Library =

- 沖縄県立図書館
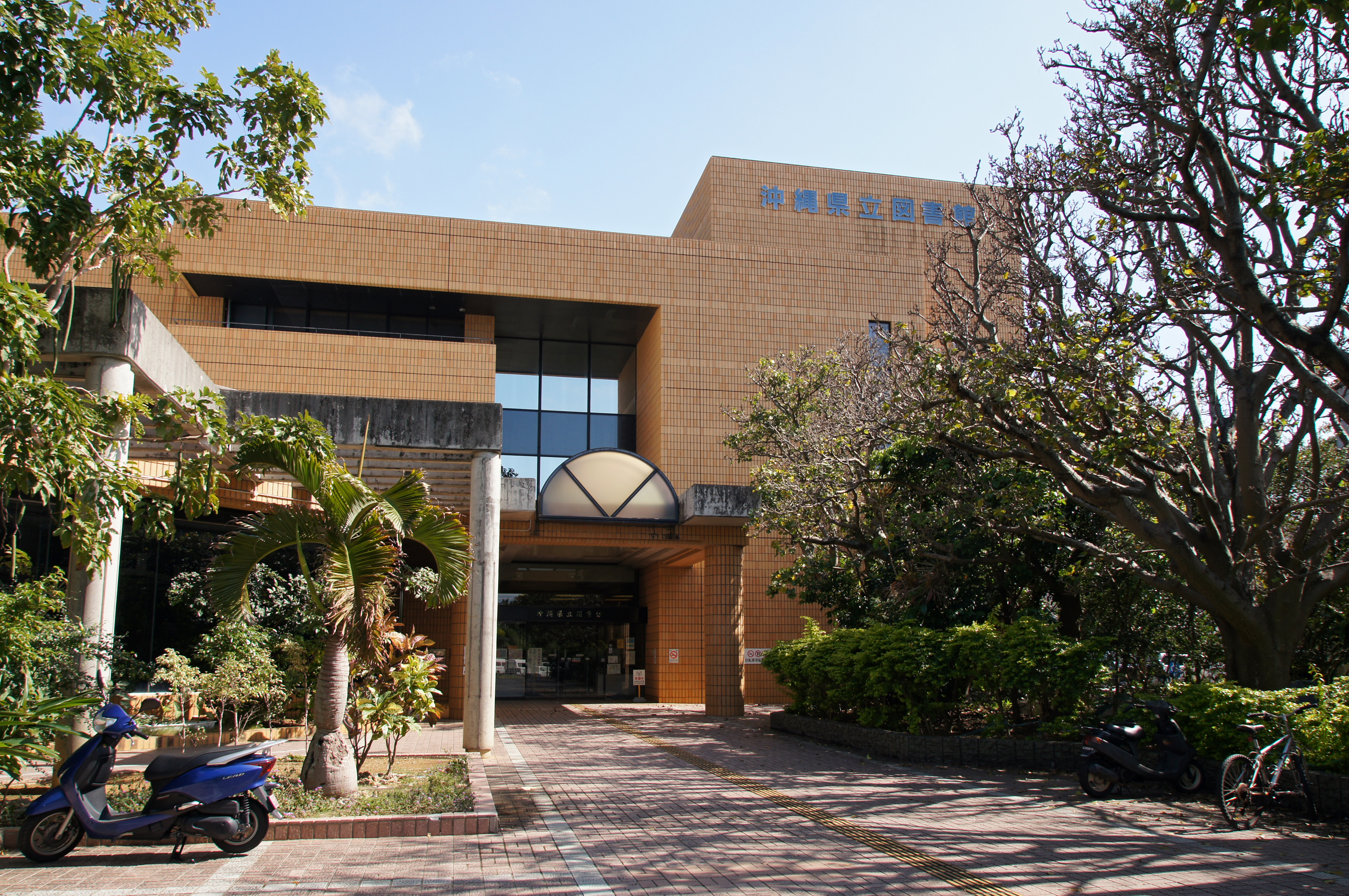

General information
- Location: 1-2-16 Yorimiya, Naha, Okinawa Prefecture, Japan
- Coordinates: 26°12′30″N 127°41′39″E
- Opened: 1 August 1910

Website
- Official website

Okinawa Prefectural Library (沖縄県立図書館, Okinawa Kenritsu Toshokan) opened in Naha, Okinawa Prefecture, Japan in 1910. Iha Fuyū was the first director. The library reopened in a new building in 1983. As of 2016, the collection numbers some 708,000 items, of which almost a fifth are on open access.

== See also ==
- List of libraries in Japan
- Okinawa Prefectural Museum
- Okinawa Prefectural Archives
