= Japan Braille Library =

Private library in Tokyo, Japan

Coordinates: 35°42′39.218″N 139°42′16.855″E

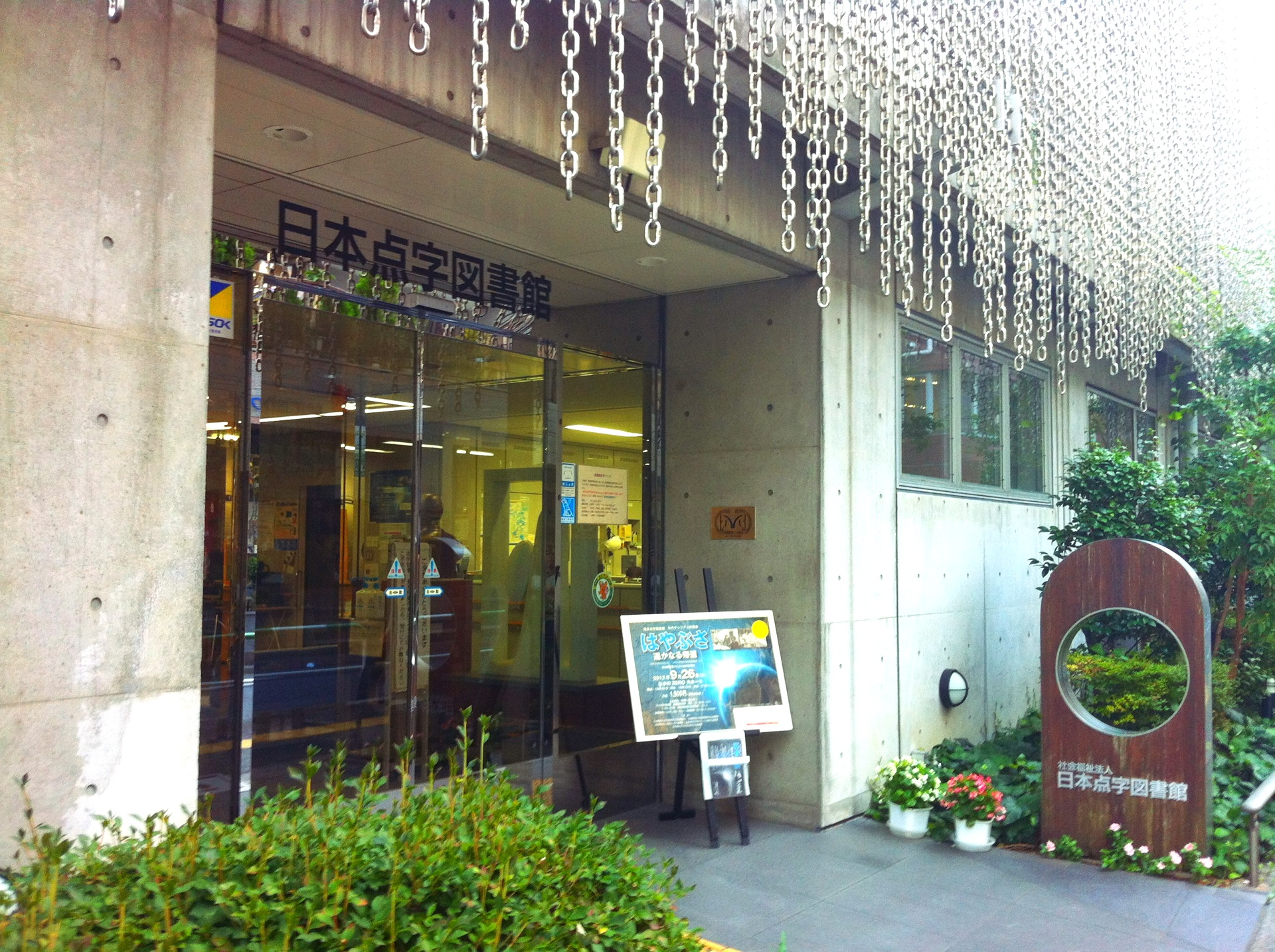
Main entrance

Japan Braille Library (日本点字図書館, Nippon Tenji Toshokan) is a special private library in Tokyo, Japan, serving individuals who are unable to read standard printed material, and those who research the field of visual impairment. JBL is one of the biggest and oldest libraries for the blind in Japan. The library's collection includes about 81,000 braille books (23,000 titles), 210,000 talking books (24,000 titles), and various documents concerning the blind and braille. JBL also provides a braille transcription service, a braille printing service, a recording service, digital library services, PC training programs, braille training programs, and sells about 1,200 products for the blind. The library's services now extend beyond Japan, providing braille textbooks and computer training to developing Asian nations.

== Chronology ==
- 1940: November 10, Japan library for the blind is founded in Tokyo by a blind man, Kazuo Honma (1915-2003).
- 1945: Is destroyed in air raids.
- 1948: Rises from the ashes of war, and is renamed Japan Braille Library.
- 1955: Sponsored by Ministry of Welfare, undertakes the publication of braille books.
- 1961: Sponsored by Ministry of Welfare, undertakes the production of talking books.
- 1966: Opens a shop of products for the blind.
- 1994: Initiates the support project for the blind in Asia.
- 1999: Starts digital talking book (DAISY book) service.
- 2004: Starts the broadband network delivery service of DAISY books ”Biblio-net".
- 2007: Initiates the production of audio guide for DVD movies.

== Services & Projects ==
- Braille books lending
- Talking books (DAISY books, audio cassette books, audio CD books) lending
- Reference service
- Face-to-face reading service
- Braille transcription service
- Braille printing service
- Publication of braille books
- Recording service
- Production of talking books
- Production of audio guide for DVD movies
- Digital library service (broadband network delivery service of DAISY books)
- PC training programs
- Braille training programs
- Shop of the products for the blind
- Support project for the blind libraries in Asia

== See also ==
- Books for the Blind
- Audiobook
- Japanese Braille
