= National Diet Library =

National library in Japan

National Diet Library (NDL)
- 国立国会図書館 (Kokuritsu Kokkai Toshokan)

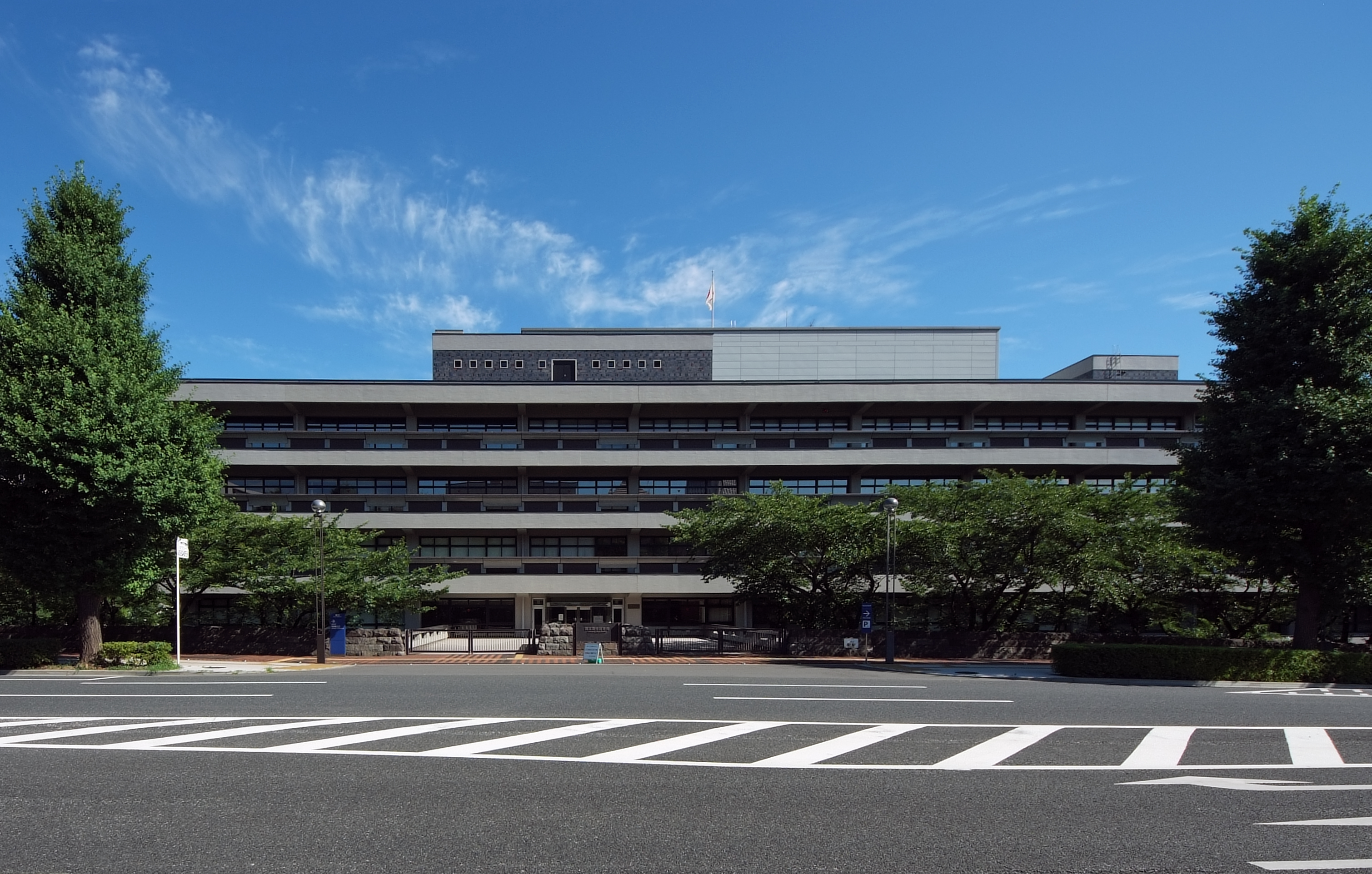
- Tokyo Main Library of the National Diet Library
- 35°40′42″N 139°44′39″E
- Location: Tokyo and Kyoto, Japan
- Type: National Library, Parliamentary Library
- Established: 1948 (78 years ago)
- Architects: Maekawa Associates, Architects & Engineers
- Reference to legal mandate: National Diet Library Law
- Branches: 27

Collection
- Items collected: Books, Journals, Newspapers, Electronic archives, Manuscripts, Official publications, Doctoral dissertations, Maps and Sheet music
- Size: 48,113,609 items (Key statistics of FY 2024)
- Criteria for collection: Publications issued in Japan, statutes and parliamentary documents, publications on Japan, reference material, material on science and technology, publications of international organizations and foreign governments, children's literature and related material, Asian works
- Legal deposit: Yes

Access and use
- Access requirements: 18 years old and above for the Tokyo Main Library and the Kansai-kan
- Population served: Members of the Diet and the general public.

Other information
- Budget: JP¥20,426M (FY2025) (approx. US$130.6M as of 2026)
- Director: Keiko Kurata (2026)
- Employees: 895 (as of April 2025)
- Website: www.ndl.go.jp/en/

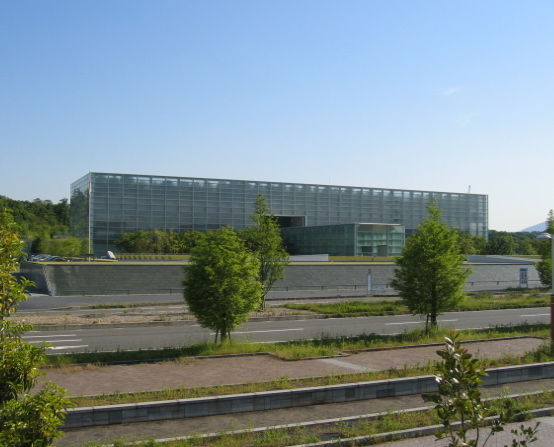
Kansai-kan of the National Diet Library

The National Diet Library (NDL) (国立国会図書館, Kokuritsu Kokkai Toshokan) is the national library of Japan and among the largest libraries in the world. It was established in 1948 for the purpose of assisting members of the National Diet of Japan (国会, Kokkai) in researching matters of public policy. The library is similar in purpose and scope to the United States Library of Congress.

The National Diet Library (NDL) consists of two main facilities in Tokyo and Kyoto, and several other branch libraries throughout Japan.

== History ==
The National Diet Library is the successor of three separate libraries: the library of the House of Peers, the library of the House of Representatives, both of which were established at the creation of Japan's Imperial Diet in 1890; and the Imperial Library, which had been established in 1872 under the jurisdiction of the Ministry of Education.

The Diet's power in pre-war Japan was limited, and its need for information was "correspondingly small." The original Diet libraries "never developed either the collections or the services which might have made them vital adjuncts of genuinely responsible legislative activity." Until Japan's defeat, moreover, the executive had controlled all political documents, depriving the people and the Diet of access to vital information. The U.S. occupation forces under General Douglas MacArthur deemed reform of the Diet library system to be an important part of the democratization of Japan after its defeat in World War II.

In 1946, each house of the Diet formed its own National Diet Library Standing Committee. Hani Gorō, a Marxist historian who had been imprisoned during the war for thought crimes and had been elected to the House of Councillors (the successor to the abolished House of Peers) after the war, spearheaded the reform efforts. Hani envisioned the new body as "both a 'citadel of popular sovereignty,'" and the means of realizing a "peaceful revolution." The Occupation officers responsible for overseeing library reforms reported that, although the Occupation was a catalyst for change, local initiative pre-existed the Occupation, and the successful reforms were due to dedicated Japanese like Hani.

The National Diet Library opened in June 1948 in the present-day State Guest-House (former Akasaka Detached Palace) with an initial collection of 100,000 volumes. The first Librarian of the Diet Library was the politician Tokujirō Kanamori. The philosopher Masakazu Nakai served as the first Vice Librarian. In 1949, the NDL merged with the National Library (previously called the Imperial Library) and became the only national library in Japan. At this time the collection gained an additional million volumes previously housed in the former National Library in Ueno.

In 1961, the NDL opened at its present location in Nagatachō, adjacent to the National Diet. In 1986, the NDL's Annex was completed to accommodate a combined total of 12 million books and periodicals. The Kansai-kan (the Kansai Library), which opened in October 2002 in the Kansai Science City (Seika Town, Sōraku County, Kyoto Prefecture), has a collection of 6 million items. In May 2002, the NDL opened a new branch, the International Library of Children's Literature, in the former building of the Imperial Library in Ueno. This branch contains some 400,000 items of children's literature from around the world.

Though the NDL's original mandate was to be a research library for the National Diet, the general public is the largest consumer of the library's services. In the fiscal year ending March 2004, for example, the library reported more than 250,000 reference inquiries; in contrast, it recorded only 32,000 requests for research from the National Diet.

In response to the coronavirus (COVID-19) pandemic, the NDL suspended library services to the public on March 5, 2020. The NDL reopened to the public on June 11, 2020, with a maximum of 200 visitors per day based on a lottery-style drawing, with prospective visitors being required to register beforehand for a chance to be selected. On June 22, 2023, this restriction was lifted.

== Main collection ==
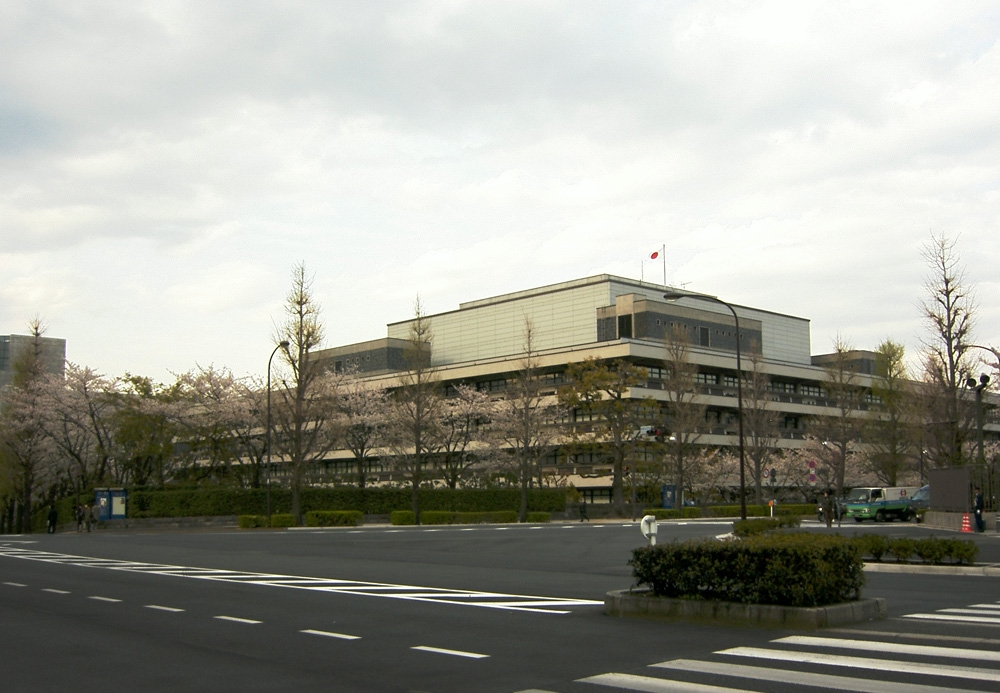
The National Diet Library

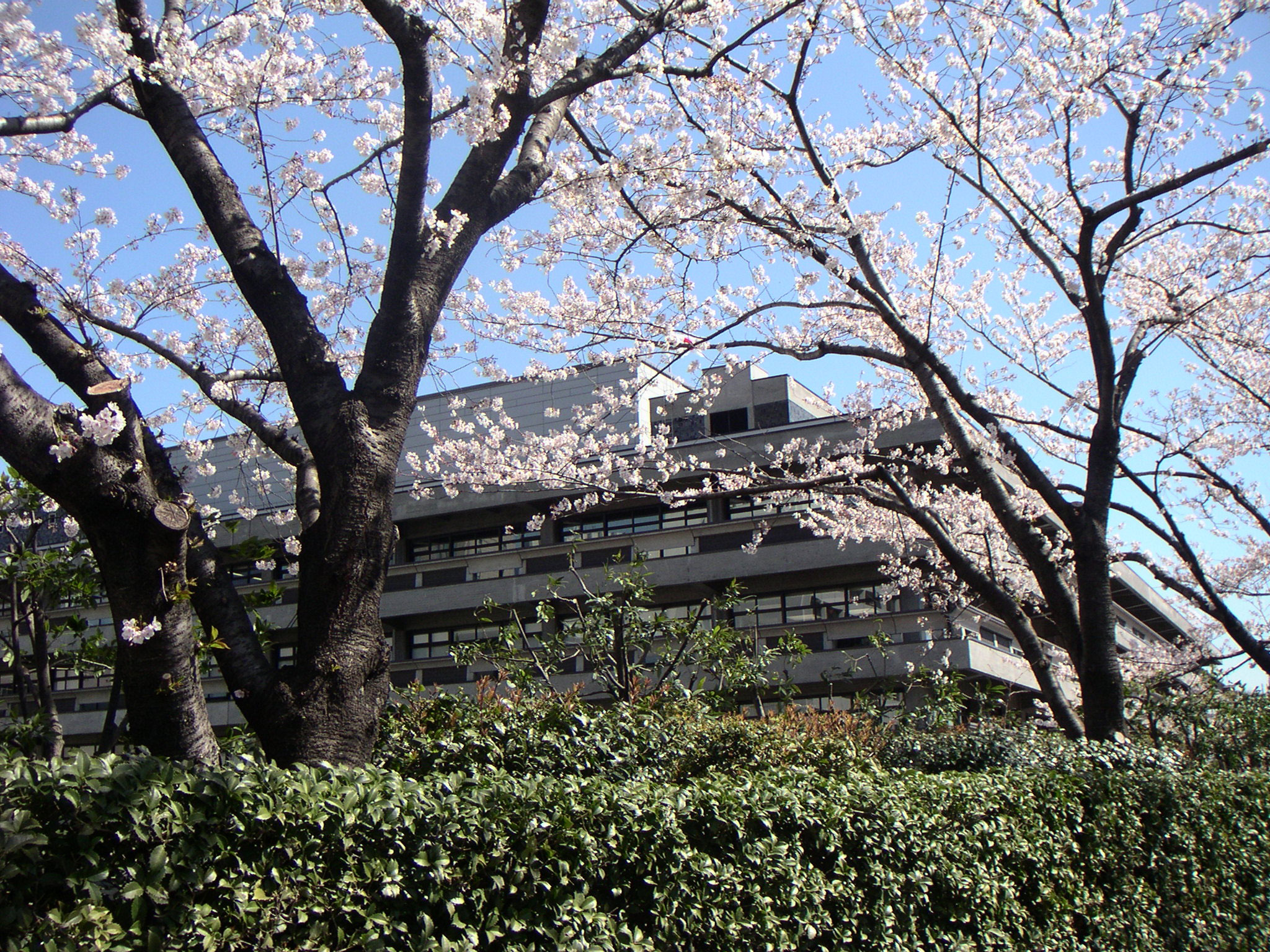
Main building in Tokyo

As Japan's national library, the NDL collects copies of all publications published in Japan. Moreover, because the NDL serves as a research library for Diet members, their staff, and the general public, it maintains an extensive collection of materials published in foreign languages on a wide range of topics.

== Important special collections ==
The NDL also has eight major specialized collections: Modern Political and Constitutional History; Materials Concerning the Postwar Occupation of Japan; Laws and Preliminary Records; Science and Technology; Maps; Music; Foreign Books About Japan; and Rare Books.

=== Modern political and constitutional history ===
The Modern Political and Constitutional History Collection comprises some 300,000 items related to Japan's political and legal modernization in the 19th century, including the original document archives of important Japanese statesmen from the latter half of the 19th century and the early 20th century like Itō Hirobumi, Iwakura Tomomi, Sanjō Sanetomi, Mutsu Munemitsu, Terauchi Masatake, and other influential figures from the Meiji (1868–1912) and Taishō (1912–1926) periods.

=== Materials concerning the postwar occupation of Japan ===
The NDL has an extensive microform collection of some 30 million pages of documents relating to the Occupation of Japan after World War II. This collection include the documents prepared by General Headquarters (GHQ) and the Supreme Commander of the Allied Powers (SCAP), the Far Eastern Commission (FEC), and the United States Strategic Bombing Survey Team. (The originals of these documents are in the possession of the United States National Archives.)

=== Laws and preliminary records ===
The Laws and Preliminary Records Collection consists of some 170,000 Japanese and 200,000 foreign-language documents concerning proceedings of the National Diet and the legislatures of some 70 foreign countries, and the official gazettes, statutes, judicial opinions, and international treaties pertaining to some 150 foreign countries.

=== Science and technology ===
The NDL maintains a collection of some 530,000 books and booklets and 2 million microform titles relating to the sciences. These materials include, among other things, foreign doctoral dissertations in the sciences, the proceedings and reports of academic societies, catalogues of technical standards, etc.

=== Maps ===
The NDL has a collection of approximately 440,000 maps of Japan and other countries, including the topographical, geological, and hydrological maps and charts dating back to the early Meiji period (1868–1912) and topographical maps of foreign countries.

=== Music ===
The NDL collects all phonographic recordings made in Japan, and presently holds a collection comprising 300,000 vinyl records and 200,000 compact disks.

=== Foreign books about Japan ===
Following the tradition established by the Imperial Library, the NDL collects foreign-language materials about Japan, including rare and ancient documents, such as reports of European missionaries visiting Japan in the 16th century.

=== Rare books and old materials ===
The Analects of Confucius in the collection of the National Diet Library has a back flyleaf with Nobukata's autograph provenance notes dated November of the 16th year of the Tenmon era (1547) and is clearly printed; therefore this seems to be a rare first edition. A sumptuous cover made of Nishijin brocade was put on the book in the Edo period.

The NDL houses the former Imperial Library's collection of Japanese language materials from the Edo period (1603–1867) and earlier periods. The major catalogues in this collection include: (1) some 6,000 documents relating to the Tokugawa shogunate (1603–1867), such as records of town magistrates, the shogunal Supreme Court, and the Jisha-bugyō (Commissioners of Shrines and Temples), as well as documents concerning the succession of shōguns; (2) the Itō Bunko and Shirai Bunko, consisting of 8,000 handwritten and woodblock printed books dating from the Edo and Meiji periods and concerning Japanese medicine; and (3) the Shinjo Bunko, consisting of 11,000 examples of pre-modern writings on astronomy and calendars, in addition to ancient Chinese works on the Qing dynasty, genealogy, and local history.

== National Diet Library buildings ==
=== The Kansai-Kan ===
Kansai-kan (Kansai Library), which opened in Kyoto Prefecture in 2002, is the second facility of the NDL.

The NDL has transferred the following collections to the Kansai-kan: most western periodicals; books and other materials in non-Japanese Asian languages; certain scientific and technological materials (technical reports, papers of foreign academic societies, catalogs of Japanese and foreign technical standards, foreign doctoral dissertations, and conference proceedings in Western languages); scientific research reports compiled under grants from the Ministry of Education, Culture, Sports, Science and Technology; Japanese doctoral dissertations; and books on tape.

== National Diet Library online resources ==
The National Diet Library has in recent years compiled a detailed website in both Japanese and English. Its online databases consist of the National Diet Library Online Public Access Catalog (NDL-OPAC), National Diet Library Digital Collections and the Minutes of the Imperial Diet and National Diet.

=== National Diet Library Online Public Access Catalog (NDL-OPAC) ===
The NDL provides an Online Public Access Catalog (OPAC), by which users can search the NDL's entire collection from anywhere in the world in either English or Japanese. Using OPAC to identify sources and catalog numbers, overseas users may obtain certain materials from the NDL through interlibrary loan. In addition, the NDL provides a fee-based reproduction service for scholars residing overseas. As of June 2017 NDL-OPAC is planned to end at the end of December 2017 and new online services will be launched.

=== National Diet Library Digital Collections ===
NDL Digital Collections provinces various online materials such as rare books, audio-visual materials and the materials whose copyrights has expired. The contents consisting of Digital Library from the Meiji Era and Rare Books Image Database (to be mentioned later) are now availablable on NDL Digital Collections. NDL Digitalized Contents was renamed to be NDL Digital Collections in 2014.

=== Digital Library from the Meiji Era ===
One of the most important features of the NDL's website is the Digital Library of the Meiji Era (近代デジタルライブラリー, Kindai dejitaru raiburarii; lit. Recent Age Digital Library). The Digital Library is the digital descendant of the Maruzen Meiji Microfilm, the product of an ambitious project to microfilm the NDL's entire collection of Meiji era books, a collection of some 60,000 volumes. The digital library contains actual images of these works, which are divided into ten main categories based on Nippon Decimal Classification (NDC) : (0) general (総記, sōki); (1) philosophy (哲学, tetsugaku); (2) history (歴史, rekishi); (3) social sciences (社会科学, shakai kagaku); (4) natural sciences (自然科学, shizen kagaku); (5) engineering and manufacturing (工学・工業, kōgaku/kōgyō); (6) industry (産業, sangyō); (7) arts and athletics (芸術・体育, geijutsu/taiiku); (8) language (語学, gogaku); and (9) literature (文学, bungaku). The images are not coded, so text searches are not possible; however, Japanese-language searches for the title, author, publisher, subject, and table of contents of the works in the database are possible. Meiji period periodicals are not included in this collection. Digital Library from the Meiji Era was merged into NDL Digital Collections in 2015.

=== Rare Books Image Database ===
The NDL's website also contains the Rare Books Image Database (貴重書画像データベース, kichōsho gazō dētabēsu) a collection of digital images from 37,000 illustrated books published before the Edo Period. Japanese-language searches by title, author, and call-number are possible in this database. Rare Books Image Database was integrated into NDL Digitalized Contents (now NDL Digital Collections) in 2012.

=== Minutes of the Imperial Diet and National Diet ===
The NDL provides a database of the minutes of both the Imperial Diet and the National Diet, the only one of the NDL's online database that is full-text searchable. All minutes from the National Diet's inception in May 1947 through the present are searchable online. At present, only minutes from the last two (91st and 92nd) sessions of the Imperial Diet (November 1946 through May 1947) are available.

=== Japan Search ===
Japan Search is a web portal launched on 25 August 2020 and operated by the NDL for integrated searches across multiple databases hosted by the various partner organizations. As of March 2023, the service worked with 38 aggregators and drew on over 28 million items of data from 198 databases.

== Standards ==
In addition to its library services, the organization is also involved in standard activities in areas related to bibliographical and search and retrieve standards. Areas of work include, National Diet Library Dublin Core Metadata Description (DC-NDL), and National Diet Library Linked Open Data (NDL LOD).

== See also ==
- Authority control
- List of academic databases and search engines

== Sources ==
- This article is based on information obtained from the National Diet Library website. The section on the formation of the NDL under the U.S. Occupation forces relies heavily on Leslie Pincus, "Revolution in the Archives of Memory: The Founding of the National Diet Library in Occupied Japan" in Francis X. Blouin and William G. Rosenberg, eds., Archives, Documentation, and Institutions of Social Memory: Essays from the Sawyer Seminar (Ann Arbor: University of Michigan Press, 2006).
- Kim, Chin (1969). "A New National Library: The National Diet Library of Japan". The Journal of Library History. University of Texas Press. 4 (3): 225–238.
