= Iha Fuyū =

Okinawan historian and linguist

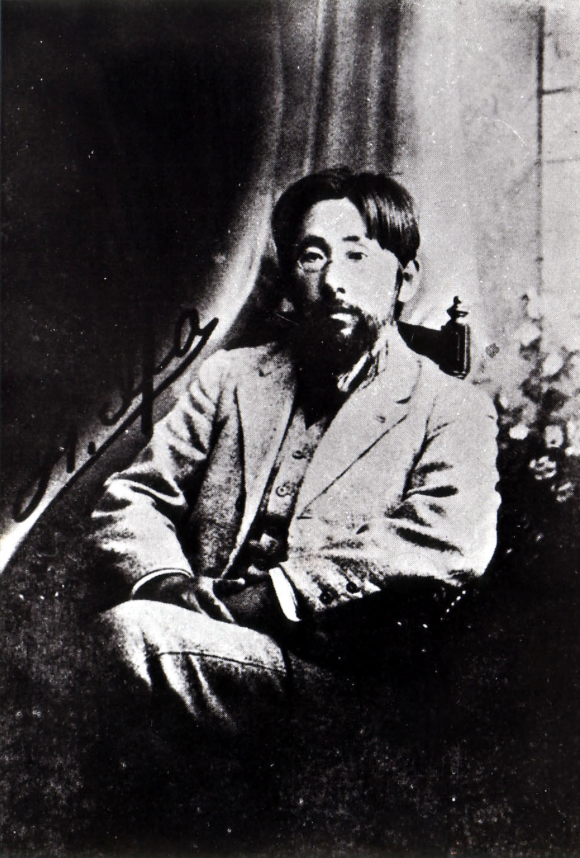
- Iha Fuyū
- Born: March 15, 1876; Naha, Ryukyu Kingdom
- Died: August 13, 1947 (aged 71); Tokyo, Japan
- Occupations: Scholar and writer (Okinawan culture and history)
- Writing career
- Genre: Academic nonfiction
- Notable works: Ko Ryūkyū (Ancient Ryukyu), Studies on Omoro Sōshi
- Literary movement: Okinawa has original culture but at the same time is under the influence of Japan

Iha Fuyū (伊波 普猷; March 15, 1876 – August 13, 1947) is considered the father of Okinawaology and was a Japanese scholar who studied various aspects of Japanese and Okinawan culture, customs, linguistics, and folklore. He signed his name as Ifa Fuyu in English, because of the Okinawan pronunciation. Iha studied linguistics at the University of Tokyo and was devoted to the study of Okinawan linguistics, folklore, and history. His most well-known work, Ko Ryūkyū (Ancient Ryūkyū), was published in 1911 and remains one of the best works on Okinawan studies. He devoted much time to uncovering the origins of the Okinawan people to establish their history. He had considerable influence not only on the study of Okinawan folklore but also on Japanese folklore.

== Life ==
Iha Fuyū (1876–1947) was born in Naha as the eldest son of a lower-class pechin. He entered Okinawa Middle School (now Shuri High School) in 1891. Four years later in 1895, he was dismissed due to leading strikes calling for the principal to resign after he dropped English from the school's curriculum. The next year he entered Meijigikai Middle School in Tokyo, followed by the Third Higher School (now Kyoto University). In 1903, he entered the linguistics course at Tokyo University's Department of Literature. After graduating in 1906, he moved back to Okinawa and was appointed the director of Okinawa Prefectural Library in 1910. He went on to organize the study of Esperanto (1917) and gave lectures on the Bible at a church (1918). In 1921, he was formally appointed as the director of Okinawa Prefectural Library but resigned three years later and moved to Tokyo to further his studies. In 1935, he gave lectures on the Omoro sōshi at Kokugakuin University. Ten years later he became the first president of the Association of Okinawan People. Then, on August 13, 1947, Iha Fuyū died in Tokyo at the house of fellow Okinawan historian Higa Shuncho.

== Publications ==
- "Urasoe-kō" [On Urasoe]. Ryukyu Shinpo, 1905.
- "Okinawajin no saidai ketten" [The Okinawan People's Biggest Shortcoming]. Okinawa Shimbun, February 11, 1909.
- "Shinkaron yori mitaru Okinawa no haihanchiken" [The establishment of Okinawa Prefecture from the viewpoint of evolution]. Okinawa Shimbun, December 12, 1909.
- Ko Ryūkyū [Ancient Ryukyu]. Naha: Okinawa Koronsha, 1911. Subsequent editions published 1916, 1942, 1944, 2000. [Japanese language]
- Kōtei Omoro sōshi [Revised Omoro Sōshi]. Naha: Minamijima Danwakai, 1925. [Japanese language]
- Kokugo hogengaku: Ryūkyū no hōgen [National Language Dialectology: The Ryukyu Dialect]. Tokyo: Meiji Shoin, 1933. [Japanese language]
- Onarigami no shima [The Island of Onarigami]. Tokyo: Rakurō Shoin, 1938, 1942. [in Japanese]
- Ifa Fuyū senshū [Selected Works of Iha Fuyu, 2 vols.]. Naha: Okinawa Times, 1962. [Japanese language]
- Ifa Fuyū zenshū [The Collected Works of Iha Fuyu, 11 vols.]. Tokyo: Heibonsha, 1976, 1993. [Japanese language]

== Ko Ryūkyū ==
This volume is his most representative work and remains a classic introduction to Okinawaology. Over the years, Iha made many revisions to the manuscript so interested readers should seek out the latest edition.

=== Linguistic study ===
Studying various words of Ryukyu and Japan used in days gone by, he came to the conclusion that Okinawa and Japan share the same mother tongue. The studied words include akaru, akezu, akatonki, amori, etsuri, fuguri (scrotum), fuku, hae (glory), hau, hiji, hiraku, hoso (umbricus), kanashi, iga, ikasarete, ikibui, ikutokoro, ime, iriki, kabuchi, kotoi, kuwanari, magu, majimono, mamaki, maru, minjai, mitsumi, monowata, mumuji, naegu, nai (earthquake), nasu, nuuji, sakuri, sayumi, shichiyadan, shishi, taani, tane (penis), tsukakamachi, tsukura, tubi, ugonaari, uwanari, wa, watamashi, yagusami, yokoshi, yomu, and yuimaharu.

=== The recent trend of the History of the Ryukyus ===
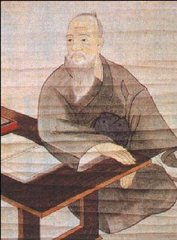
Sai On (Gushi-chan Bunjaku)

Three representative statesmen were described. They were given posthumous court ranks at the enthronement of Emperor Taishō, and Iha gave a lecture about them at the Okinawa Normal School. They were Sai On, Haneji Choshu (Shō Shōken, 向象賢) and Giwan Chōho. They managed to govern Ryukyu between Satsuma and China. Iha regarded them as the most important figures in Ryukyuan history.

Sai On's advice to the King: Negotiations with China are not difficult. If difficulties will arise, Kume people can manage to handle them. But Japan is not so. On one day, with only a piece of paper, a King may lose his position and it is definitely from Japan.

Okinawa's stand: to Okinawa, who will rule in China does not matter. Okinawa is not allowed to stick to justice. Okinawan people endure everything in order to live, or eat. An Okinawan saying says that who will let us eat, whoever it is, is our master. This is the fate of Okinawan people until the day of the placement of Okinawa Prefecture. To Japan, namely to the Shimazu clan, it did not know how to treat Okinawa soon after the establishment of Okinawa Prefecture.

=== Seven kinds of Omoro Sōshi ===
Omoro Sōshi is a collection of songs, 1553 poems and 1267 poems (when the same songs are excluded) in 22 volumes, starting in the middle of the thirteenth century and ending in the middle of the seventeenth century. It may be called the Man'yōshū of Okinawa. Omoro is the abbreviation of Omori uta, or songs sung in the sacred places of Ryukyu. The themes of the Omoro include the origin of Ryukyu, kings, heroes, voyages, poets, sceneries, heaven and stars, and very rarely romance. Omoro are the primary source for studying the Ryukyuan languages and ideologies.

=== The problem of students studying in China (Kansho) ===
China allowed Ryukyuan princes and others to study in China; at first, Ryukyuan students did not get good achievements. The great king Shō Shin started to allow the people of the town of Kume, who had come from China only 128 years before, to study in China. They spoke Chinese of course, and got high achievements. Four students from Kume who studied in Nanjing came back seven years later. Four others on the next turn, came back seven years later. The people of Kume eventually came to believe that students only came from Kume. Toward the end of the 18th century, the Ryukyuan government, based in Shuri, realized that education and politics went hand in hand and thought students should be also from Shuri. The people of Kume resisted with strikes. This is called the Kansho Problem or Soudou.

=== The P sound in Okinawan dialects ===
The changes of the sound of P → F → H in Ryukyuan dialects suggest the changes from P through F to H in the languages of historical Japan proper. Take care that this is in Ko Ryukyu.

On the sound of P in Ryukyuan dialect
Item	Shuri	Kunigami	Yaeyama	Miyakojima	Amami Oshima
Leaf	fa	pa	pa	pa	ha
Tomb	faka/haka	paka	paka	paka	haka
Flower	hana	pana	pana	pana	hana
Fire	fi	pi	pi	(umatsu)	(umatsu)
Sun	tiida	pi	pi	pi	hi, hyuru
Sail, Canvas	fu	pu	pu	pu	fu

In Late Middle Japanese it is written that although Proto-Japanese had a *[p], by Old Japanese it had already become [ɸ] and subsequently [h] during Early Modern Japanese where it remains today.

=== Other works ===
The weakest point of Okinawan People, The establishment of Okinawa Prefecture from the viewpoint of evolution, Did Heike people really come to Sakishima? Important place Urasoe, What does Shimajiri mean in many islands of Okinawa? A mysterious man Amawari, Documents of Wakou in Okinawa, A lovely Yaeyama girl, Nakasone Toyomiya in Miyako, Grand kumi stages of old Ryukyu, Poems of Southern Islands, The Bible translated into the Ryukyu language by Bernard Jean Bettelheim, On Konkō-kenshū (Old Ryukyu language dictionary), Akainko, the first Okinawan music musician. Mythologies in Okinawa.

== Okinawaology ==
Okinawaology is not an independent field of science, but a general term of various aspects of Okinawa studies. Okinawaology originated from Iha's Ko Ryūkyū (Ancient Ryukyu).

=== In General ===
Since the Ryukyu Kingdom was annexed by Imperial Japan, the Okinawan people were forcefully assimilated into mainland Japanese culture. With this as the background, Iha studied the culture of both mainland Japan and Okinawa, especially the languages and history of Okinawa. He proposed that the Okinawan and Japanese people shared a common ancestry. His studies started from the Omoro Sōshi, and covered the study of history, linguistics, anthropology, archaeology, study of religions, mythology, the study of civilization, ethnology and literature. Using the Okinawan language, he tried to raise the pride of Okinawans in their land. His proposals have been established as the basis of Okinawaology. Those who study Okinawaology are not restricted to scholars. Okinawaology covers many other branches, such as politics, economics, laws, and natural circumstances.

== Tomb ==
His tomb is located in Urasoe Park, near the Urasoe Castle Ruins and is engraved with the following epitaph.

No man knows Okinawa more deeply than Iha,

No man loves Okinawa more deeply than Iha,
No man worries about Okinawa more deeply than Iha,
He loves Okinawa because he knows Okinawa,
He worries about Okinawa because he loves Okinawa,
He was a scholar, an Okinawa-lover and at the same time, a prophet.
By Higashionna Kanjun

== Related persons ==
- Hashimoto Shin'kichi (1882–1945): Japanese language scholar.
- Hattori Shirō (1908–1995)
- Higa Shunchō (1883–1977): Okinawa historian. Esperantist.
- Higashionna Kanjun (1882–1963): Historian on Okinawa and professor at Takushoku University.
- Hokama Shuzen (b. 1924): Okinawan culture scholar.
- Iha Getsujō (1880–1945): Iha Fuyu's younger brother. Journalist at the Okinawa Mainichi newspaper.
- Kanagusuku Kiko (1875–1967): One of the co-leaders of the strike. Became the first physician in Okinawa and the director of Okinawa Prefectural Hospital.
- Kanna Kenwa (1877–1950): The main leader of the strike. Governor of Okinawa Narahara Shigeru helped him graduate the school. He joined the Russo-Japanese War and became a rear admiral of the Imperial Japanese Navy and a representative of the lower house.
- Kawakami Hajime (1879–1946)
- Kindaichi Kyōsuke (1882–1971)
- Kinjō Chōei (1902–1955): Okinawan language scholar.
- Kishaba Eijun (1885–1972): After meeting Iha, he studied the local aspects of Yaeyama.
- Kodama Kihachi (1856–1912): The vice principal (November 1889–September 1891) and principal (September 1891–April 1896) of Okinawa Normal School. In 1894, he wanted to discontinue English and a student strike began.
- Majikina Ankō (1875–1933): One of the co-leaders of the strike. Historian. In 1925, he became the director of Okinawa Prefectural Library. His One Thousand-Year History of Okinawa was said to be an encyclopedia of Okinawa.
- Minakata Kumagusu (1867–1941)
- Nakahara Zenchū (1890–1964): Okinawan culture scholar. Author of Omoro Sōshi Encyclopedia (1978) and History of Ryukyu (1978).
- Nakasone Seizen (1907–1995): After meeting Iha at Tokyo University, he studied the dialect of Okinawa. He led nursing students at the end of the war and spoke for peace.
- Nishime Goro or Tokuda Goro (1873–1938)
- Ogura Shinpei (1882–1944): Japanese language scholar.
- Orikuchi Shinobu (1887–1953)
- Sasaki Nobutsuna (1872–1963): Tanka poet, Japanese language scholar.
- Shibuzawa Keizō (1896–1963): Minister of Finance, Folklore scholar.
- Shimbukuro Gen'ichirō (1885–1942): Okinawa culture scholar.
- Shinmura Izuru (1876–1967)
- Tajima Risaburō (1869–1929): Iha Fuyu's teacher. He studied the Omoro Sōshi and gave Iha documents on it.
- Teruya Hiroshi (1875–1939): One of the co-leaders of the strike. After studying engineering at Kyoto University, he went to Taiwan, and later became mayor of Naha. He contributed to the clarification of the victims of the Mudan Incident of 1871.
- Torii Ryūzō (1870–1953)
- Yanagi Sōetsu (1889–1961)
- Yanagita Kunio (1875–1962)

== Notes ==
- Wonder - Okinawa on Iha Fuyu
- IHA Fuyu - Portraits of Modern Japanese Historical Figures
- Iha Fuyu Library Catalogue, in Japanese
- Institute for Okinawan studies, in Japanese
- Iha Fuyu, edit. Hokama Shuzen 2000 Ko Ryukyu, Iwanami Bunko, ISBN 4-00-381021-X. In Japanese
- Gregory Smits (1999). Visions of Ryukyu: Identity and Ideology in Early-Modern Thought and Politics. University of Hawai'i Press. ISBN 0-8248-2037-1.
- George Kerr, Mitsugu Sakihara (2000). Okinawa: The History of an Island People. Tuttle Publishing. ISBN 0-8048-2087-2.
