= Hodogaya Station =

Railway station in Yokohama, Japan

JO12 JS12 Hodogaya Station 保土ケ谷駅
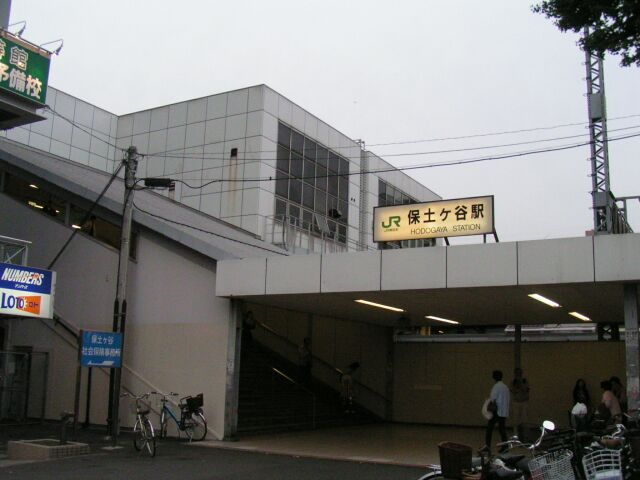
- West entrance

General information
- Location: Iwai-chō, Hodogaya-ku, Yokohama-shi, Kanagawa-ken 240-0023; Japan
- Coordinates: 35°26′48.26″N 139°35′59.3″E
- Operator: JR East
- Lines: Yokosuka Line; Shōnan-Shinjuku Line
- Distance: 31.8 km from Tokyo
- Platforms: 1 island platform
- Connections: Bus terminal

Other information
- Status: Staffed (Midori no Madoguchi )
- Station code: J012, JS12
- Website: Official website

History
- Opened: July 11, 1887

Passengers
- FY2019: 34,029 daily

Services
Preceding station	JR East	Following station
Higashi-Totsuka JO11 towards Kurihama	Yokosuka Line	Yokohama towards Tokyo
Higashi-Totsuka JS11 towards Zushi	Shōnan–Shinjuku Line Rapid Local	Yokohama towards Utsunomiya
Location
- Location within Kanagawa Prefecture Location within Japan

Hodogaya Station (保土ケ谷駅, Hodogaya-eki) is a passenger railway station located in Hodogaya-ku, Yokohama, Kanagawa Prefecture, Japan, operated by the East Japan Railway Company (JR East).

== Lines ==
Hodogaya Station is served by the Yokosuka Line and Shōnan-Shinjuku Line and is 31.8 kilometers from the terminus of the Yokosuka Line at Tokyo Station.

== Station layout ==
The station consists of a single island platform serving two tracks which are jointly used by trains of both the Yokosuka Line and the Shōnan-Shinjuku Line. Trains of the Tōkaidō Main Line pass through Hodogaya Station, but do not stop.

The station is above ground, with an above-track station building. To the east side of the platform runs the Tōkaidō Main Line, which does not have a platform. On the north side there is a section of track for trains to go out of service on, as well as a place where trains from Yokohama can change directions and turn back. On the Yokohama side there is also a lineman's operating base. Because there was once a freight platform, there are two signals on the north side. When these signals are red, passenger trains must wait to depart. The station has a Midori no Madoguchi staffed ticket office.

=== Platforms ===
1	Yokosuka Line	for Yokohama, Musashi-Kosugi, Shinagawa and Tokyo; Sōbu Line (Rapid) for Chiba, Narita Line for Narita Airport, Uchibō Line for Kimitsu, Sotobō Line for Kazusa-Ichinomiya
1	Shōnan-Shinjuku Line	for Yokohama, Musashi-Kosugi, Shinjuku, Ōmiya, Oyama and Utsunomiya (via Utsunomiya Line)
2	Yokosuka Line	for Ōfuna, Zushi, Kamakura, Yokosuka, and Kurihama
2	Shōnan-Shinjuku Line	for Ōfuna and Zushi (via Yokosuka Line)

== History ==
Hodogaya Station was opened on July 11, 1887 as a station on the Japanese Government Railways (JGR), the predecessor to the post-war Japanese National Railways (JNR). Initially for passenger operations only, freight operations began the following year. In 1930 when Yokosuka Line trains were replaced by electric multiple units, all Tōkaidō Line trains ceased to stop at the station.

Although the station was located in the town named 保土ヶ谷 (Hodogaya), originally the station was named 程ヶ谷 (Hodogaya). The station was renamed to its present name 保土ヶ谷, with no change in pronunciation, on October 1, 1931 following the petition for the renaming by the mayor of Yokohama on July 8, 1927.

All freight operations were discontinued from October 1, 1979 when the new freight line that bypassed the station opened. Operation of Yokosuka Line trains was transferred from the tracks shared by the Tōkaidō Line trains to the former freight tracks in 1980. With the privatization of JNR on April 1, 1987, the station came under the operational control of JR East.

== Passenger statistics ==
In fiscal 2019, the station was used by an average of 34,029 passengers daily (boarding passengers only).

The passenger figures (boarding passengers only) for previous years are as shown below.

Fiscal year	daily average
2005	30,810
2010	31,855
2015	33,001

== Surrounding area ==
- Japan National Route 1
- Seirei Yokohama Hospital

== See also ==
- List of railway stations in Japan
