= Higashi-Totsuka Station =

Railway station in Yokohama, Japan

JO11 JS11 Higashi-Totsuka Station 東戸塚駅
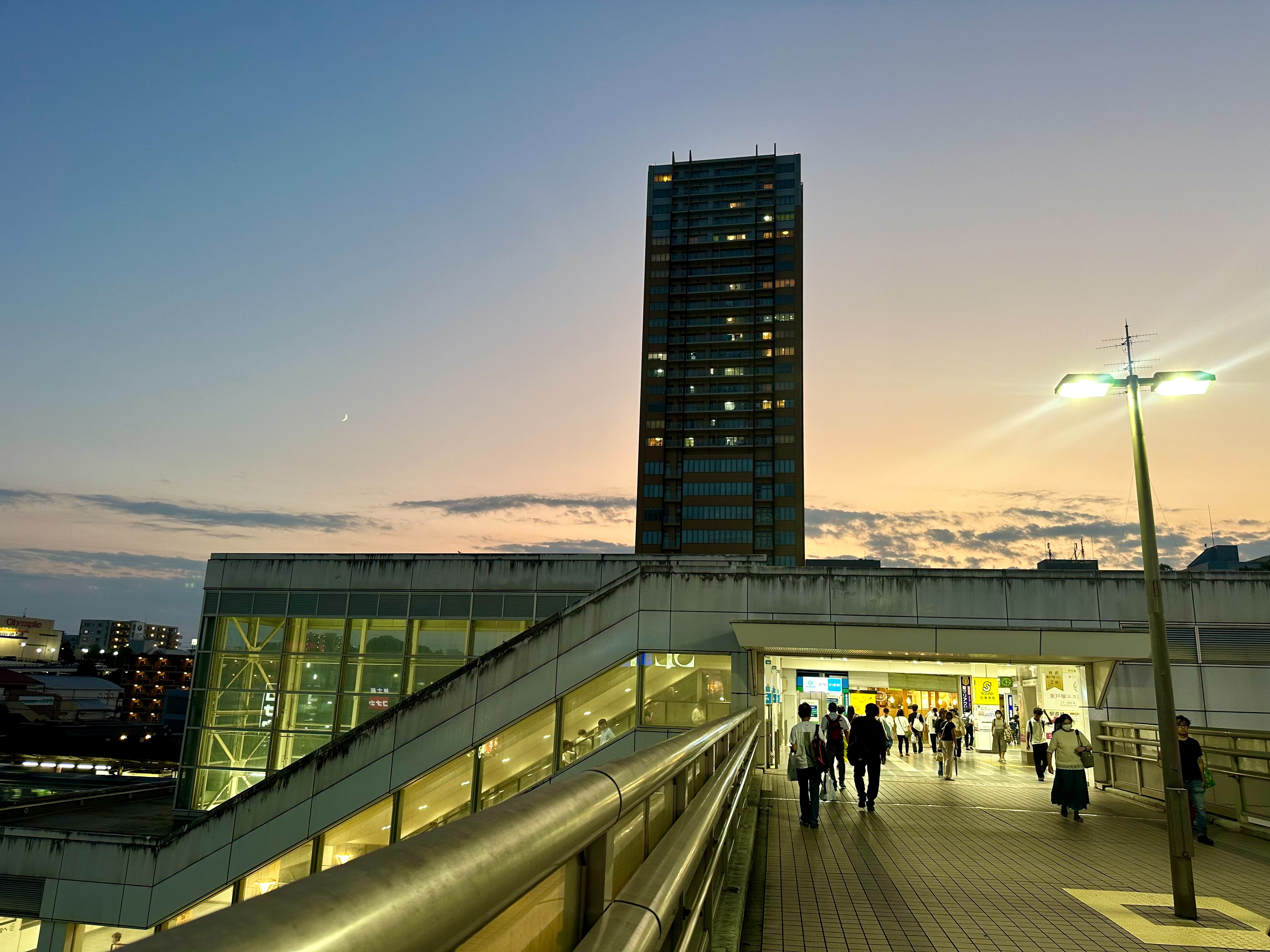
- East Exit of Higashi-Totsuka Station, September 2024

General information
- Location: 692 Shinano-chō, Totsuka-ku, Yokohama-shi, Kanagawa-ken 244-0801; Japan
- Coordinates: 35°25′48″N 139°33′24″E
- Operator: JR East
- Lines: Yokosuka Line; Shōnan-Shinjuku Line
- Distance: 36.7 km from Tokyo
- Platforms: 1 island platform

Other information
- Status: Staffed (Midori no Madoguchi )
- Station code: JO11, JS11
- Website: Official website

History
- Opened: October 1, 1980

Passengers
- FY2019: 44,389 daily

Services
Preceding station	JR East	Following station
Totsuka towards Kurihama	Yokosuka Line	Hodogaya JO12 towards Tokyo
Totsuka towards Zushi	Shōnan–Shinjuku Line Rapid Local	Hodogaya JS12 towards Utsunomiya
Location
- Location within Kanagawa Prefecture Location within Japan

Higashi-Totsuka Station (東戸塚駅, Higashi-Totsuka-eki) is a passenger railway station located in Totsuka-ku, Yokohama, Kanagawa Prefecture, Japan, operated by the East Japan Railway Company (JR East). The station was formerly operated by the Japanese National Railways (JNR).

Since this station was built a long time ago, it has been under repair.

== Lines ==
Higashi-Totsuka Station is served by the Shōnan-Shinjuku Line and the Yokosuka Line. It is located 36.7 km from the terminus of the Yokosuka Line at Tokyo Station. The station is located on the Tōkaidō Main Line, but trains operating on the Tōkaidō Main Line do not stop at Higashi-Totsuka. Instead, there are a set of tracks on the left of Higashi Totsuka station where the trains on the Tokaido line pass (not to be confused with the tracks on the right, witch is operated by JR freight).

== Station layout ==
The station consists of a single island platform with two tracks. The station buildings are built above the platforms. The station had a Midori no Madoguchi staffed ticket office, but it has been closed since August 2024.

The Yokosuka line and the Shōnan-Shinjuku through services share the exact same platforms.

=== Platforms ===
1	Yokosuka Line	for Yokohama, Musashi-Kosugi, Shinagawa and Tokyo; Sōbu Line (Rapid) for Chiba, Narita Line for Narita Airport, Uchibō Line for Kimitsu, Sotobō Line for Kazusa-Ichinomiya
1	Shōnan-Shinjuku Line	for Yokohama, Musashi-Kosugi, Shinjuku, Ōmiya, Oyama and Utsunomiya (via Utsunomiya Line)
2	Yokosuka Line	for Ōfuna, Zushi, Kamakura, Yokosuka, and Kurihama
2	Shōnan-Shinjuku Line	for Ōfuna and Zushi (via Yokosuka Line)

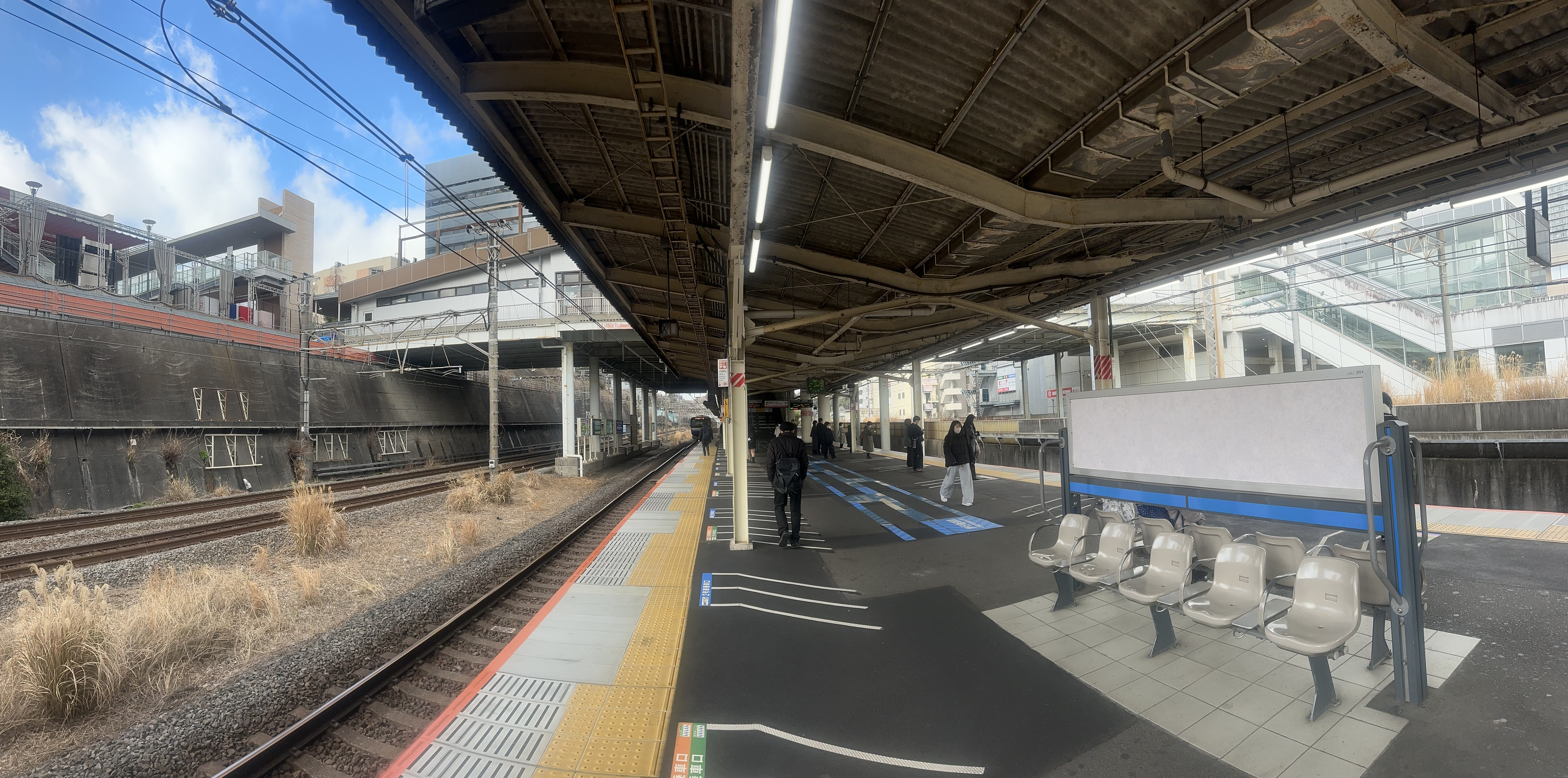
View of the station platforms

== History ==
Higashi-Totsuka Station opened as a station on the Japanese National Railways (JNR) on October 1, 1980, after local residents had petitioned the government for a railway station for over a half century. The opening coincided with the separation of the tracks for the Tōkaidō Main Line and Yokosuka Line into two separate sets of tracks from Yokohama through Ōfuna Station.

== Passenger statistics ==
In fiscal 2019, the station was used by an average of 44,389 passengers daily (boarding passengers only). Higashi totsuka station is very crowded in the morning and night rush hours. Whenever a train arrives at the station, there is a long line for the escalator going toward the station building, which is above the tracks. The escalator that goes down to the platforms of Higashi totsuka station changes to an escalator that goes up to the station building at 5:30 P.M JST.

The passenger figures (boarding passengers only) for previous years are as shown below.

Fiscal year	daily average
2005	58,172
2010	57,754
2015	58,172

== Surrounding area ==
- Aurora Mall, in front of the train station, houses Aeon and Seibu stores.
- Yokohama City Kawakami Kita Elementary School
- Yokohama City Kawakami Elementary School
- Yokohama City Shinano Elementary School

== See also ==
- List of railway stations in Japan
