= Kita-Kamakura Station =

Railway station in Kamakura, Kanagawa Prefecture, Japan

Coordinates: 35°20′17″N 139°32′40″E

JO08 JS08 Kita-Kamakura Station 北鎌倉駅
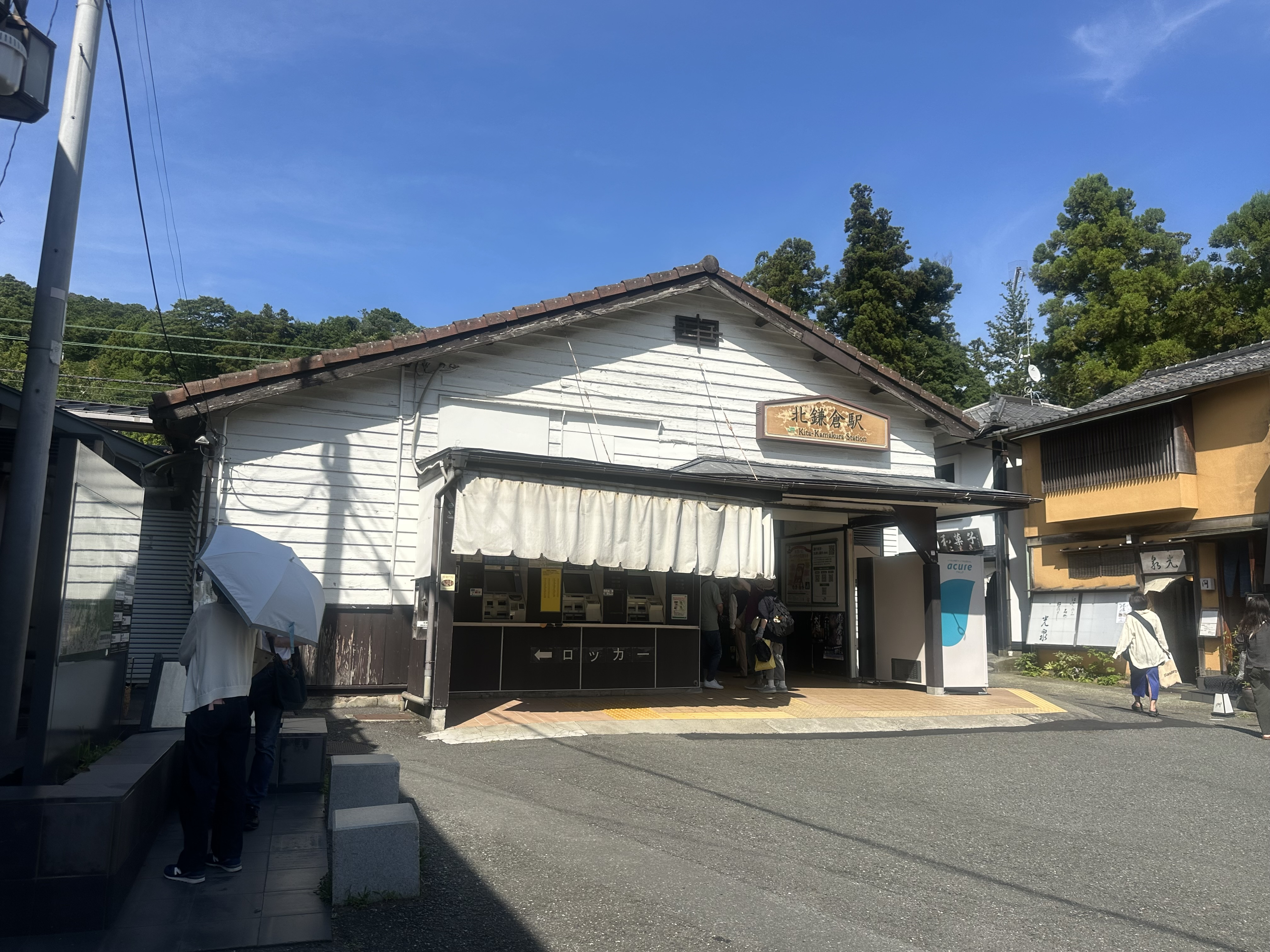
- Kita-Kamakura Station, June 2025

General information
- Location: Yamanouchi, Kamakura, Kanagawa （神奈川県鎌倉市山ノ内） Japan
- Operator: JR East
- Lines: Yokosuka Line; Shōnan-Shinjuku Line

History
- Opened: 1927

Passengers
- FY2008: 8,596 daily

Services
Preceding station	JR East	Following station
Kamakura JO07 towards Kurihama	Yokosuka Line	Ōfuna towards Tokyo
Kamakura JS07 towards Zushi	Shōnan–Shinjuku Line Rapid Local	Ōfuna towards Utsunomiya
Location

Kita-Kamakura Station (北鎌倉駅, Kitakamakura-eki) is a railway station on the Yokosuka Line in Kamakura, Kanagawa, Japan, operated by East Japan Railway Company (JR East).

== Lines ==
Kita-Kamakura Station is located on the Yokosuka Line and is also served by Shōnan-Shinjuku Line through services. It is located 2.3 km from the junction at Ōfuna Station, and 51.7 km from Tokyo Station.

== Station layout ==
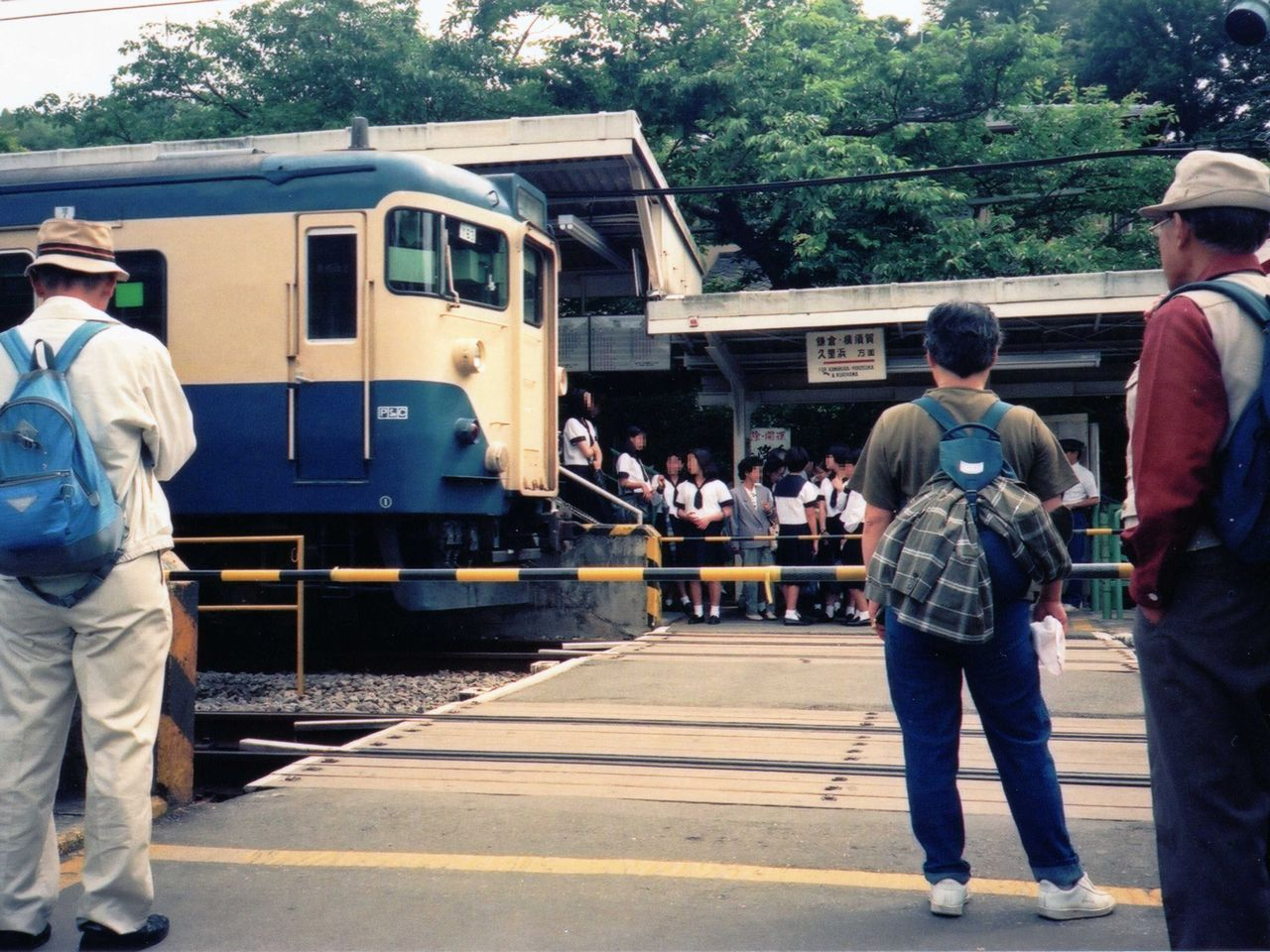
Level crossing providing access between platforms in 1994

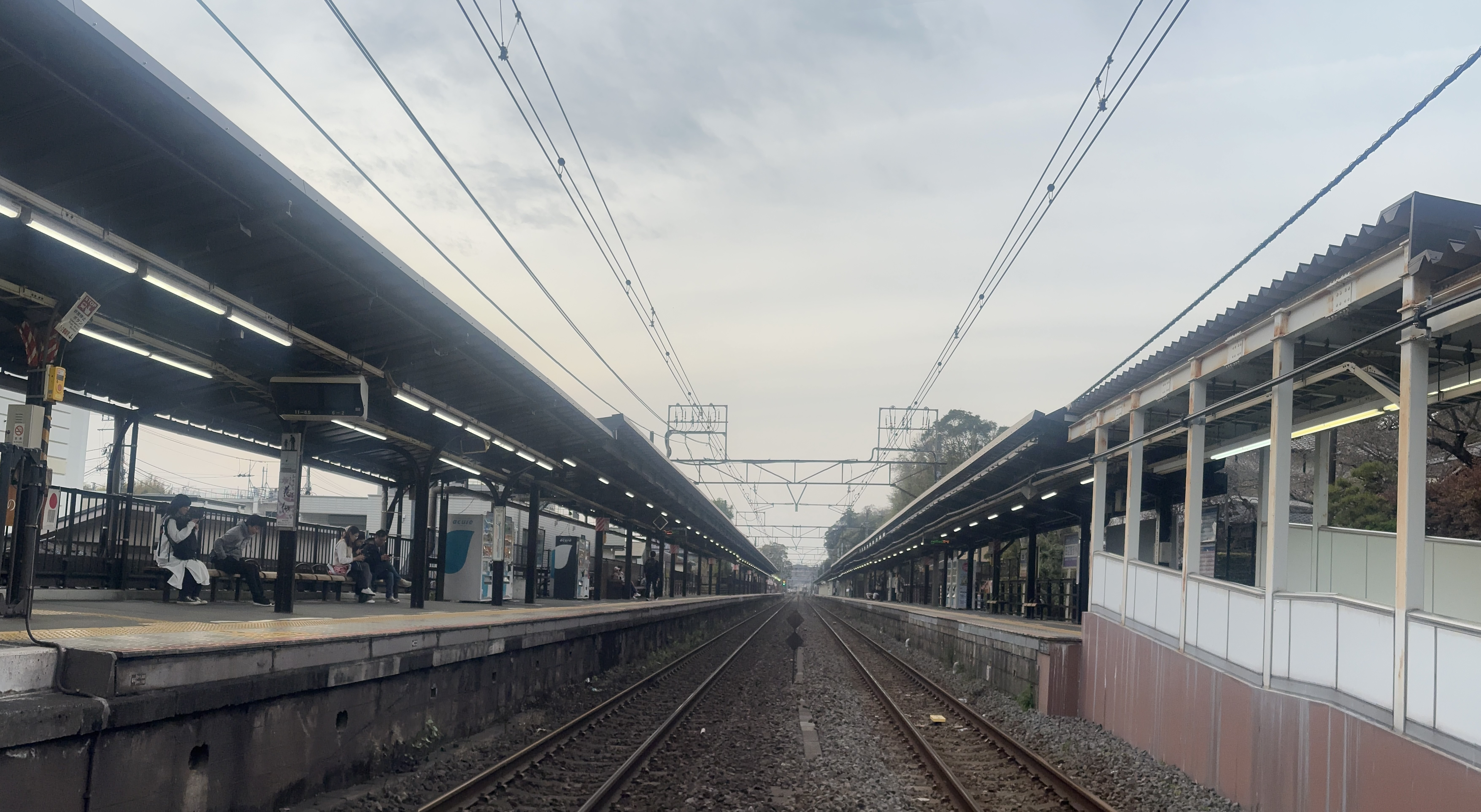
Both platforms as seen in 2024

Kita-Kamakura Station has two opposed side platforms serving two tracks, which are connected by a level crossing at the Kamakura end of the platforms. The station building is located on the side of the up (Tokyo-bound) track at the end of the platform nearest to Kamakura. To reach the down platform, passengers must cross the tracks via a level-crossing.

The station building has one normal exit, the front exit (表口, omote guchi), where there are three automatic ticket gates. However, during the morning school commute time only, students of the Kamakura Gakuen schools and Kita-Kamakura Joshi Gakuen schools can exit without passing through the ticket gates, via a temporary exit. This exit does not have a ticket gate.

On the side of the tracks leading away from Tokyo there is special exit which, like the Front Exit, is usable all day. It is mainly intended for disembarking, but passengers who already have a ticket from this station, or who are using a Suica or Suica-affiliated IC card can enter here. There is no automatic ticket gate, and only a very simple Suica touch point. There is one more special exit on the same side of the tracks, near the middle of the platform. It is only usable during the morning rush hour, Golden Week, and other times when the station is very crowded. During crowded weekend days and holidays there is a station attendant manning the ticket gate there, allowing payment in cash. A simple Suica touch point was installed in 2008.

The station was made barrier-free in 2014 with the installation of elevators and wheelchair ramps. As part of the construction, the platforms were also extended by seven meters and roofed over, and new accessible restrooms were installed.

=== Platforms ===
1	Yokosuka Line	for Ōfuna, Yokohama, Tokyo, Chiba; Sōbu Main Line for Narutō; Sotobō Line for Kazusa-Ichinomiya; Uchibō Line for Kimitsu; Narita Line for Narita Airport
1	Shōnan-Shinjuku Line	for Ōfuna, Yokohama, Shinjuku, Ōmiya, and Utsunomiya
2	Yokosuka Line	for Kamakura, Zushi, Yokosuka, and Kurihama
2	Shōnan-Shinjuku Line	for Kamakura and Zushi

== History ==
Kita-Kamakura Station opened 20 May 1927 as a station on the Japanese Government Railways (JGR), the pre-war predecessor to the Japanese National Railways (JNR) to serve the Yokosuka Naval Arsenal and related Imperial Japanese Navy facilities at Yokosuka. It was initially a temporary stop, in operation from the months of May through October, but was upgraded to a full station on 1 October 1930, at which time the present station building was completed. The station came under the management of JR East upon the privatization of the Japanese National Railways (JNR) on 1 April 1987.

== Surrounding area ==
Kita-Kamakura Station is close to three major Buddhist temples: Engaku-ji, Kenchō-ji, and Tōkei-ji.
