= Taura Station =

Railway station in Yokosuka, Kanagawa Prefecture, Japan

JO04 Taura Station 田浦駅
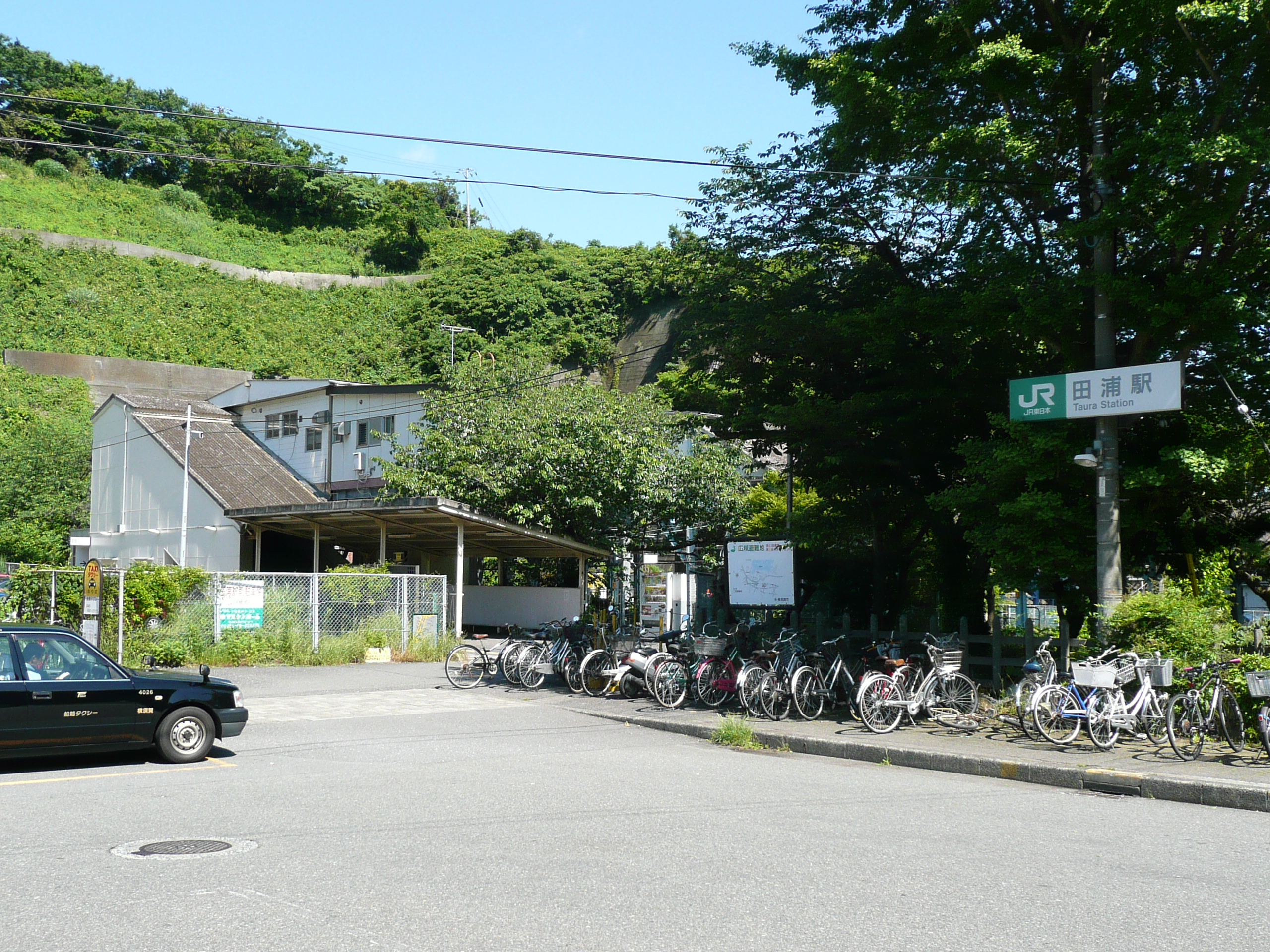
- The south entrance to Taura Station in May 2012

General information
- Location: 1-6 Taura-cho; Yokosuka, Kanagawa; Japan
- Coordinates: 35.2926°N 139.6369°E
- Operator: JR East
- Line: Yokosuka Line
- Distance: 63.2 km (39.3 mi) from Tokyo
- Platforms: 1 island platform
- Tracks: 2
- Connections: Bus stop

Construction
- Structure type: Below-grade
- Accessible: Yes

Other information
- Station code: JO04
- Website: Official website

History
- Opened: May 1, 1904

Passengers
- FY2019: 2,232 daily

Services
Preceding station	JR East	Following station
Yokosuka JO03 towards Kurihama	Yokosuka Line	Higashi-Zushi JO05 towards Tokyo
Location
- Location within Kanagawa Prefecture Location within Japan

Taura Station (Japanese: 田浦駅, Hepburn: Taura-eki) is a passenger railway station in located in the city of Yokosuka, Kanagawa, Japan, operated by East Japan Railway Company (JR East).

== Lines ==
Taura Station is served by the Yokosuka Line. It is located 13.8 kilometres (8.6 mi) from Ōfuna Station, and 63.2 kilometres (39.3 mi) from the start of the line at Tokyo Station.

== Station layout ==
The station has two tracks and a single island platform connected to a station building above the tracks by a footbridge. The station is located in a valley between two tunnels, limiting the usable length of the platform. As a result, 11-car trains use selective door operation at the station: the doors of the first car and the first door of the second car remain closed. The E217 series and E235 series trains used on the Yokosuka Line are equipped to keep those doors closed at the station and have warning stickers on the doors that do not open.

The station building has exits on either side of the overpass, with ticket gates in the center. Elevators were installed in March 2010 between the concourse inside the ticket gates and the platform, and between the station building outside the ticket gates and the exits. A multi-function toilet was also installed.

=== Platforms ===
1	Yokosuka Line	for Zushi, Ōfuna, Yokohama, Tokyo, Chiba, and Narita Airport
2	Yokosuka Line	for Yokosuka and Kurihama

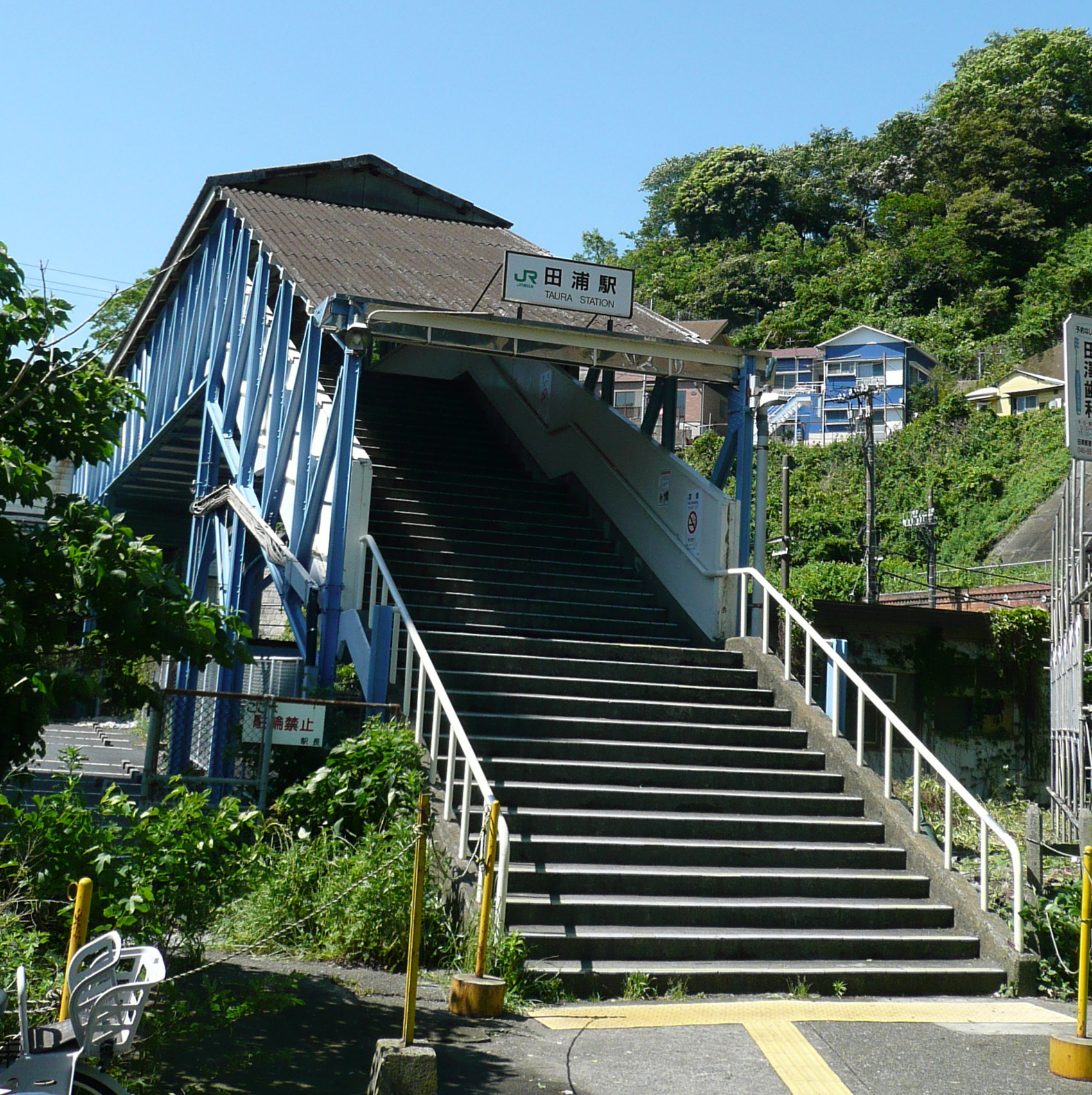
The north entrance in May 2012

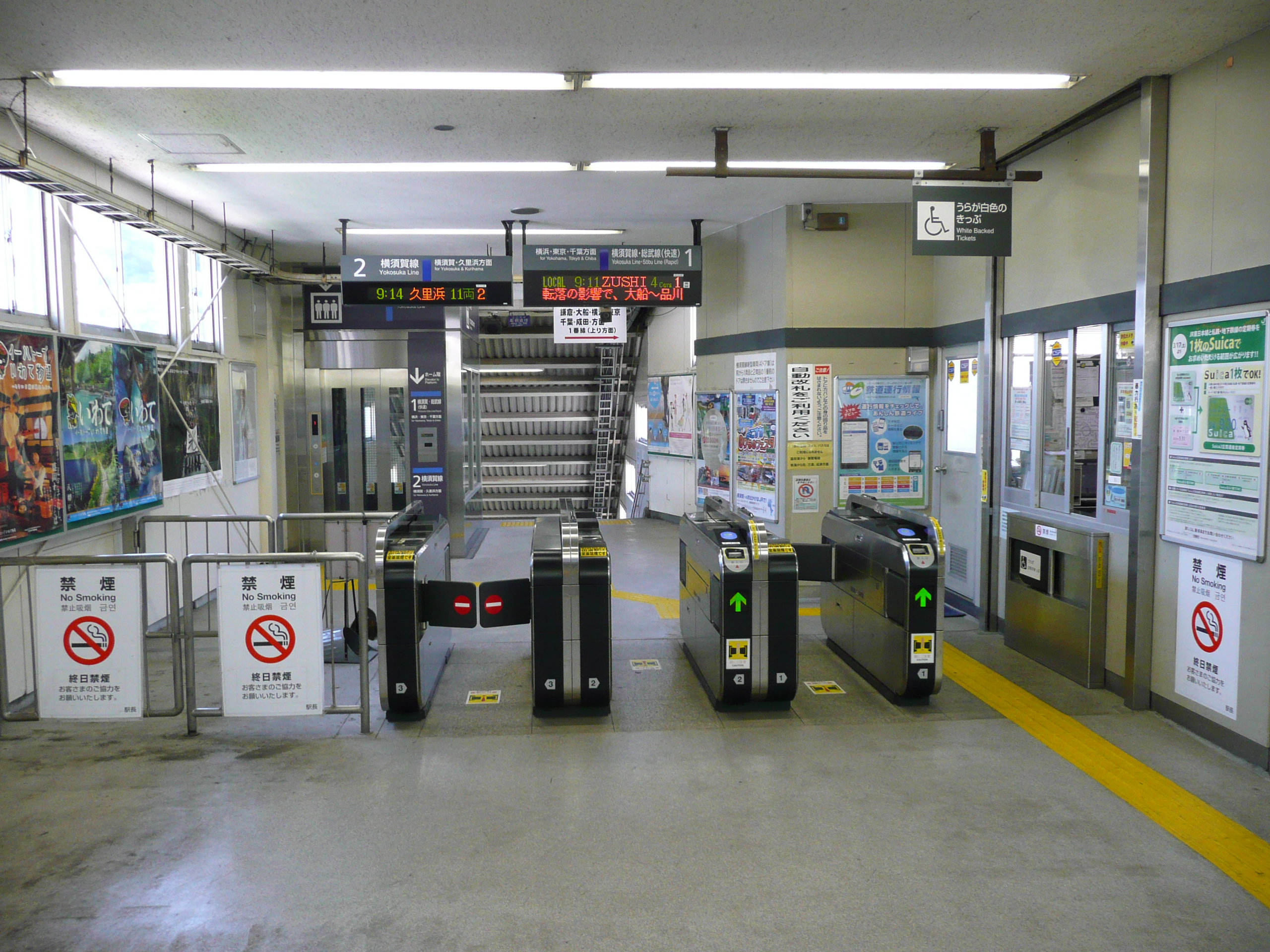
The ticket barriers in May 2012

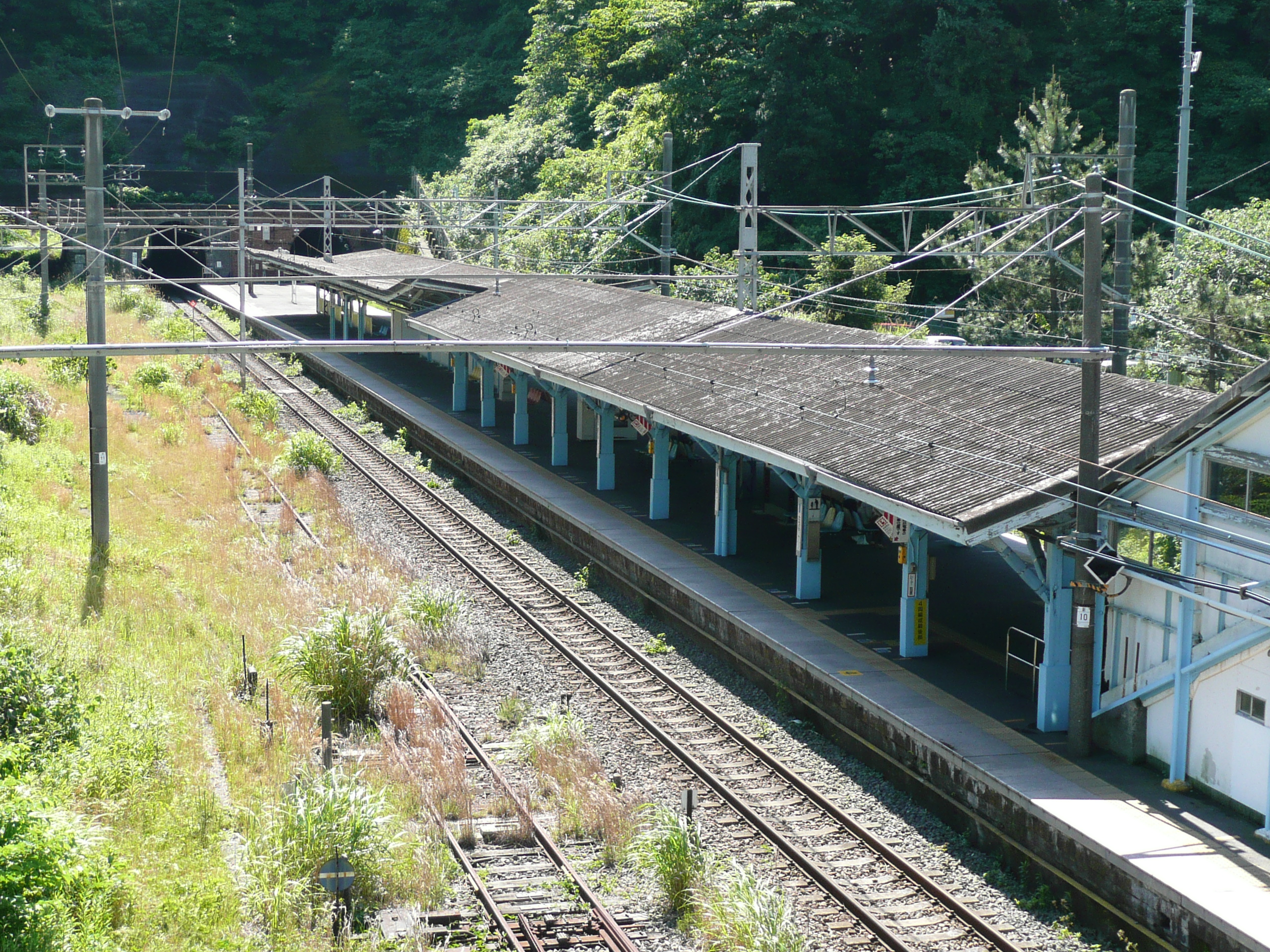
The platform viewed from above in May 2012

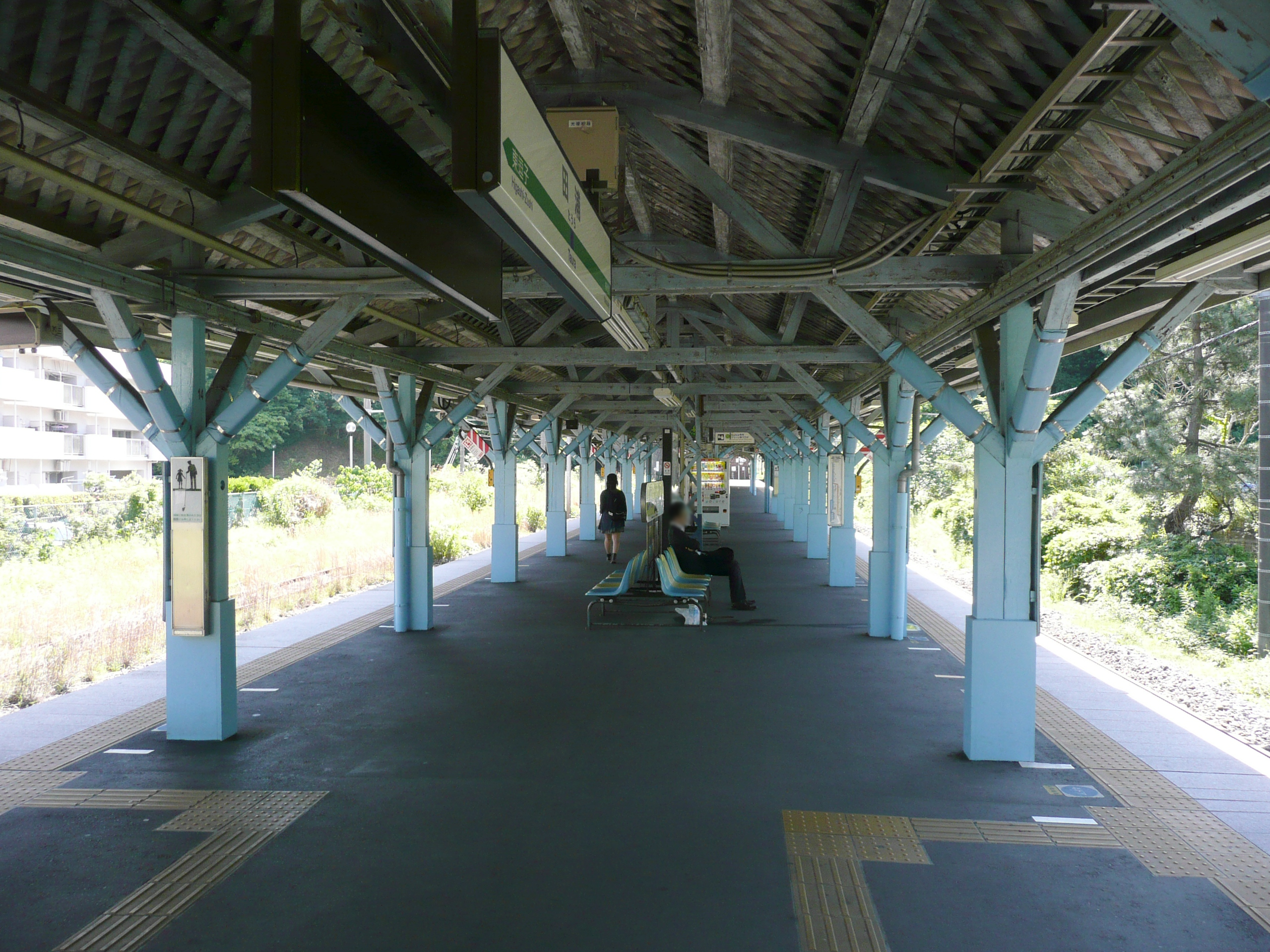
The platform in May 2012

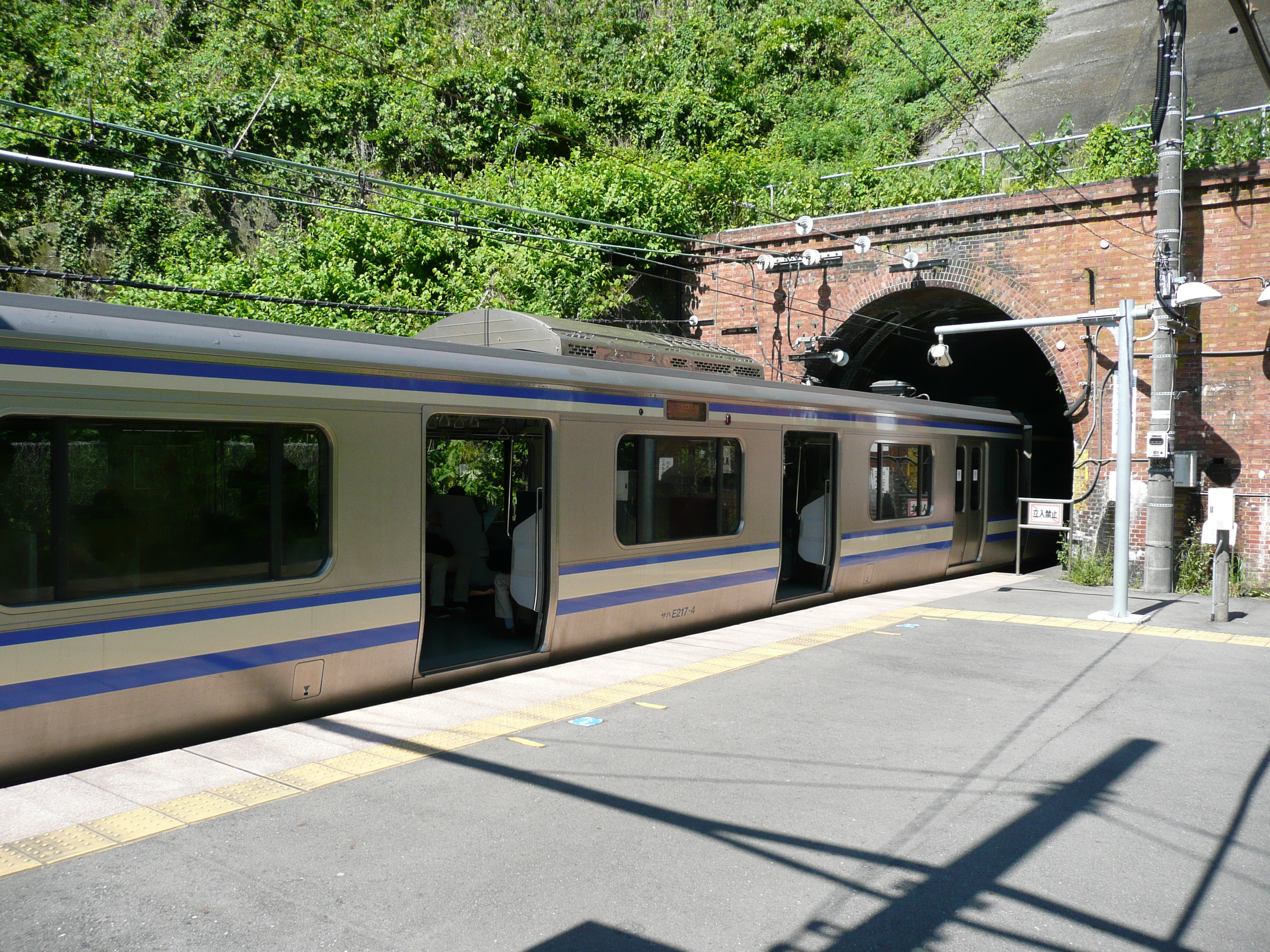
A train at the station in May 2012 with one coach inside the tunnel

== History ==
Taura Station opened on May 1, 1904 as a station on the Japanese Government Railways (JGR), the pre-war predecessor to the Japanese National Railways (JNR). The spur line from Ōfuna to serve the Yokosuka Naval Arsenal and related Imperial Japanese Navy facilities at Yokosuka was renamed the Yokosuka Line in October 1909. The station came under the management of JR East upon the privatization of JNR on April 1, 1987.

== Passenger statistics ==
In fiscal 2019, the station was used by an average of 2,232 passengers daily (boarding passengers only).

The passenger figures (boarding passengers only) for previous years are as shown below.

Fiscal year	daily average
2005	2,915
2010	2,561
2015	2,353

== Surrounding area ==
- Nagaura Port
- JMSDF Yokosuka Hospital

== See also ==
- List of railway stations in Japan
