= Nagae-Sakurayama Kofun Cluster =

Pair of Kofun period burial mounds in Japan

Nagae-Sakurayama Kofun cluster
- 長柄桜山古墳群 (Japanese)
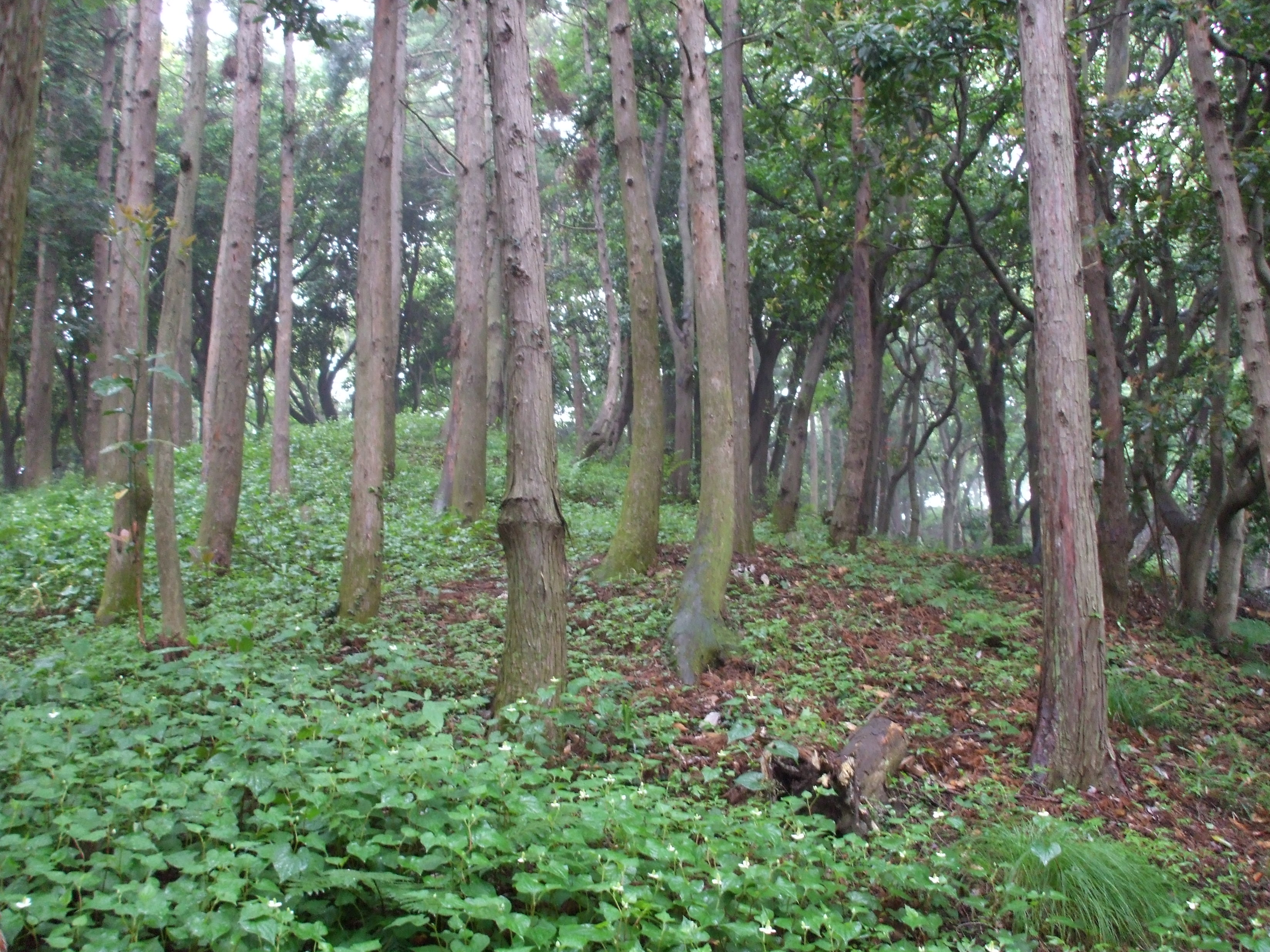
- Nagae-Sakurayama Kofun No.1

- Nagae-Sakurayama Kofun cluster Nagae-Sakurayama Kofun Cluster (Japan)
- 35°17′14″N 139°35′05″E
- Type: kofun
- Periods: Kofun period
- Location: Zushi-Hayama, Kanagawa, Japan
- Region: Kantō region

History
- Built: 4th century AD

Site notes
- Elevation: 10 m (33 ft)
- Excavation dates: 1999
- Public access: Yes (no facilities)

The Nagae-Sakurayama Kofun cluster (長柄桜山古墳群, Nagae-Sakurayama kofun-gun) is a pair of Kofun period burial mound located on the border of the city of Zushi and town of Hayama, Kanagawa Prefecture in the southern Kantō region of Japan. The pair were designated a National Historic Site in 2002. It is the only known keyhole-shaped tumuli in the Miura Peninsula, and the largest in Kanagawa Prefecture.

== Overview ==
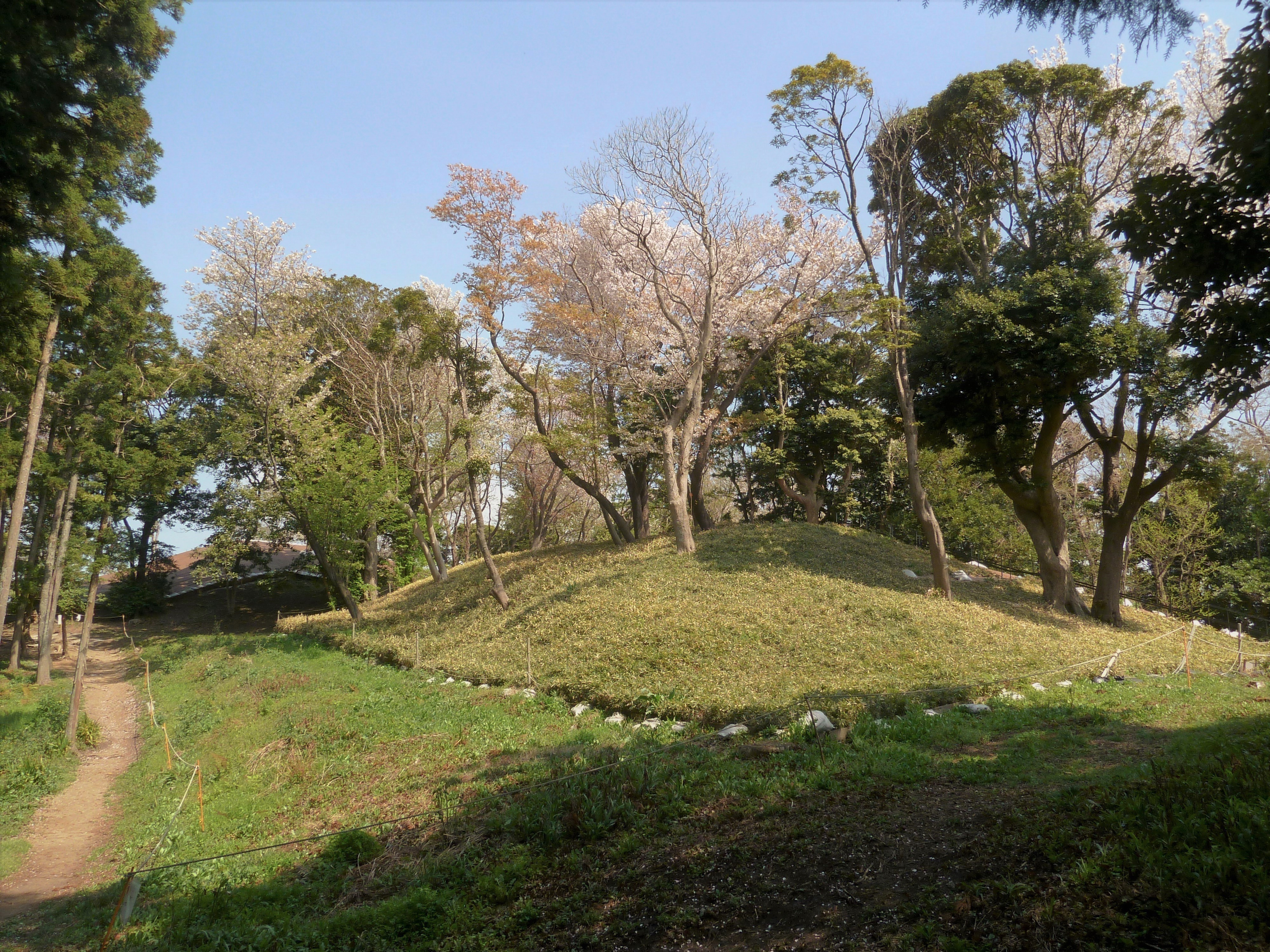
Nagae-Sakurayama Kofun Cluster (Kofun 1)

The Nagae-Sakurayama Kofun cluster is located on a hill facing Sagami Bay near the head of the Miura Peninsula, and consists of two zenpō-kōen-fun (前方後円墳), which is shaped like a keyhole, having one square end and one circular end, when viewed from above.

Around 1994, local archaeologists suspected the presence of a kofun in this location due to the shape shown on topographical maps, but it was not until trees and overgrowth were cleared in preparation for construction work on a cell phone transmission tower in March 1999, that fragments of haniwa were discovered, and the presence of a tumulus was confirmed. The site is located at an elevation of 127.3 meters and is located the inland side of a hill, approximately one kilometer from the coast. The total length of the tumulus was 90 meters and it was orientated northeast to southwest with the front portion to the southwest. The tumulus was made by carving out the bedrock and then constructing an embankment on the rear and front parts. It was built in three steps for the rear circle and two tiers in the front part. In the center of the rear circle, a seven meter-long depression was found. This was the burial chamber, in which a clay-covered wooden casket was placed. No grave goods have been recovered. Part of the north and east side of the mound have collapsed. Both pot-shaped haniwa and cylindrical haniwa, as well as Haji ware pottery shards were found. Further construction on the transmission tower was canceled and the tumulus was designated the Nagara Sakurayama No.1 burial mound.

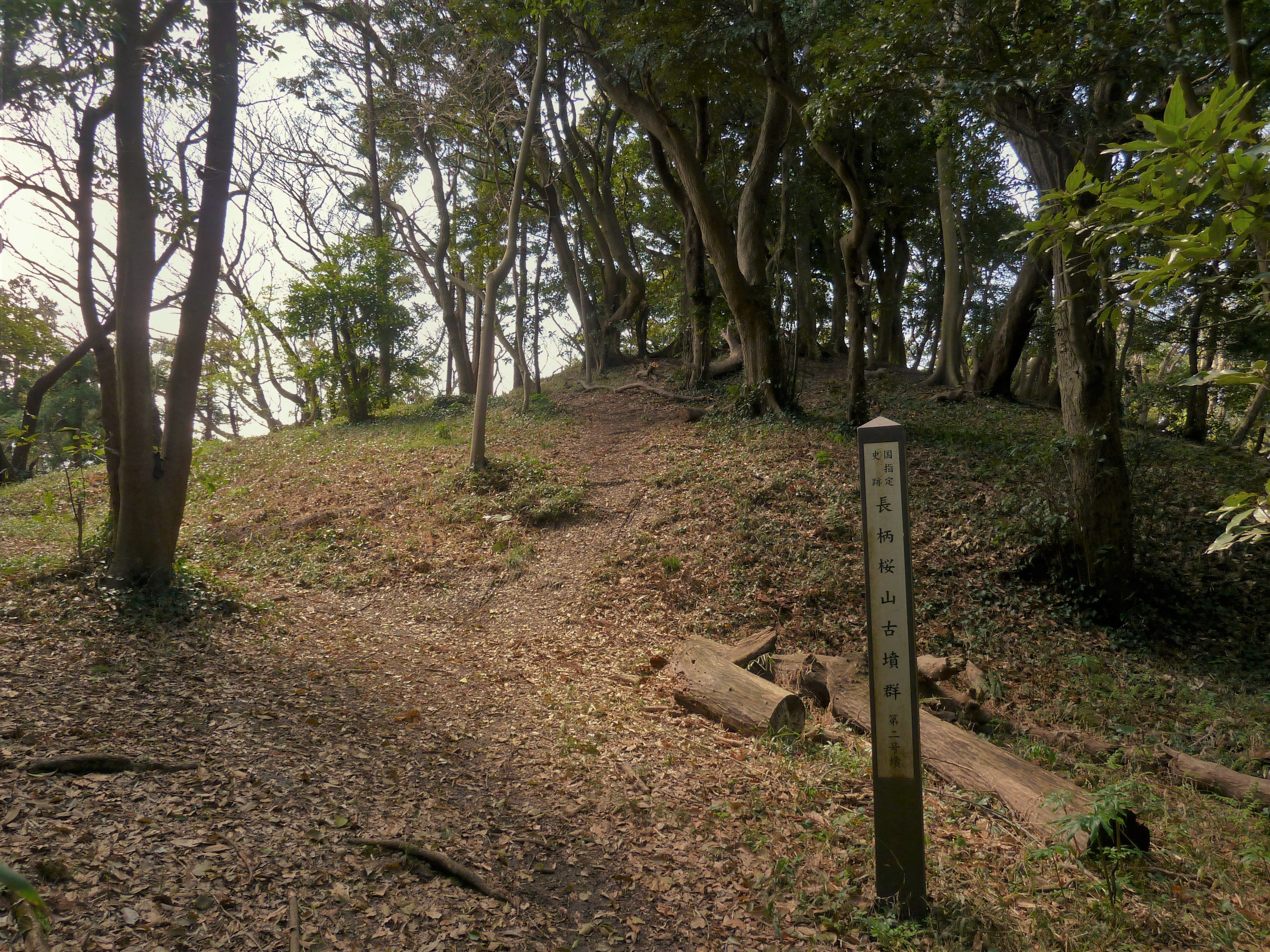
Nagae-Sakurayama Kofun Cluster (Kofun 2)

Shortly thereafter, archaeologists in Kanagawa Prefecture found a second keyhole-shaped kofun on the same hill about 500 meters to the west, at an elevation of 101.5 meters, facing the coast. The determination was initially made solely by the topography of the site as no haniwa fragments were initially found, but a preliminary excavation in June 1999 confirmed that it was indeed a kofun, with a total length of 88 meters. This kofun was orientated east to west, with the front part pacing west, and was designated the Nagara Sakurayama No.2 burial mound. Fukiishi, which were not present on the Nagara Sakurayama No.1 burial mound were discovered, and fragments of pot-shaped haniwa and cylindrical haniwa were also later discovered. The fukiishi on the lower part of the mound is mainly yellow mudstone, and the upper part is mainly white sandstone. The mudstone was carried from the coast because traces of organisms living on the coast can be seen, the sandstone came from the Sagami River or the Tama River.

Both are estimated to have been built around the 4th century in the early Kofun period. Although the Miura Peninsula appears to be a cul-de-sac, until the Nara period this area was on the route of the ancient Tōkaidō highway, and was on the route which the semi-legendary Yamato Takeru travelled to cross into the Bōsō Peninsula as described in the Kojiki. The presence of these keyhole-shaped kofun indicates the existence of a powerful clan in this area, with a strong connection to the Kinai area in this period of Japanese prehistory.

Nagara Sakurayama No.1

Overall length
91.3 meters
Posterior circular portion
52.1 meter diameter x 7 meter high
Anterior rectangular portion
31.5 meters wide x 4 meters high

Nagara Sakurayama No.2

Overall length
88 meters
Posterior circular portion
54 meter diameter x 7 meter high
Anterior rectangular portion
45 meters wide x 8.7 meters high

The site is a five-minute walk from the "Hasakura" bus stop on the Keikyū bus from Zushi Station on the JR East Yokosuka Line and is part of a local hiking course. Hayama Town and Zushi City are currently cooperating to preserve and maintain the tumuli.

== See also ==
- List of Historic Sites of Japan (Kanagawa)
