= Higashi-Zushi Station =

Railway station in Zushi, Kanagawa Prefecture, Japan

JO05 Higashi-Zushi Station 東逗子駅
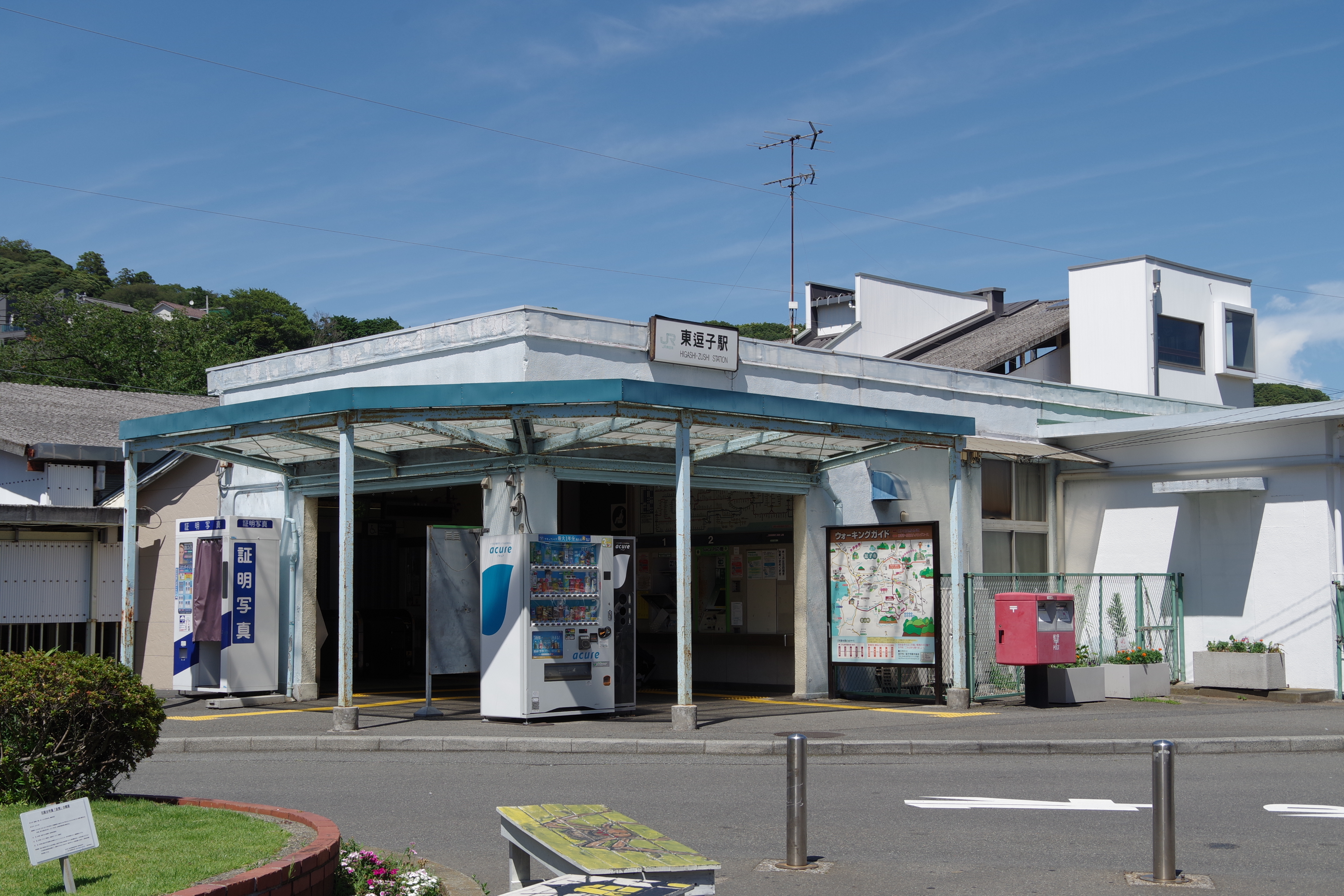
- Higahi-Zushi Station

General information
- Location: 2-28 Numama, Zushi-shi, Kanagawa-ken 249-0004; Japan
- Coordinates: 35.2984°N 139.6018°E
- Operator: JR East
- Line: Yokosuka Line
- Distance: 59.8 km from Tokyo
- Platforms: 1 island platform
- Connections: Bus terminal

Other information
- Status: Staffed
- Station code: JO05
- Website: Official website

History
- Opened: April 1, 1952

Passengers
- FY2019: 4,944 daily

Services
Preceding station	JR East	Following station
Taura JO04 towards Kurihama	Yokosuka Line	Zushi JO06 towards Tokyo
Location
- Location within Kanagawa Prefecture Location within Japan

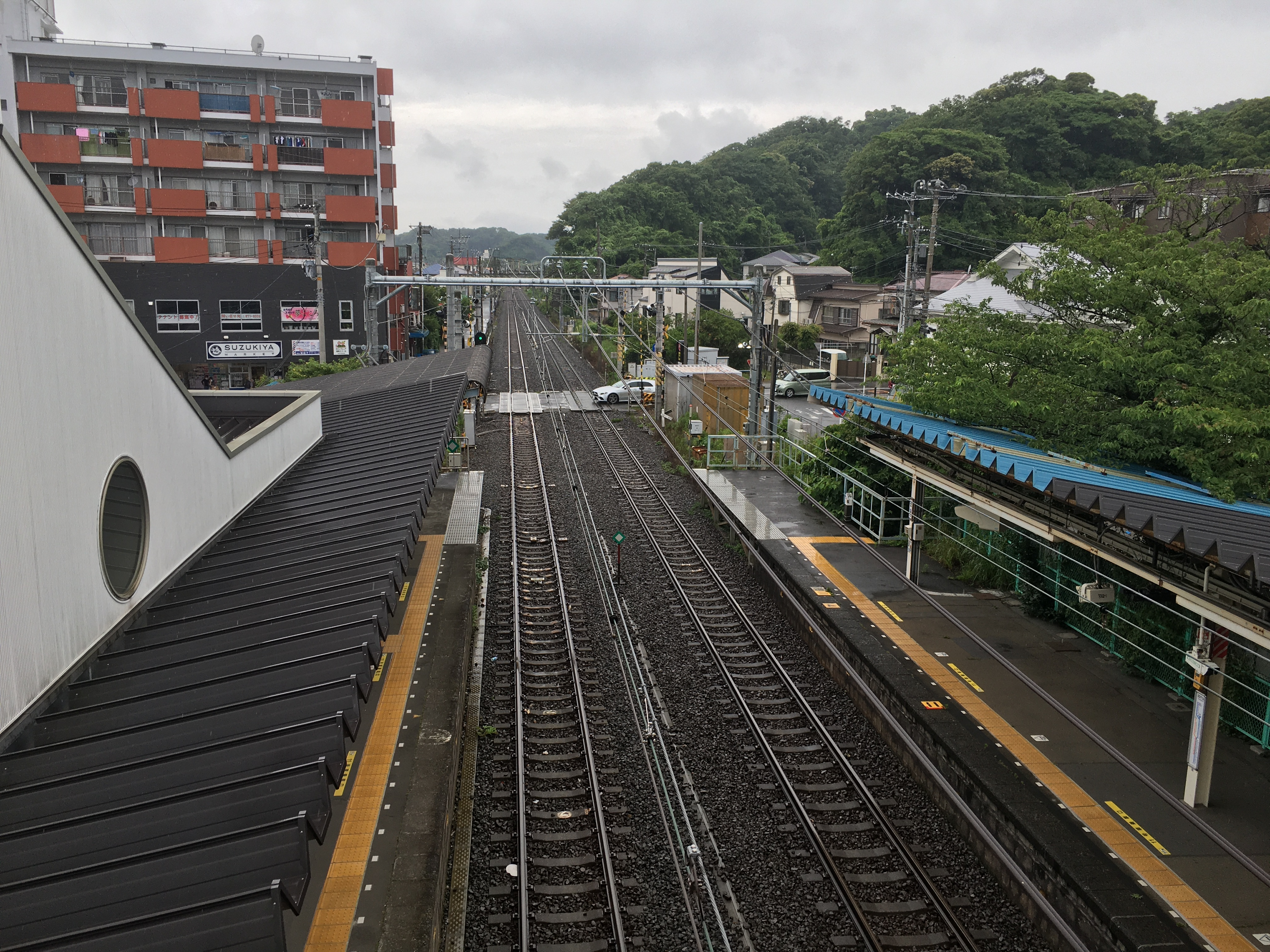
Station platforms, 2021

Higashi-Zushi Station (東逗子駅, Higashi-Zushi-eki) is a passenger railway station in located in the city of Zushi, Kanagawa, Japan, operated by East Japan Railway Company (JR East).

== Lines ==
Higashi-Zushi Station is served by the Yokosuka Line. It is located 10.4 km from the Ōfuna switch point, and 59.8 km from Tokyo Station.

== Station layout ==
The station consists of two opposed side platforms connected to the station building by a footbridge. The station is staffed.

=== Platforms ===
1	Yokosuka Line	for Zushi, Ōfuna, Yokohama, Tokyo, Chiba, and Narita Airport
2	Yokosuka Line	for Yokosuka and Kurihama

== History ==
Higashi-Zushi Station opened on April 1, 1952 as a station on Japan National Railways (JNR). The station came under the management of JR East upon the privatization of the Japan National Railways (JNR) on April 1, 1987. Station operations are now managed by the East Japan Eco Access Co., Ltd under contract from JR East.

== Passenger statistics ==
In fiscal 2019, the station was used by an average of 4,944 passengers daily (boarding passengers only).

The passenger figures (boarding passengers only) for previous years are as shown below.

Fiscal year	daily average
2005	5,359
2010	5,269
2015	5,158

== Surrounding area ==
- Sakurayama Central Park
- Daiichi Sports Park

== See also ==
- List of railway stations in Japan
