= Kinugasa Station =

Railway station in Yokosuka, Kanagawa Prefecture, Japan

JO02 Kinugasa Station 衣笠駅
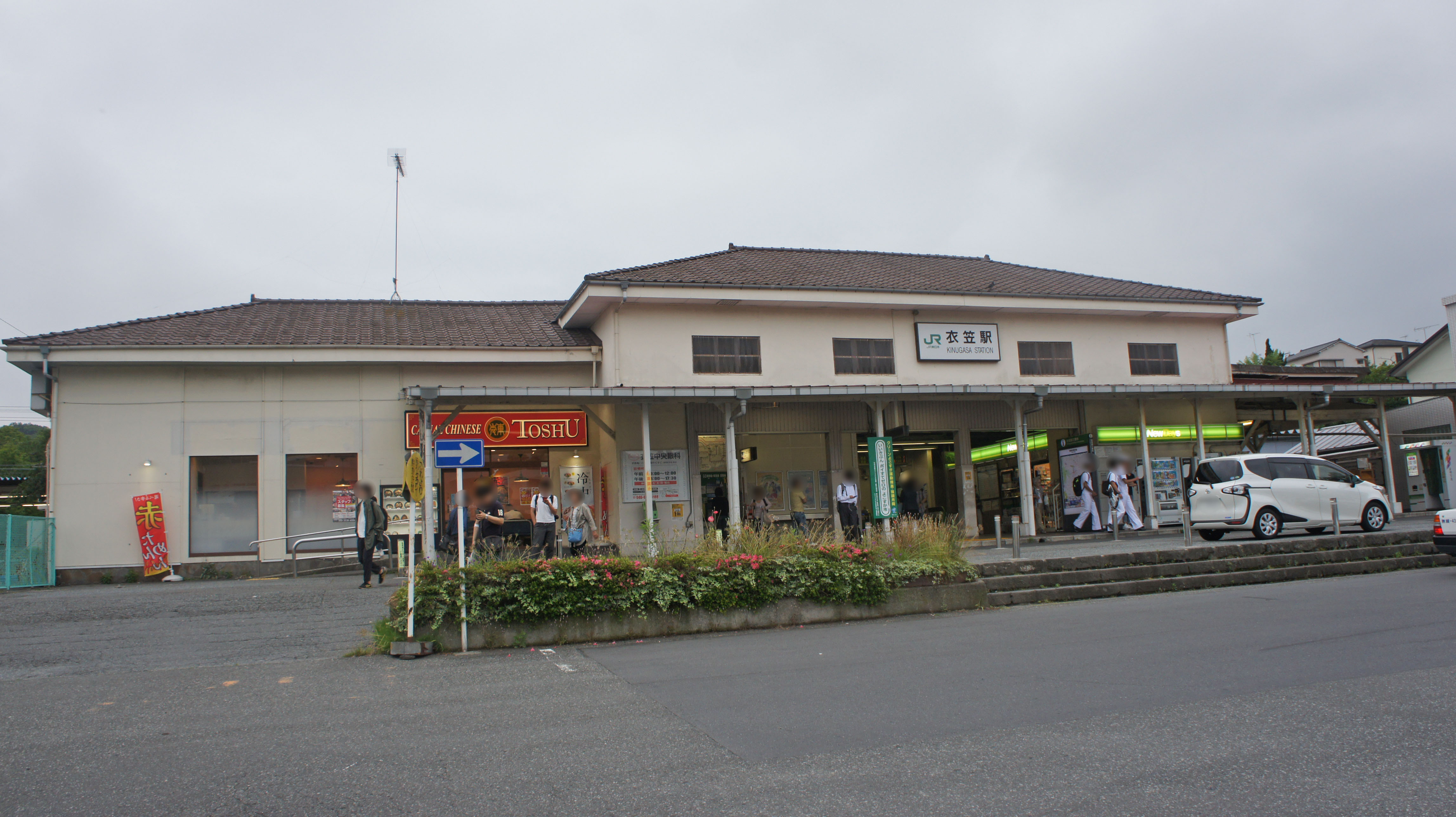
- Kinugasa Station, June 2019

General information
- Location: 2-65 Kinugasa; Yokosuka, Kanagawa; Japan
- Coordinates: 35.2569°N 139.6613°E
- Operator: JR East
- Line: Yokosuka Line
- Distance: 68.7 km (42.7 mi) from Tokyo
- Platforms: 1 island platform
- Connections: Bus terminal

Other information
- Status: Staffed
- Station code: JO02
- Website: Official website

History
- Opened: 1 April 1944

Passengers
- FY2019: 8,369 daily

Services
Preceding station	JR East	Following station
Kurihama JO01 Terminus	Yokosuka Line	Yokosuka JO03 towards Tokyo
Location
- Location within Kanagawa Prefecture Location within Japan

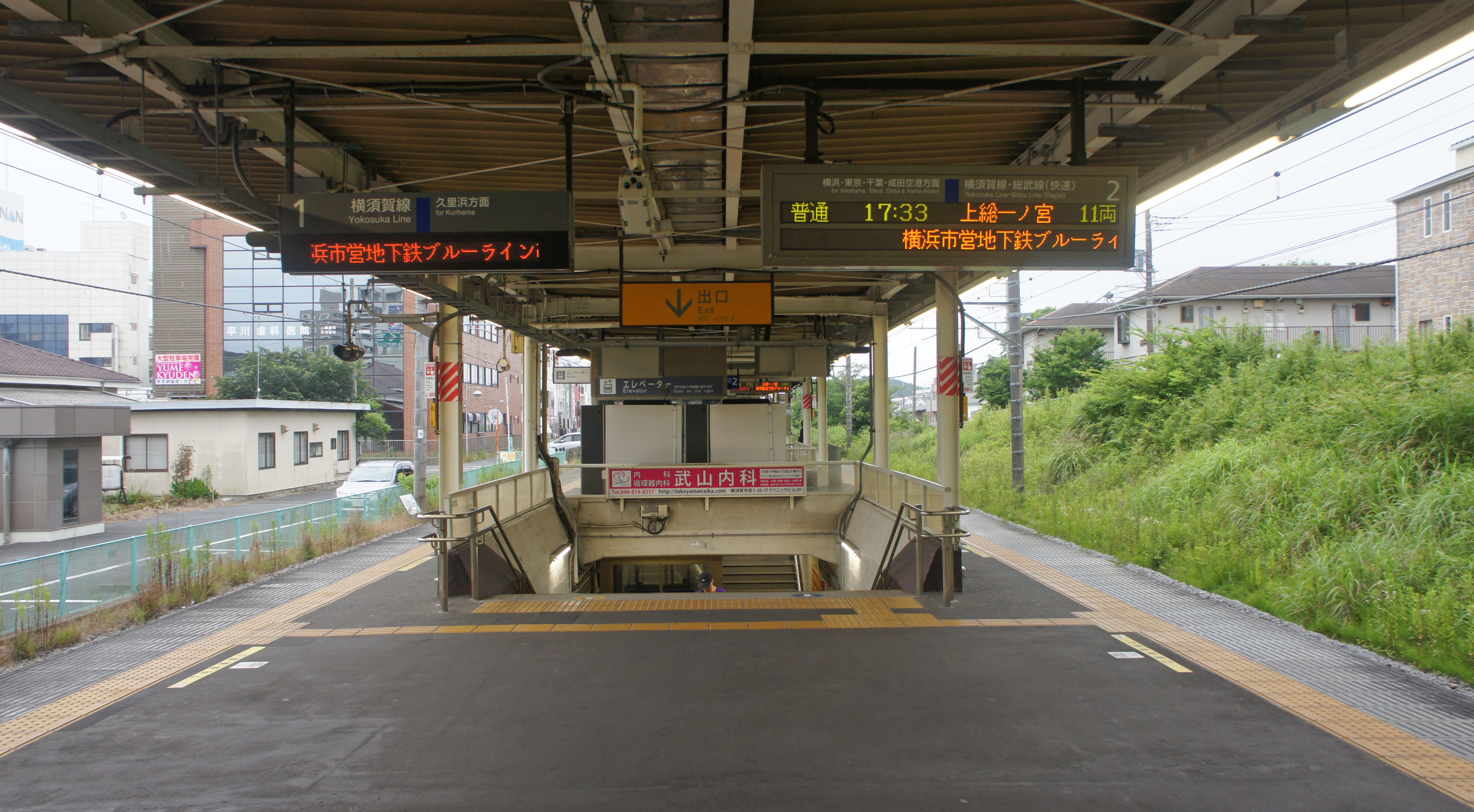
Platform of JR Yokosuka-Line Kinugasa Station

Kinugasa Station (Japanese: 衣笠駅, Hepburn: Kinugasa-eki) is a passenger railway station in located in the city of Yokosuka, Kanagawa, Japan, operated by East Japan Railway Company (JR East).

== Lines ==
Kinugasa Station is served by the Yokosuka Line. It is located 19.3 kilometres (12.0 mi) from Ōfuna Station, and 68.7 kilometres (42.7 mi) from the start of the line at Tokyo Station.

== Station layout ==
The station consists of a single island platform connected to the station building by an underground passage. The station can accommodate trains of up to 11 cars long. Because the Yokosuka line is only one track between the neighboring Yokosuka Station and Kurihama station, trains stop at this station to allow other trains to pass. There was once a short holding track beside the station, but it has been removed. The station is staffed. In an effort to make the station barrier free, a wheelchair-accessible toilet, Braille signs, and elevators have been installed.

=== Platforms ===
1	Yokosuka Line	for Kurihama
2	Yokosuka Line	for Zushi, Ōfuna, Yokohama, Tokyo; Sobu Line (Rapid) for Chiba, Narita Airport

== History ==
Kinugasa Station opened on 1 April 1944 as a station on the Japan National Railways (JNR). Freight operations were discontinued from February 1, 1961. The station came under the management of JR East upon the privatization of the Japan National Railways (JNR) on April 1, 1987. Station operations are now managed by the East Japan Eco Access Co., Ltd under contract from JR East.

== Station layout ==
Kinugasa Station has two tracks and a single island platforms connected to the station building by an underpass.

== Passenger statistics ==
In fiscal 2019, the station was used by an average of 8,369 passengers daily (boarding passengers only).

The passenger figures (boarding passengers only) for previous years are as shown below.

Fiscal year	daily average
2005	9,245
2010	9,087
2015	8,874

== Surrounding area ==
- Kinugasa Castle Ruins
- Kinugasa Hospital
- Kanagawa Prefectural Yokosuka High School
- Miura Gakuen High School (Private)
- Yokosuka City Kinugasa Elementary School

== See also ==
- List of railway stations in Japan
