= Airport Narita =

Japanese train service

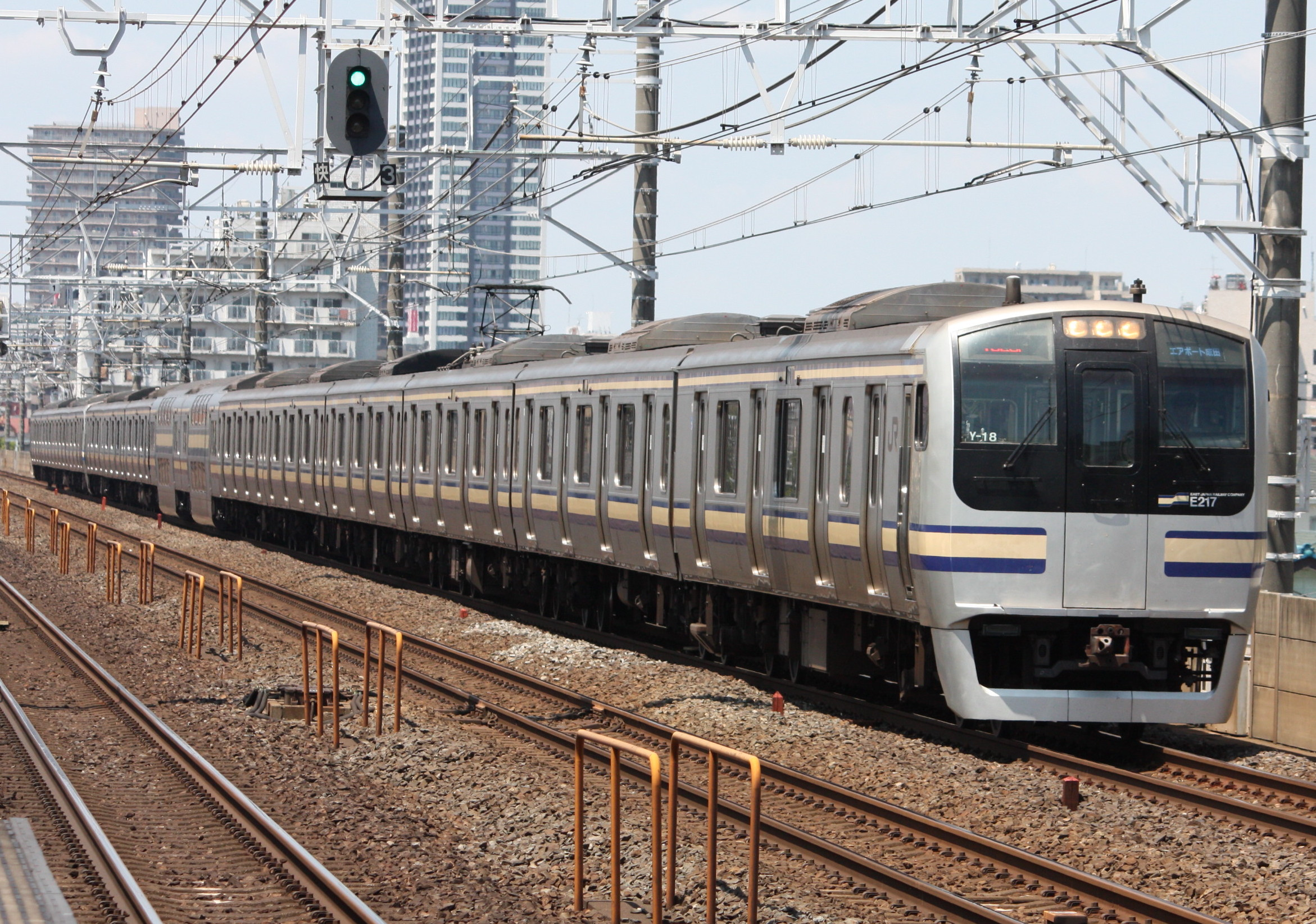
- E217 series EMU on an Airport Narita service, August 2009

Overview
- Service type: Rapid
- Locale: Yokosuka Line, Sōbu line, Narita Line
- First service: 20 April 1991
- Last service: 16 March 2018 (service continues operation today, just without the name)
- Current operator(s): JR East

Route
- Termini: Kurihama; Narita Airport Terminal 1
- Distance travelled: 152.5 km (94.8 mi)

On-board services
- Class(es): Standard + Green
- Seating arrangements: Longitudinal/transverse
- Catering facilities: None

Technical
- Rolling stock: E217 series EMUs
- Track gauge: 1,067 mm (3 ft 6 in)
- Electrification: 1,500 V DC overhead

The Airport Narita (エアポート成田, Eapōto Narita) was the name given to a "Rapid" limited-stop suburban rail service in Greater Tokyo operated since April 1991 by East Japan Railway Company (JR East). It ran from Kurihama to Narita Airport Terminal 1 via the Yokosuka, Sōbu, and Narita lines, with a total length of 152.5 km. Only trains heading towards Narita Airport were identified as Airport Narita; those on the return journey towards Tokyo were unnamed.

== Route ==
=== Kurihama → Ōfuna → Tokyo ===
See Yokosuka Line for local trains.

=== Tokyo → Kinshichō → Chiba ===
See Sōbu Line (Rapid) for rapid trains.

=== Chiba → Sakura → Narita → Narita Airport Terminal 1 ===
Chiba - Tsuga - Yotsukaidō - Monoi - Sakura - Shisui - Narita - Narita Airport Terminal 2·3 - Narita Airport Terminal 1

== Rolling stock ==
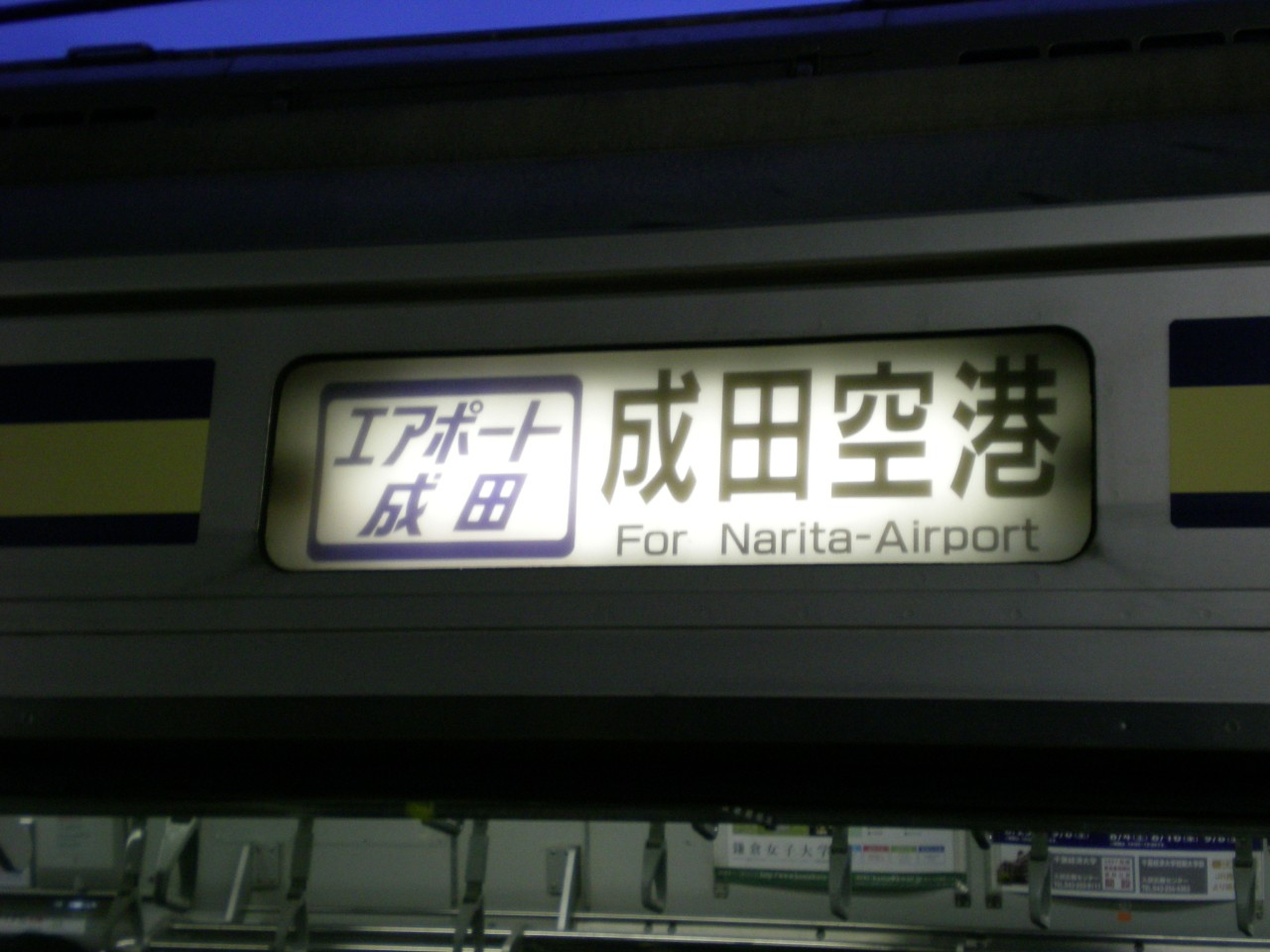
Destination indicator

All Airport Narita services were operated using E217 series electric multiple unit (EMU) trains.

== History ==
The Airport Narita rapid services were introduced from 20 April 1991 to supplement the popular Narita Express limited express services which commenced the previous month. Initially, 16 services ran in each direction daily, using 113 series EMU formations based at Ōfuna and Makuhari depots. Trains including SaRo 124 Green (first class) cars were allocated to these services, as these had expanded luggage storage space.

From the start of the revised timetable on 17 March 2018, the name Airport Narita was discontinued on rapid services to Narita Airport, in order to avoid confusion with the limited express Narita Express services which also serve Narita International Airport. The service itself continues to operate as of 2024, just without the Airport Narita name.

== See also ==
- Narita Express limited express service between destinations in the Tokyo area and Narita Airport
- List of named passenger trains of Japan
