= Yokosuka Line =

Railway line in Tokyo, Japan

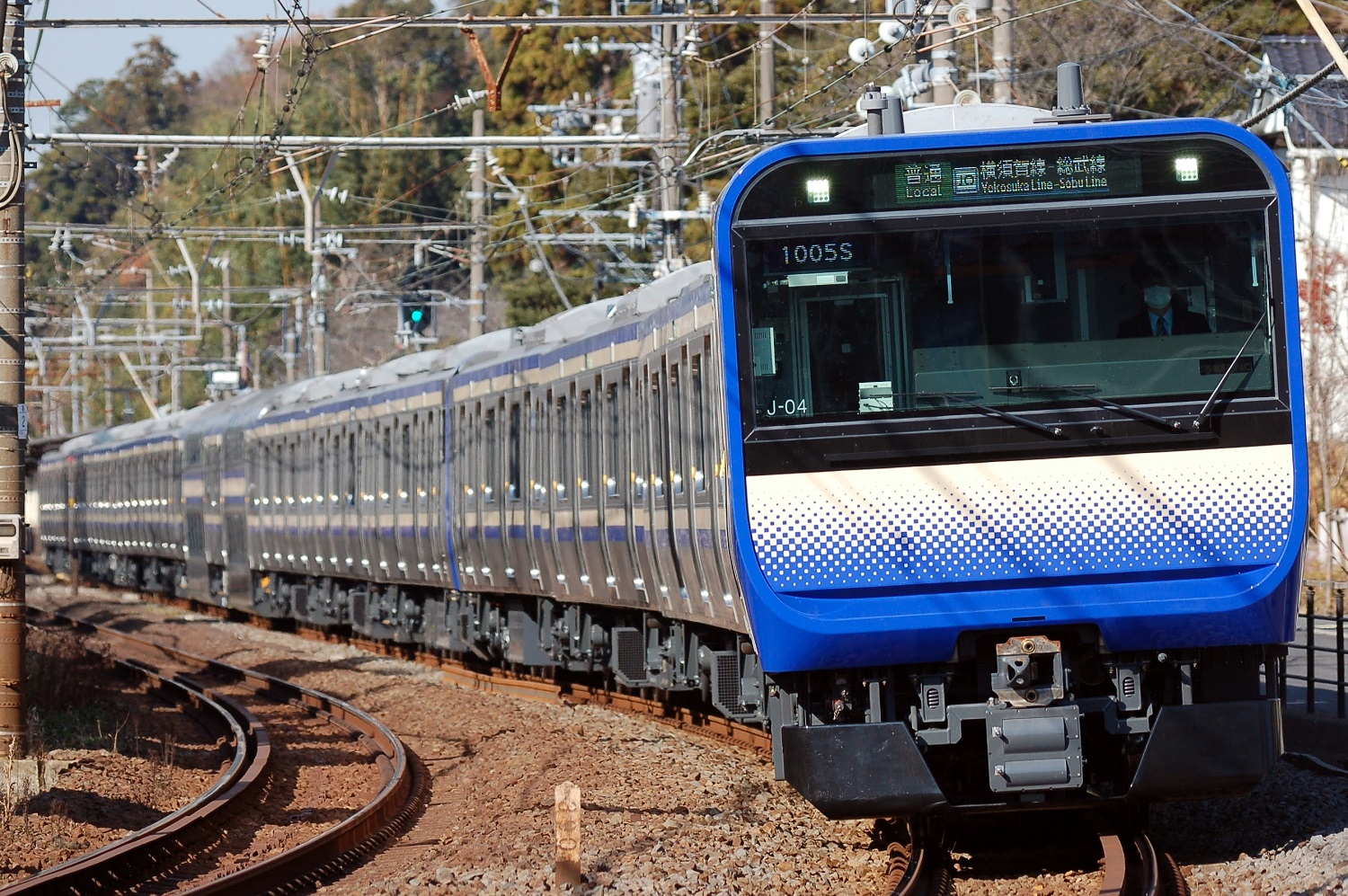
- E235 series in Kita-Kamakura Station

Overview
- Native name: 横須賀線
- Owner: JR East
- Line number: JO
- Locale: Tokyo, Kanagawa Prefecture
- Termini: Tokyo; Kurihama
- Stations: 19
- Color on map: Azure

Service
- Type: Commuter rail
- Operator(s): JR East; JR Freight
- Rolling stock: E231 series EMU; E233 series EMU; E235 series EMU
- Daily ridership: 758,258 (daily 2015)

History
- Opened: 16 June 1889; 137 years ago

Technical
- Line length: 73.3 km (45.5 mi)
- Number of tracks: Double-track
- Track gauge: 1,067 mm (3 ft 6 in)
- Electrification: Overhead line, 1,500 V DC
- Operating speed: 95 km/h (59 mph) (Ōfuna - Yokosuka); 65 km/h (40 mph) (Yokosuka - Kurihama)
- Train protection system: ATS-P
Route map
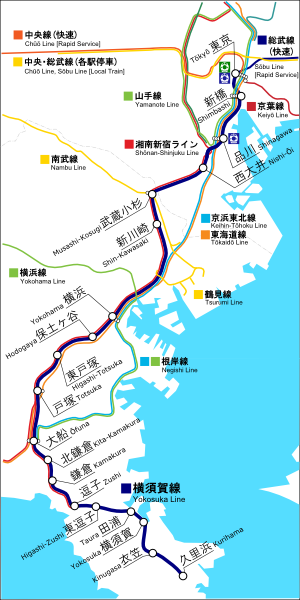

The Yokosuka Line (Japanese: 横須賀線, Hepburn: Yokosuka-sen) is a railway line in Japan operated by the East Japan Railway Company (JR East).

The Yokosuka Line connects Tokyo Station with Kurihama in Yokosuka, Kanagawa. Officially, the name Yokosuka Line is assigned to the 23.9 km (14.9 mi) segment between Ōfuna and Kurihama stations, but the entire route is commonly referred to as the Yokosuka Line by JR East for passenger service.

== Basic data ==
=== Official definition ===
- Operators, distances:
  - East Japan Railway Company (JR East) (Services and tracks)
    - Ōfuna — Kurihama: 23.9 km (14.9 mi)
  - Japan Freight Railway Company (JR Freight) (Services)
    - Ōfuna — Zushi: 8.4 km (5.2 mi)
- Double-tracked section: Ōfuna – Yokosuka
- Railway signalling: Centralized Traffic Control (CTC)

=== Route as operated by JR East ===
- Tokyo — Kurihama: 73.3 km (45.5 mi)
- Double-tracked section: Tokyo – Yokosuka
- Railway signalling: Centralized Traffic Control (CTC)
- Maximum speed: 120 km/h (75 mph)

== Route ==
The Yokosuka Line runs underground between Tokyo and Shinagawa (parallel to the Tōkaidō Main Line, the Yamanote Line and the Keihin-Tōhoku Line) then branches to the west along the Tōkaidō Shinkansen into the city of Kawasaki. (This alignment, technically known as the Hinkaku Line (Japanese: 品鶴線, Japanese pronunciation: [Hinkaku-sen]), was originally built for freight usage; see below.) It rejoins the Tōkaidō Main Line corridor near Tsurumi Station and follows the Tōkaidō Main Line to Ōfuna, where it branches off to the southeast along the original Yokosuka Line toward the Miura Peninsula.

== Services ==
Yokosuka Line local trains make all stops. Most trains have 11 cars, with two of those being Green (first class) cars. Other trains between Tokyo and Zushi are made up of 15 cars—an 11-car set joined to a 4-car set. (Due to shorter platform length at stations south of Zushi, any 15-car trains operated to Kurihama have the first 4 cars detached at Zushi station.) Some day-time trains operate between Zushi and Kurihama and these trains are made up of 4-car set without Green Cars.

Shōnan-Shinjuku Line trains enter or exit the Yokosuka Line at Nishi-Ōi. Utsunomiya–Yokosuka Line through services make all stops on the Yokosuka Line between Nishi-Ōi and Zushi, while Takasaki–Tōkaidō Line through services operate Rapid service within the Yokosuka Line, between Nishi-Ōi and Ōfuna, skipping Nishi-Ōi, Shin-Kawasaki, Hodogaya and Higashi-Totsuka.

For information on the Narita Express and other limited express services, see their respective articles.

The Yokosuka Line has through service onto the Sōbu Line to Chiba and beyond. Some trains travel as far as:

- Kazusa-Ichinomiya on the Sotobō Line
- Kimitsu on the Uchibō Line
- Narita Airport via Narita on the Narita Line
- Kashima-Jingū on the Kashima Line
- Narutō on the Sōbu Main Line

== Station list ==
The section between Yokosuka and Kurihama is single-tracked; trains can only pass one another at Kinugasa and Kurihama stations.

Local trains stop at all stations, from Tokyo to Kurihama. Meanwhile, Shōnan–Shinjuku Line (Utsunomiya–Yokosuka Line) stop at all stations between Nishi-Ōi and Zushi.

Shōnan–Shinjuku Line (Takasaki–Tōkaidō Line) operate Rapid service on the Yokosuka Line.

Legend:

- ● : Trains stop
- | : Trains pass
- ▲ : Shōnan–Shinjuku Line (Takasaki–Tōkaidō Line) trains use Tōkaidō Line platforms

Line	No.	Station	Distance in km (mi)			Shōnan–Shinjuku Line		Transfers	Location	
Line	No.	Station	Between stations	Total		Utsunomiya–Yokosuka Line	Takasaki–Tōkaidō Line	Transfers	Location	
Yokosuka Line Local: Through to Sōbu Line (Rapid) and beyond
Tōkaidō		Tokyo	-	0		Shōnan-Shinjuku Line (for Utsunomiya Line)	Shōnan-Shinjuku Line (for Takasaki Line)	Sōbu Line (Rapid) (through service); Tōhoku Shinkansen; Yamagata Shinkansen; Akita Shinkansen; Jōetsu Shinkansen; Hokuriku Shinkansen; Hokkaido Shinkansen; Chūō Line; Yamanote Line; Keihin-Tōhoku Line; Tōkaidō Main Line; Keiyo Line; Tokaido Shinkansen; Tokyo Metro Marunouchi Line (M-17); Tokyo Metro Tozai Line (Ōtemachi: T-09)	Chiyoda	Tokyo
Tōkaidō		Shimbashi	1.9	1.9		Shōnan-Shinjuku Line (for Utsunomiya Line)	Shōnan-Shinjuku Line (for Takasaki Line)	Yamanote Line; Keihin-Tōhoku Line; Tōkaidō Line; Tokyo Metro Ginza Line (G-08); Toei Asakusa Line (A-10); Yurikamome (U-01)	Minato	Tokyo
Tōkaidō		Shinagawa	4.9	6.8		Shōnan-Shinjuku Line (for Utsunomiya Line)	Shōnan-Shinjuku Line (for Takasaki Line)	Yamanote Line; Keihin-Tōhoku Line; Tōkaidō Line; Tokaido Shinkansen; Keikyu Main Line	Minato	Tokyo
Tōkaidō	JO16	Nishi-Ōi	3.6	10.4		●	｜	Shōnan-Shinjuku Line (for Ōsaki); Through service to Saikyō Line	Shinagawa	Tokyo
Tōkaidō		Musashi-Kosugi	6.4	16.8		●	●	Shōnan-Shinjuku Line; Through service to Sotetsu Line (for Ebina and Shonandai); Nambu Line; Tokyu Toyoko Line; Tokyu Meguro Line	Nakahara-ku, Kawasaki	Kanagawa
Tōkaidō	JO14	Shin-Kawasaki	2.7	19.5		●	｜	Shōnan-Shinjuku Line	Saiwai-ku, Kawasaki	Kanagawa
Tōkaidō	—N/a	Tsurumi	5.1	via Shin- Kawasaki; 24.6	via Kawasaki; 21.7	｜	｜	Official branch point only; no trains serve this station	Tsurumi-ku, Yokohama	Kanagawa
Tōkaidō		Yokohama	7.1	31.7	28.8	●	●	Keihin-Tōhoku Line; Negishi Line; Yokohama Line; Tōkaidō Line; Shōnan-Shinjuku Line; Tokyu Toyoko Line; Keikyū Main Line; Sotetsu Main Line; Yokohama Municipal Subway: Blue Line (B20); Minatomirai Line	Nishi-ku, Yokohama	Kanagawa
Tōkaidō	JO12	Hodogaya	3.0	34.7	31.8	●	｜	Shōnan-Shinjuku Line	Hodogaya-ku, Yokohama	Kanagawa
Tōkaidō	JO11	Higashi-Totsuka	4.9	39.6	36.7	●	｜	Shōnan-Shinjuku Line	Totsuka-ku, Yokohama	Kanagawa
Tōkaidō		Totsuka	4.2	43.8	40.9	●	●	Shōnan-Shinjuku Line; Tōkaidō Line; Yokohama Municipal Subway: Blue Line (B06)	Totsuka-ku, Yokohama	Kanagawa
Tōkaidō		Ōfuna	5.6	49.4	46.5	●	▲	Tōkaidō Line (JT07); Negishi Line (JK01); Shōnan-Shinjuku Line (JS09); Shonan Monorail (SMR1)	Kamakura	Kanagawa
Yokosuka		Ōfuna	5.6	49.4	from Ofuna; 0.0	●	▲	Tōkaidō Line (JT07); Negishi Line (JK01); Shōnan-Shinjuku Line (JS09); Shonan Monorail (SMR1)	Kamakura	Kanagawa
Yokosuka	JO08	Kita-Kamakura	2.3	51.7	2.3	●	Through to Tōkaidō Line	Shōnan-Shinjuku Line	Kamakura	Kanagawa
Yokosuka	JO07	Kamakura	2.2	53.9	4.5	●	Through to Tōkaidō Line	Enoshima Electric Railway (Enoden); Shōnan-Shinjuku Line	Kamakura	Kanagawa
Yokosuka	JO06	Zushi	3.9	57.8	8.4	●	Through to Tōkaidō Line	Keikyū Zushi Line (Zushi·Hayama); Shōnan-Shinjuku Line	Zushi	Kanagawa
Yokosuka	JO05	Higashi-Zushi	2.0	59.8	10.4		Through to Tōkaidō Line		Zushi	Kanagawa
Yokosuka	JO04	Taura	3.4	63.2	13.8		Through to Tōkaidō Line		Yokosuka	Kanagawa
Yokosuka	JO03	Yokosuka	2.1	65.3	15.9		Through to Tōkaidō Line	Keikyū Main Line (Hemi, Shioiri)	Yokosuka	Kanagawa
Yokosuka	JO02	Kinugasa	3.4	68.7	19.3		Through to Tōkaidō Line		Yokosuka	Kanagawa
Yokosuka	JO01	Kurihama	4.6	73.3	23.9		Through to Tōkaidō Line	Keikyū Kurihama Line (Keikyū Kurihama)	Yokosuka	Kanagawa

== Rolling stock ==
Yokosuka Line (through service to the Sōbu Rapid Line)

- E217 series ( December 1994~December 2024)
- E235-1000 series (from 21 December 2020)
- 211 series (from April 1992~ 2012)

Shōnan-Shinjuku Line through service

- E231-1000 series
- E233-3000 series

== History ==
The Yokosuka Line was constructed in response to the request to the Cabinet by the Navy and the Army, dated June 22, 1886, citing the lack of ground transportation to Yokosuka, one of the most important military bases in the country. On April 22, 1887 the Cabinet ordered the Government Railways to build the line with the budget diverted from the fund for the Tōkaidō Line construction. After the survey from July to December 1887, the construction of the railway between Ōfuna and Yokosuka started in January 1888 and completed in June 1889 spending 408,480 yen in total. The operation of the line started on June 16, 1889.

=== Time line of the Yokosuka line ===
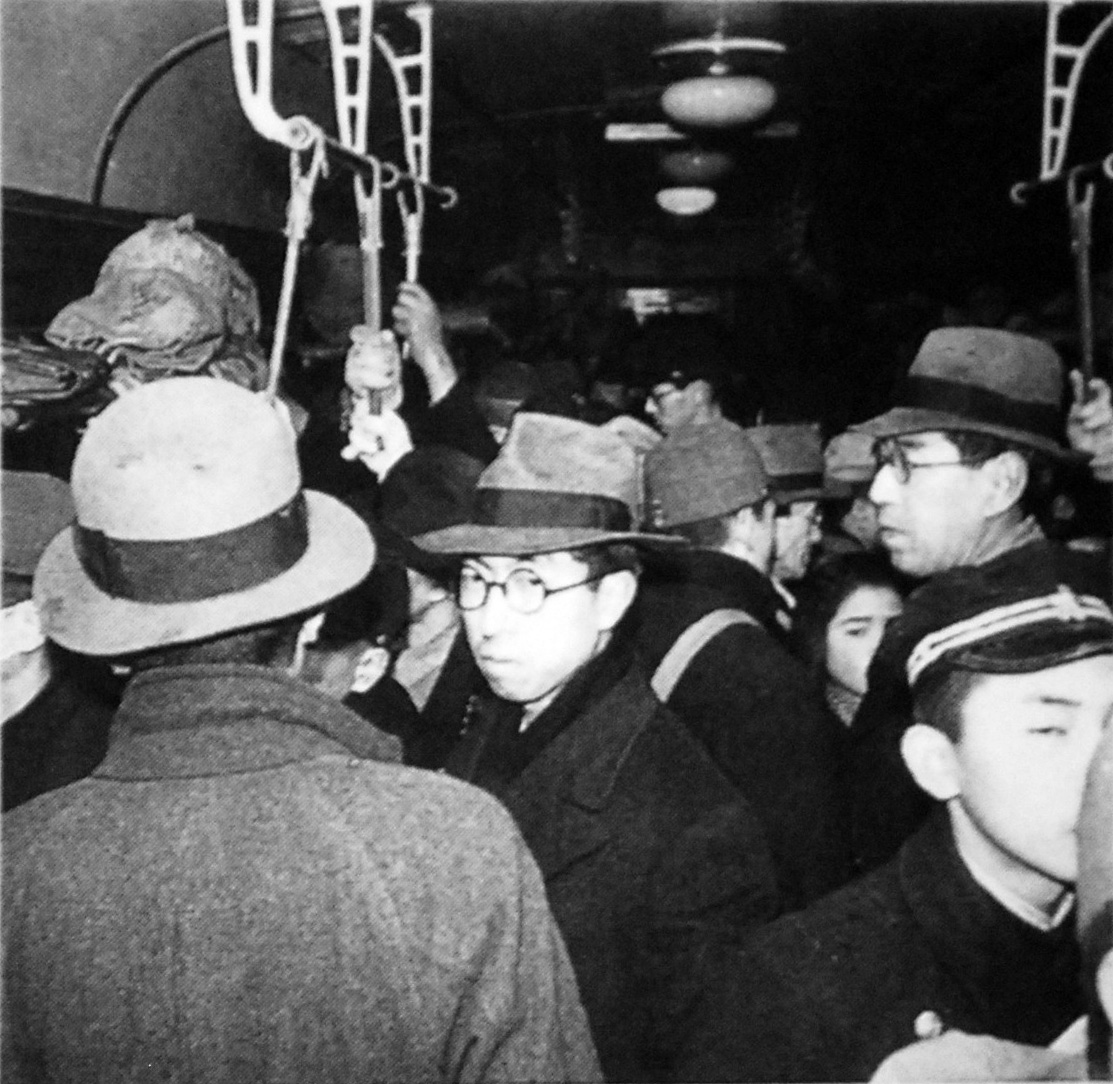
Prince Mikasa on the Yokosuka Line in 1946

- 16 June 1889: Line opens between Ōfuna and Yokosuka with intermediate stations at Kamakura and Zushi
- 1 April 1895: Line becomes part of the Tōkaidō Line
- 1 May 1904: Taura Station opens
- 12 October 1909: Line renamed the Yokosuka Line
- 12 August 1914: Line doubled-tracked between Zushi and Numama Signal Box (newly built between Zushi and Taura)
- 13 September 1916: Line doubled-tracked between Ōfuna and Kamakura
- March 1917: Line doubled-tracked between Kamakura and Zushi
- 20 October 1920: Line doubled-tracked between Numama Signal Box and Taura
- 25 December 1924: Line doubled-tracked between Taura and Yokosuka
- 23 December 1925: Entire line electrified; electric locomotives begin operation between Tokyo and Yokosuka
- 20 May 1927: Kita-Kamakura Station (temporary) opens
- 15 March 1930: Service with electric multiple units (EMU) begins
- 1 October 1930: Kita-Kamakura Station becomes a permanent station
- 1 April 1944: Line was extended to Kurihama; Kinugasa Station opens
- April–August 1945: Sagami-Kanaya Station (temporary) is operated to serve a military base between Yokosuka and Kinugasa
- 1 April 1952: Higashi-Zushi Station opens
- 16 June 1968: Luggage on a Yokosuka Line train exploded near Ōfuna Station, killing one and injuring 14. The culprit, a man in his 20s, testified that he had not meant to kill anyone, but to frighten his ex-fiancée, who had left him for an acquaintance; however, he was ultimately convicted and sentenced to death.
- 1 October 1974: Freight service abolished between Yokosuka and Kurihama
- 1 October 1976: New double-tracked underground line between Tokyo and Shinagawa opens; Sōbu Line (Rapid) trains terminate at Shinagawa
- 1 October 1980: Separated Tōkaidō Line tracks between Tokyo and Ōfuna opened for Yokosuka Line service; Shin-Kawasaki, Higashi-Totsuka stations open; Hodogaya Station served only by Yokosuka Line trains
- 1 February 1984: Freight service abolished between Yokosuka and Zushi
- 2 April 1986: Nishi-Ōi station opens. At the same day, some temporary services which runs between Shinjuku and Zushi begins operation.
- 2 May 1998: Through service to Zushi from the Yokohama and Negishi lines are operated on weekends and holidays
- 1 December 2001: Shōnan-Shinjuku Line begins operation
- 16 October 2004: Major revision of Shōnan-Shinjuku Line services; Shinjuku-terminating trains abolished
- 1 May 2006: JR Freight ceases operations between Taura and Zushi
- 15 March 2008: Weekend/holiday through service to Zushi from the Yokohama and Negishi lines is abolished; new Yokosuka Line platform installed at Shinagawa Station
- 13 March 2010: Yokosuka Line service at Musashi-Kosugi Station commences
- 13 March 2015: Ohayō Liner Zushi and Home Liner Zushi are discontinued.
- 20 August 2016: Station numbering was introduce with stations being assigned station numbers between JO01 and JO19. Numbers increase towards in the northbound direction towards Tokyo.
- 17 March 2018: Airport Narita services are discontinued.
- 6 and 7 June 2026: service is cancelled all day due to tunneling construction work. At Shinagawa Station, the train will perform a Turnback operation in the Kurihama area.

=== Hinkaku Line ===
The Hinkaku Line (品鶴線, Hinkaku-sen) was originally built to divert freight traffic from the busy Tōkaidō Main Line, providing an alternate route between Tokyo and Tsurumi. After a 1967 explosion, freight trains were banned from portions of the central Tokyo rail network, providing the impetus for the construction of the orbital Musashino Line. The new Musashino Line was connected to the Hinkaku Line roughly 6 km (3.7 mi) north of Tsurumi Station near Musashi-Kosugi, siphoning off nearly all freight traffic after its opening in 1975. This left a substantial chunk of the double-tracked, mostly grade-separated Hinkaku Line disused.

In order to put the line back into passenger service, a new 6 km (3.7 mi) track was installed between Tsurumi Station and the Musashino Line, where it was connected to the now-disused portion of the Hinkaku Line. Two new stations were constructed: one (Shin-Kawasaki) adjacent to the existing Kashimada Station on the Nambu Line in 1980 and another at Nishi-Ōi in 1986. Musashi-Kosugi Station, the third station in this section, opened in 2010; it provides a transfer to the Nambu Line as well as the Tōkyū Tōyoko and Meguro lines.

== See also ==
- Sōbu Line (Rapid)
