= Yokosuka Station =

Railway station in Yokosuka, Kanagawa Prefecture, Japan

JO03 Yokosuka Station 横須賀駅
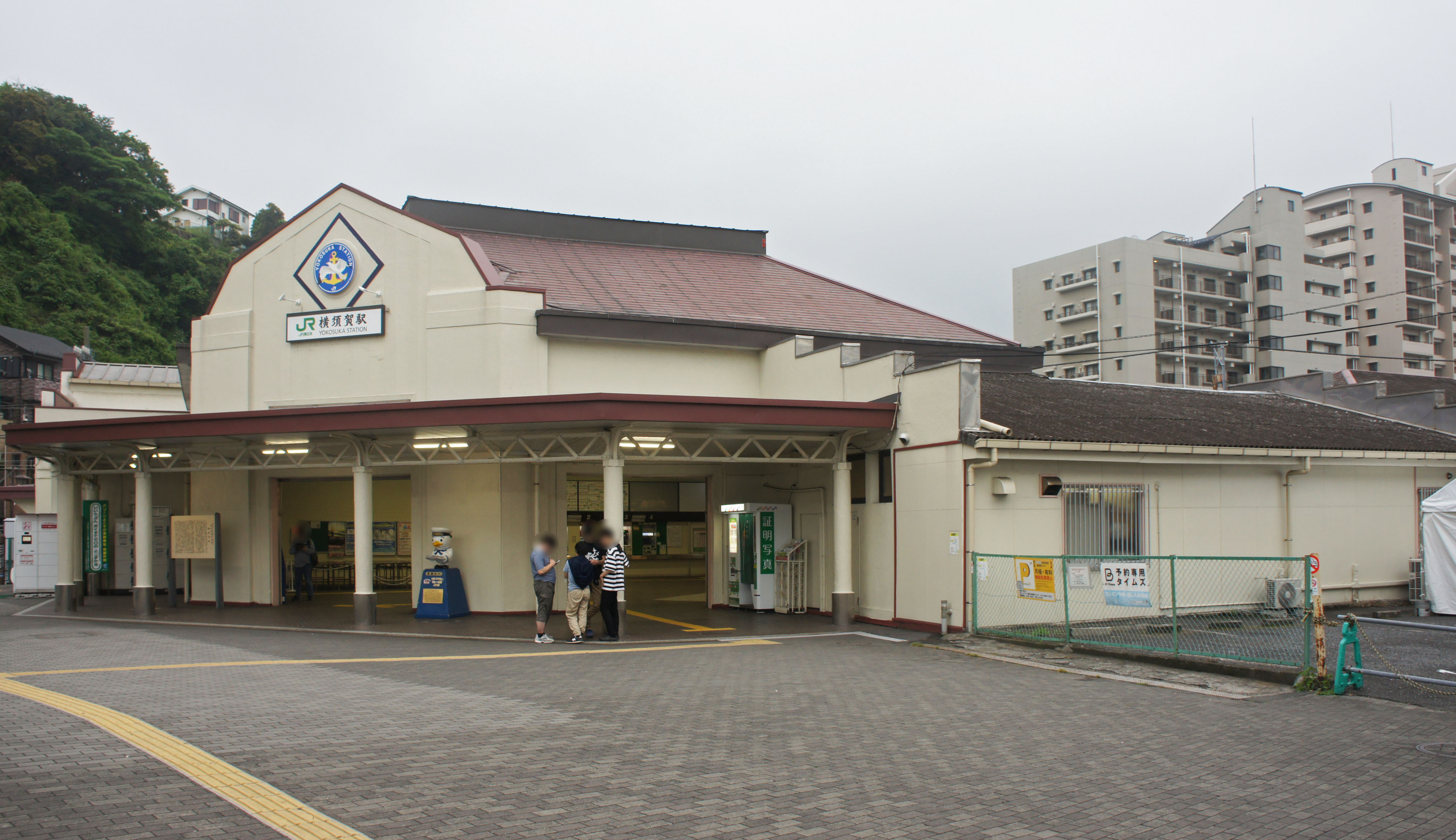
- Yokosuka Station

General information
- Location: 1-1 Hemi-cho; Yokosuka, Kanagawa; Japan
- Coordinates: 35°17′03″N 139°39′18″E]
- Operator: JR East
- Line: Yokosuka Line
- Distance: 65.3 km (40.6 mi) from Tokyo
- Platforms: 1 bay + 1 side platform
- Connections: Bus terminal

Other information
- Status: Staffed (Midori no Madoguchi)
- Station code: JO03
- Website: Official website

History
- Opened: 16 June 1889

Passengers
- FY2019: 4,845 daily

Services
Preceding station	JR East	Following station
Kinugasa JO02 towards Kurihama	Yokosuka Line	Taura JO04 towards Tokyo
Location
- Location within Kanagawa Prefecture Location within Japan

Yokosuka Station (Japanese: 横須賀駅, Hepburn: Yokosuka-eki) is a passenger railway station in located in the city of Yokosuka, Kanagawa, Japan, operated by East Japan Railway Company (JR East).

== Lines ==
Yokosuka Station is served by the Yokosuka Line. It is located 15.9 kilometres (9.9 mi) from Ōfuna Station, and 65.3 kilometres (40.6 mi) from the start of the line at Tokyo Station.

== Station layout ==
The station consists of a bay platform and a side platform serving three tracks. Platform 1, formerly used for freight operations, is currently not in use. Platform 2 is used for trains which originate or terminate at Yokosuka, and Platform 3 is for bi-directional traffic. The station has a Midori no Madoguchi staffed ticket office.

=== Platforms ===
2	Yokosuka Line	for Zushi, Ōfuna, Yokohama, Tokyo, Chiba, Narita Airport
3	Yokosuka Line	for Zushi, Ōfuna, Yokohama, Tokyo, Chiba, Narita Airport
3	Yokosuka Line	for Kinugasa and Kurihama

== History ==
Yokosuka Station opened on June 16, 1889 as the initial terminal station on the Japanese Government Railways (JGR) spur line from Ōfuna to serve the Yokosuka Naval Arsenal and related Imperial Japanese Navy facilities at Yokosuka. This spur line was renamed the Yokosuka Line on October 12, 1909. The present station building, the third building on this site was completed in April, 1940 and the line extended past Yokosuka to Kurihama Station in 1944. Freight operations were discontinued from February 1, 1984. The station came under the management of JR East upon the privatization of the Japanese National Railways (JNR) on April 1, 1987.

== Passenger statistics ==
In fiscal 2019, the station was used by an average of 4,845 passengers daily (boarding passengers only).

The passenger figures (boarding passengers only) for previous years are as shown below.

Fiscal year	daily average
2005	6,159
2010	5,852
2015	5,583

== Surrounding area ==
- Verny Park
- United States Fleet Activities Yokosuka
- Yokosuka Arts Theatre
- Midorigaoka Girls' Junior and Senior High School

== See also ==
- List of railway stations in Japan
