= Zushi Station =

Railway station in Kanagawa, Japan

JO06 JS06 Zushi Station 逗子駅
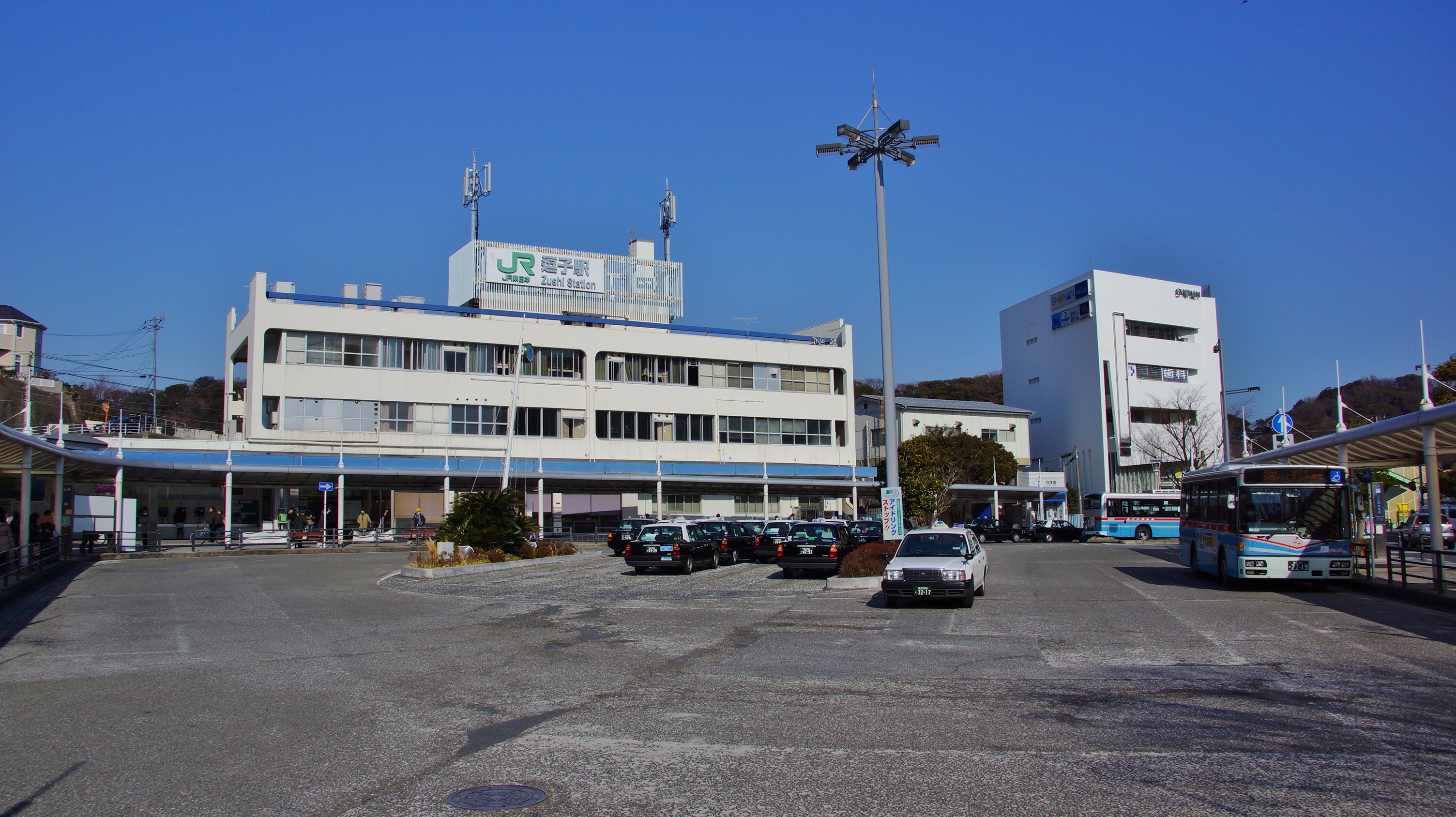
- Zushi Station forecourt in January 2014

General information
- Location: 1 Zushi, Zushi-shi, Kanagawa-ken 249-0006; Japan
- Coordinates: 35°17′51.03″N 139°34′46.29″E
- Operator: JR East; JR Freight
- Lines: Yokosuka Line; Shōnan-Shinjuku Line
- Distance: 68.7 km from Tokyo
- Platforms: 1 island + 1 side platform

Other information
- Status: Staffed (Midori no Madoguchi)
- Station code: JO06, JS06
- Website: Official website

History
- Opened: June 16, 1889

Passengers
- FY2019: 28,798 daily

Services
Preceding station	JR East	Following station
Higashi-Zushi JO05 towards Kurihama	Yokosuka Line	Kamakura JO07 towards Tokyo
Terminus	Shōnan–Shinjuku Line Rapid Local	Kamakura JS07 towards Utsunomiya
Location
- Location within Kanagawa Prefecture Location within Japan

Zushi Station (逗子駅, Zushi-eki) is a passenger railway station on the Yokosuka Line in Zushi, Kanagawa, Japan, operated by the East Japan Railway Company (JR East).

== Lines ==
Zushi Station is served by the Yokosuka Line and also by Shōnan-Shinjuku Line through services. It lies 8.4 kilometers from the junction at Ōfuna Station, and 57.8 kilometers from Tokyo Station.

The station is also used by rolling stock delivered from the J-TREC factory in Kanazawa-ku, Yokohama via a JR Freight connecting line immediately south of the station.

== Station layout ==
Zushi Station has an island platform and a side platform serving three tracks. Platform 1 is used for trains which originate or terminate at Zushi. The platforms are connected by two overpasses. The station has entrances on the north and south sides, designated "west" and "east" respectively. In August 2007, escalator and elevator facilities were completed and a new overpass was opened on the eastern (Higashi-Zushi) side. The west exit was moved somewhat to the west.

There is a Midori no Madoguchi staffed ticket office, automatic ticket vending machines, reserved ticket vending machines, automatic ticket gates, and automatic fare adjustment machines. Also, in the station, outside the ticket gates, there is a Newdays convenience store and a kōban (police box).

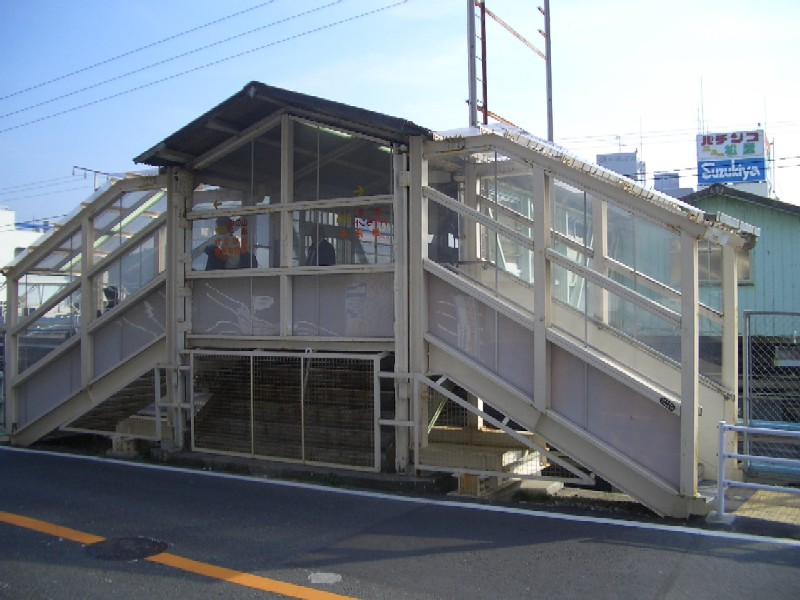
The former "west" entrance on the north side of the station in November 2004

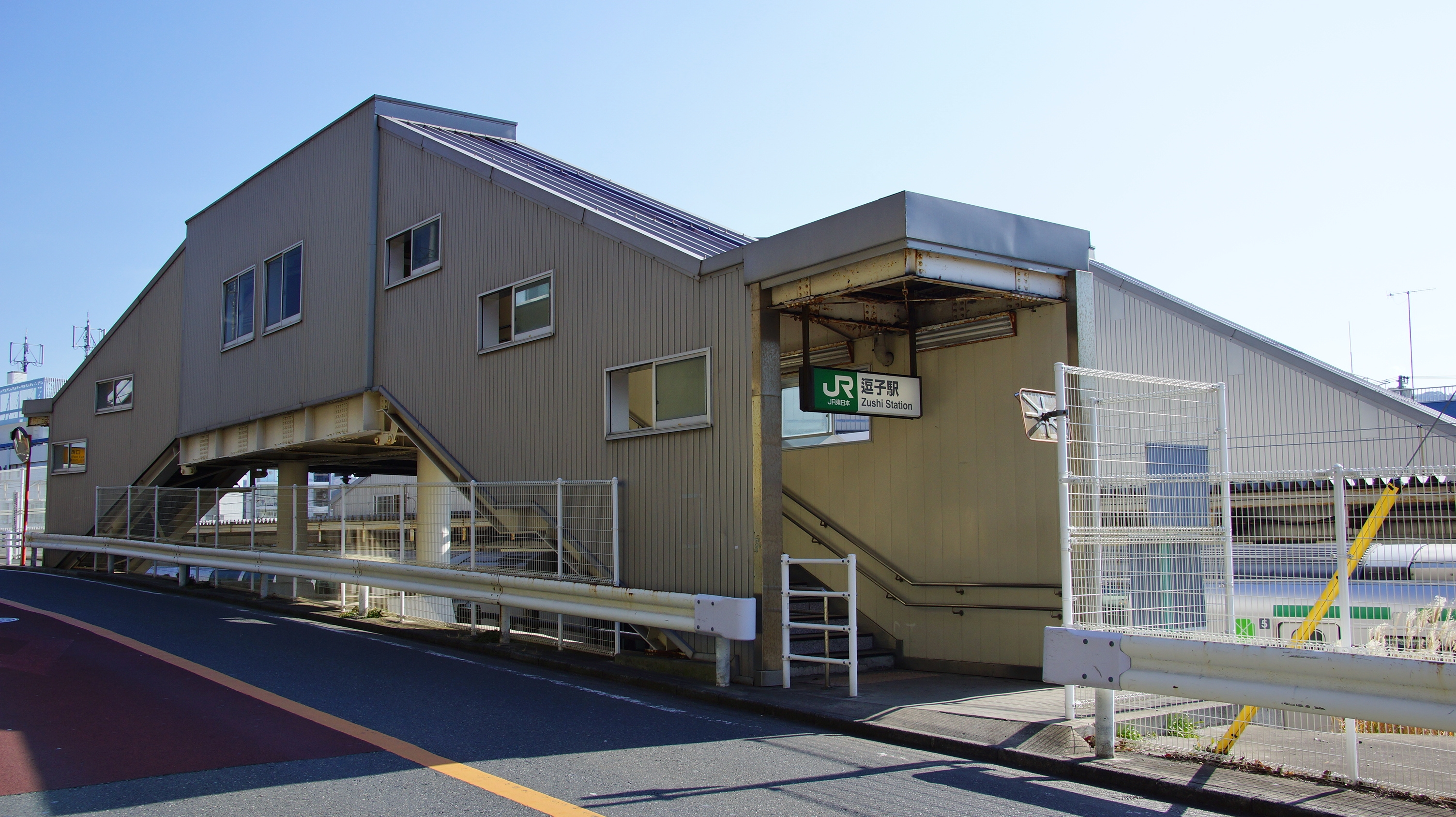
The new "west" entrance on the north side of the station in January 2014

=== Platforms ===
1	Yokosuka Line	for Ōfuna, Yokohama, Tokyo, Chiba; Narita Line for Narutō / Narita Airport (via Chiba); Uchibō Line for Kimitsu (via Chiba)
1	Shonan-Shinjuku Line	for Shibuya, Shinjuku, Ikebukuro, Ōmiya, and Utsunomiya
2	Yokosuka Line	for Ōfuna, Yokohama, Tokyo, Chiba; Narita Line for Narutō / Narita Airport (via Chiba); Uchibō Line for Kimitsu (via Chiba)
2	Yokosuka Line	for Yokosuka, and Kurihama
2	Shonan-Shinjuku Line	for Shibuya, Shinjuku, Ikebukuro, Ōmiya, and Utsunomiya
3	Yokosuka Line	for Ōfuna, Yokohama, Tokyo, Chiba; Narita Line for Narutō / Narita Airport (via Chiba); Uchibō Line for Kimitsu (via Chiba)
3	Yokosuka Line	for Yokosuka, and Kurihama

- 15-car Yokosuka Line trains bound for Kurihama have to split into 11-car and 4-car segments, as the section between Higashi-Zushi and Kurihama only allow at most 11-car trains (10-car at Taura), with the 11-car segment continuing onwards to Kurihama.

== History ==
Zushi Station opened on June 16, 1889. The present station building, the third building on this site was completed in March 1969. The station came under the management of JR East upon the privatization of the Japanese National Railways (JNR) on April 1, 1987. Shonan-Shinjuku Line services started on 1 December 2001.

== Passenger statistics ==
In fiscal 2019, the station was used by an average of 28,798 passengers daily (boarding passengers only). The passenger figures for previous years are as shown below.

Fiscal year	Daily average
2000	26,767
2005	26,946
2010	28,708
2015	29,146

== Surrounding area ==
- Zushi·Hayama Station ( Keikyu Zushi Line)
- Zushi City Hall
- Seiwa Gakuin Junior & Senior High School
- Zushi Kasei Junior & Senior High School

== See also ==
- List of railway stations in Japan
