= Kurihama Station =

Railway station in Yokosuka, Kanagawa Prefecture, Japan

JO01 Kurihama Station 久里浜駅
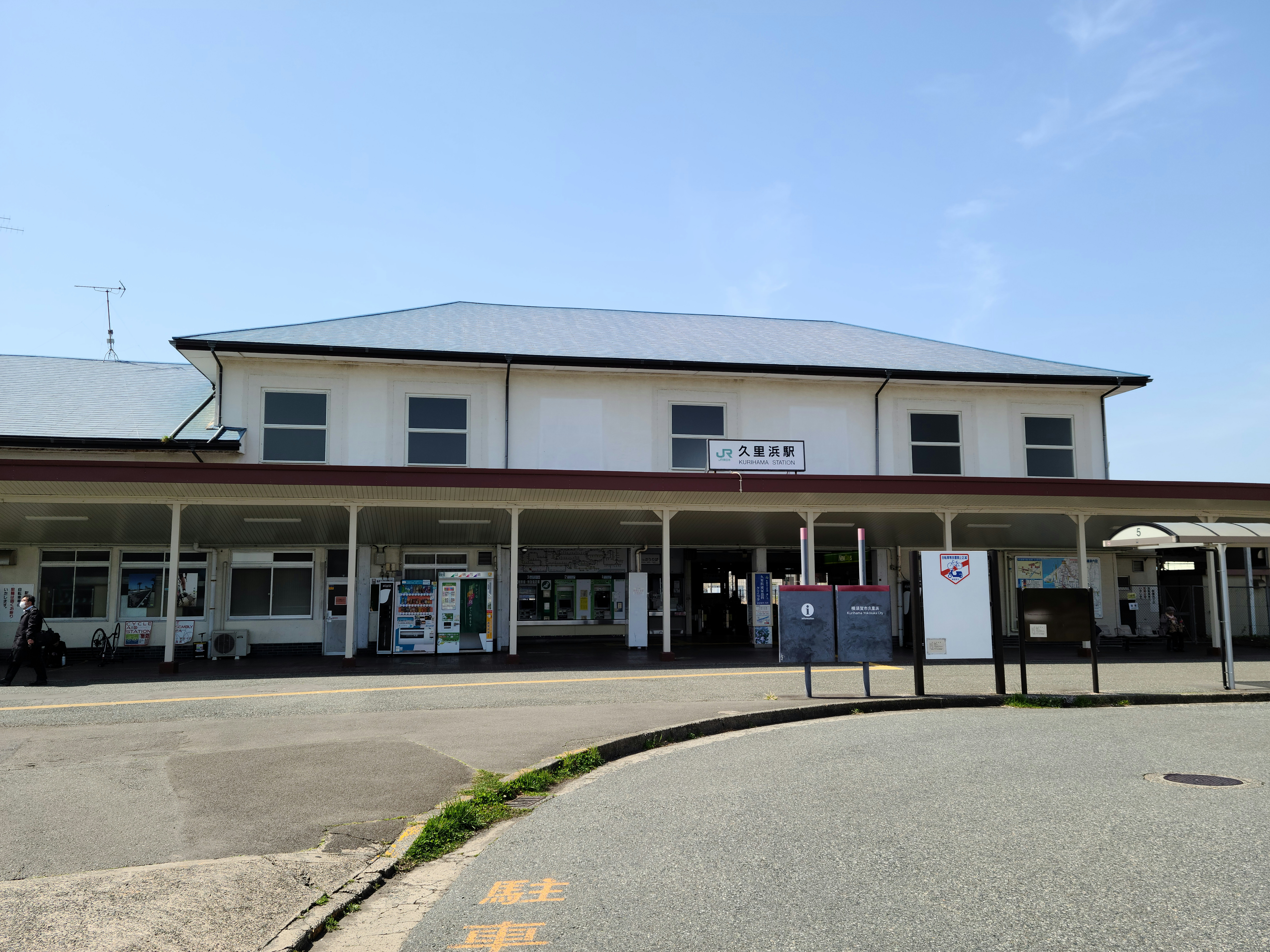
- Kurihama Station, March 2021

General information
- Location: 1 Kurihama; Yokosuka, Kanagawa; Japan
- Coordinates: 35°13′59″N 139°42′03″E
- Operator: JR East
- Line: Yokosuka Line
- Distance: 73.2 km (45.5 mi) from Tokyo
- Platforms: 1 island platform
- Connections: Bus terminal

Other information
- Status: Staffed (Midori no Madoguchi)
- Station code: JO01
- Website: Official website

History
- Opened: 1 April 1944

Passengers
- FY2019: 6,338 daily

Services
Preceding station	JR East	Following station
Terminus	Yokosuka Line	Kinugasa JO02 towards Tokyo
Location
- Location within Kanagawa Prefecture Location within Japan

Kurihama Station (Japanese: 久里浜駅, Hepburn: Kurihama-eki) is a passenger railway station in located in the city of Yokosuka, Kanagawa, Japan, operated by East Japan Railway Company (JR East).

== Lines ==
Kurihama Station is served by the Yokosuka Line. It is the southern terminus of the line and is located 23.9 kilometres (14.9 mi) from Ōfuna Station, and 73.2 kilometres (45.5 mi) from the start of the line at Tokyo Station. It is also located 3 minutes' walk from Keikyū Kurihama Station on the Keikyū Kurihama Line.

== Station layout ==
Kurihama Station has a single island platform connected to the station building by a footbridge. The station has a Midori no Madoguchi staffed ticket office.

=== Platforms ===
1/2	Yokosuka Line	for Zushi, Ōfuna, Yokohama, Tokyo, Chiba, and Narita Airport

== History ==
Kurihama Station opened on 1 April 1944 as a station on the Japanese Government Railways (JGR), the pre-war predecessor to the Japanese National Railways (JNR). Freight operations were discontinued from October 1, 1974. The station came under the management of JR East upon the privatization of JNR on April 1, 1987. The station was served by Shōnan-Shinjuku Line trains when the new service started in December 2001, but services as far as Kurihama were discontinued from October 2004.

== Passenger statistics ==
In fiscal 2019, the station was used by an average of 6,338 passengers daily (boarding passengers only).

The passenger figures (boarding passengers only) for previous years are as shown below.

Fiscal year	daily average
2005	6,901
2010	6,876
2015	6,767

== Surrounding area ==
Kurihama Station is adjacent to JR East's Yokohama Training Center.

== See also ==
- List of railway stations in Japan
