= 18×2 Beyond Youthful Days =

2024 Taiwanese-Japanese film by Michihito Fujii

- Theatrical release poster
- Directed by: Michihito Fujii
- Written by: Michihito Fujii; Hirokawa Hayashida
- Produced by: Chang Chen
- Starring: Greg Hsu; Kaya Kiyohara
- Cinematography: Keisuke Imamura
- Edited by: Tatsuma Furukawa
- Music by: Takashi Ohmama
- Production companies: Jump! Boys; Babel Label
- Distributed by: Happinet Phantom Studios (Japan); Activator Co.(Taiwan)
- Release dates: 14 February 2024 (Ambassador Theatres Taipei); 14 March 2024 (Taiwan); 3 May 2024 (Japan)
- Running time: 124 minutes
- Countries: Taiwan; Japan
- Languages: Mandarin; Japanese

18×2 Beyond Youthful Days is a 2024 romance film directed by Michihito Fujii and produced by Chang Chen. Starring Greg Hsu and Kaya Kiyohara, alongside an ensemble cast including Joseph Chang, Shunsuke Michieda, Haru Kuroki, Hitomi Kuroki, and Yutaka Matsushige, the film follows a recently fired Taiwanese video game developer (Hsu) on a solo trip to Japan, reminiscing about a past romantic entanglement with a Japanese backpacker (Kiyohara) that never blossomed into a relationship.

Adapted from a web travelogue by Taiwanese video game developer Jimmy Lai in 2014, the film was stuck in development hell before Japanese filmmaker Michihito Fujii joined the project in 2019, turning it into a collaborative film between Taiwan and Japan. Fujii spent four years penning the screenplay, while lead actors Hsu and Kiyohara were announced to be part of the production in March 2023. Principal photography commenced in Japan in the same month and continued in Taiwan in April. Following the completion of filming in May 2023, the film underwent six months of post-production.

The film held its world premiere at Ambassador Theatres Taipei, on 14 February 2024, followed by a theatrical release on 14 March and 3 May in Taiwan and Japan, respectively. It performed well at the box office and received generally positive reviews from critics, particularly for the acting and aesthetics, but the writing faced criticism. The film also secured four nominations in the 61st Golden Horse Awards.

== Plot ==
Jimmy, the founder of a video game development studio, gets fired from his own company during a board meeting. Devastated, he returns to his hometown of Tainan. While tidying his room, he stumbles upon a postcard he received 18 years ago from his dear Japanese friend Ami. He then receives a phone call from the studio co-founder, who invites him on the final business trip to Tokyo. After the business meeting, Jimmy embarks on a solo trip without a destination in Japan.

Jimmy's thoughts drift back 18 years to when he works at the struggling Karaoke Kobe in Tainan during the summer before university. He meets Ami, a new employee and Japanese backpacker looking for a working place to save up money for an upcoming journey. Assigned to show her around, Jimmy interacts with Ami and becomes romantically interested in her. During the welcoming meal, Ami is asked about her trip. She explains that she plans to go on a trip without a destination and shows her sketchbook of drawings recording her previous footsteps in Taiwan. Impressed, Jimmy suggests she decorate a wall at the karaoke. After the meal, Ami expresses her interest in motorcycles, and Jimmy rides her to an observation deck with a stunning view of Tainan. They bond and discuss their dreams. Jimmy confesses his uncertainty, and Ami encourages him to search for a dream.

In the present, Jimmy arrives in Matsumoto and encounters Liu, a Taiwanese izakaya owner who suggests that he visits Ami's hometown, Tadami. On his journey, he meets a young backpacker named Koji on the Iiyama Line, who recommends they stop at the snowing Nagaoka, where Jimmy is captivated by the scenery, reminiscent of a classic romance film Love Letter. Jimmy recalls that his co-workers asked Ami to describe her ideal boyfriend, but her description contradicts Jimmy's characteristics. However, a co-worker encourages him to date her anyway and gives him tickets to Love Letter. During the movie, Ami cries miserably and finds an excuse to leave the scene, leaving Jimmy confused.

Back in the present, Jimmy meets and befriends Yukiko, a staff member at an internet café who is playing the game he developed. Yukiko offers to drive him to the sky lantern festival. Jimmy then recalls Ami's sudden departure, and her subsequent announcement of returning to Japan. Jimmy is furious with Ami and refuses to talk to her, even when she finishes the wall art. However, encouraged by his father's advice to leave no regrets, Jimmy decides to ask Ami out one last time before she leaves and takes her to a sky lantern festival. They make a promise to meet each other again after they have the opportunity to pursue and fulfill their dreams.

Upon arriving in Tadami, Jimmy meets Ami's mother, Yuko, who reveals Ami's passing. Yuko gives Jimmy Ami's sketchbook, which contains drawings of Taiwan. Through the drawings, it is revealed that Ami had been suffering from cardiomyopathy and had wished to travel around the world during the final days of her life. However, after meeting and falling in love with Jimmy in Taiwan, her desire to continue living is ignited, and she decides to seek alternative treatments in Japan. Therefore, she abruptly leaves Taiwan before her condition deteriorates and refuses Jimmy's requests to see her in later years while she is hospitalized. Overwhelmed, Jimmy weeps as he reaches the last page of the sketchbook—a picture of them releasing sky lanterns, symbolizing their promise.

On his journey back, Jimmy writes a letter to Ami, sharing his life since their separation. He reveals that he was aware of Ami's passing after completing his first game, where he fulfilled his promise to achieve his dream and attempted to reach out to her, but to no avail. Jimmy expresses his gratitude for Ami's presence in his youthful days at the end of the letter, and promises to go on a trip without a destination in her honor.

== Cast ==
- Greg Hsu as Jimmy, a successful former video game developer who went on a trip to Japan
- Kaya Kiyohara as Ami, a Japanese backpacker romantically entwined with Jimmy 18 years ago
- Joseph Chang as Liu, the Taiwanese owner of a Matsumoto-based izakaya
- Shunsuke Michieda as Koji, a young backpacker
- Haru Kuroki as Yukiko, an internet café staff member
- Hitomi Kuroki as Yuko, Ami's mother
- Yutaka Matsushige as Nakazato, a resident at Tadami who drives Jimmy to Yuko

Also appearing in the film are Toyoharu Kitamura as Shimada, the Japanese boss of Karaoke Kobe; Buffy Chen as Hsiao-ting, Jane Liao as Shu-yi, Lee Kuan-yi as Wei, the co-workers of Jimmy and Ami at Karaoke Kobe; and Figaro Tseng as Aaron, the co-founder of Jimmy's video game development studio.

== Production ==
=== Conception ===
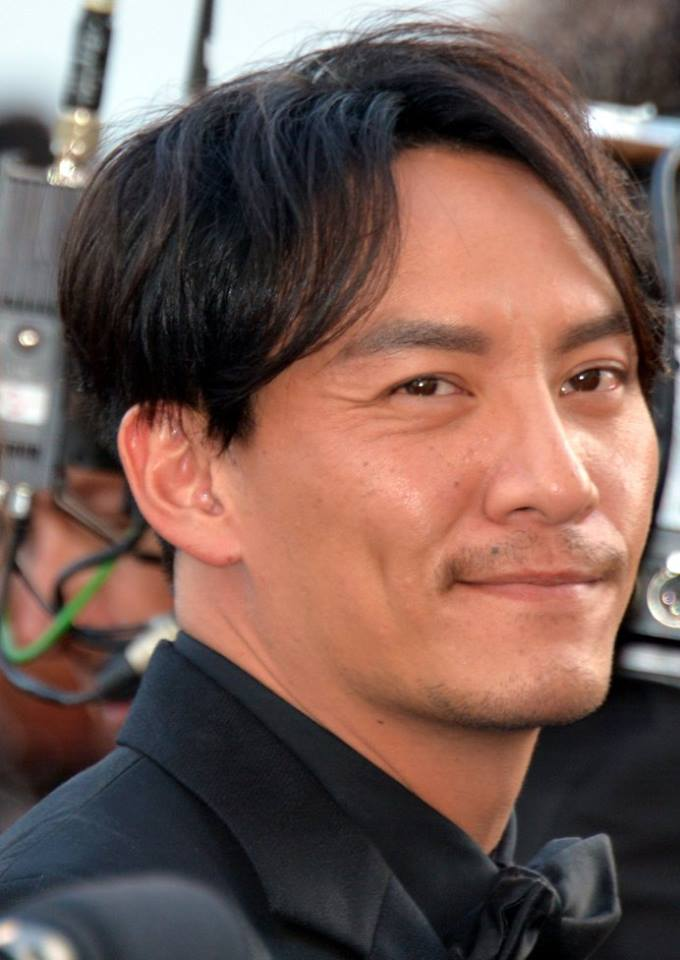
Chang Chen makes his producer debut with the film

18×2 Beyond Youthful Days is adapted from and based on real-life events recorded in a travelogue titled Wandering Journey on Slow Train in Japan (Chinese: 日本慢車流浪記), written by Jimmy Lai under the pseudonym "Blue Fox". Lai, a Taiwanese video game developer, embarked on a vacation journey across Japan using the Seishun 18 Ticket and wrote the travelogue, aiming to reminisce about his romantic past with a Japanese backpacker. After publishing the travelogue on the Taiwanese blog Backpackers and it went viral in 2014, Lai was approached by film production studios interested in purchasing the adaptation rights. Eventually, producer Roger Huang acquired the rights and began searching for film directors and screenwriters to join the project. Actor Chang Chen and director-producer Lin Yu-hsien became attached to the project in the early stages, with Chang making his producer debut at the invitation of his friend Huang, and he described the experience as a "learning opportunity". However, Lai became dissatisfied with the numerous screenplay drafts, feeling that the filmmakers and production companies were excessively expanding the story length and introducing new elements that deviated from the essence of his travelogue. As script after script was rejected and with Lai's subsequent migration to the United States, the project was stuck in development hell for four years. In 2019, during the Kaohsiung Film Festival, Huang met Japanese filmmaker Michihito Fujii, who expressed interest in participating in Taiwanese film productions. Huang invited Fujii to helm the project, and Fujii accepted the role of director and screenwriter shortly after reading the travelogue. After Fujii joined the project, Huang rebranded the film from a domestic production with overseas location shoots into a collaborative film between Taiwan and Japan. Fujii initiated negotiations with Japanese production companies and sponsors, including East Japan Railway Company, which also permitted the crew to film on the railways with loaned train carriages.

=== Pre-production ===
After attaching to the project in 2019, Michihito Fujii spent four years penning the screenplay. He retained several background settings from Jimmy Lai's travelogue, including Lai's occupation as a video game developer and the names of the two main characters, Jimmy and Ami. However, he made numerous amendments, such as changing the story's background from Chiayi to Tainan, the hometown of Fujii's Taiwanese grandfather, as he found an older city more fitting for the film's tone. The time period was adjusted from 1996 to 2006, fitting Fujii's adolescence and allowing for a better grasp of the social atmosphere. Fujii also added backstories for Jimmy, detailing his venture into starting his own video game company, and revealed the reasons why Ami traveled to Taiwan, which further strengthened their character arcs. Brian Lee, a real-life friend of Jimmy Lai and a video game developer for SIGONO, also influenced the portrayal of Jimmy's entrepreneurial failure. Opus: Rocket of Whispers and Opus: Echo of Starsong, two video games developed by Lee, were featured in the film.

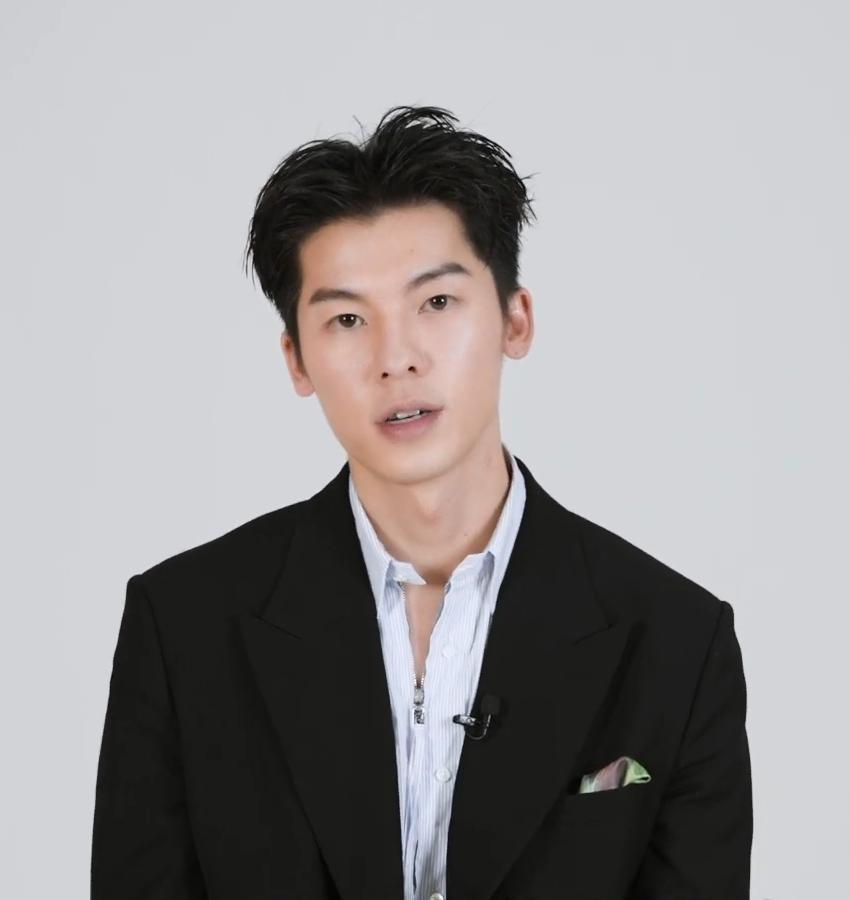
Greg Hsu

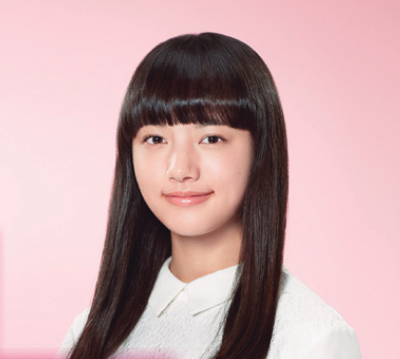
Kaya Kiyohara

The film's production was officially announced under the working title Youth (Chinese: 青春) in March 2023, with Far EasTone as a major sponsor and starring Greg Hsu, Kaya Kiyohara, Hitomi Kuroki, and Chang Chen in lead roles. Chang later dropped out of the acting role to focus on his duties as producer. The casting choices were all proposed by Fujii, and Chang Chen provided advice but did not have a direct role in the casting process. Greg Hsu was recommended to Fujii by his friends due to his ability to portray both the 18-year-old and 36-year-old versions of the character, which Fujii described as having "a sense of both youthful and mature". Hsu accepted the role after reading the script and was drawn to the film's robust production crew. Kaya Kiyohara, who had previously worked with Fujii on his 2019 film Day and Night and 2020 film The Brightest Roof in the Universe, readily accepted the role as she was fond of the story and interested in joining an international project.

Hitomi Kuroki was invited by Chang Chen to make a cameo appearance, following their collaboration as award presenters at the 59th Golden Horse Awards, where Chang revealed to her that he was involved in a project with Michihito Fujii, and Kuroki gladly accepted the offer. The production crew consisted of an equal mix of Taiwanese and Japanese members, and Fujii prioritized the employment of crew members who were around 36 years old to better understand Jimmy's character traits in the film. Hsu was sent to Japan on the film's budget a week prior to filming to learn Japanese.

=== Filming ===
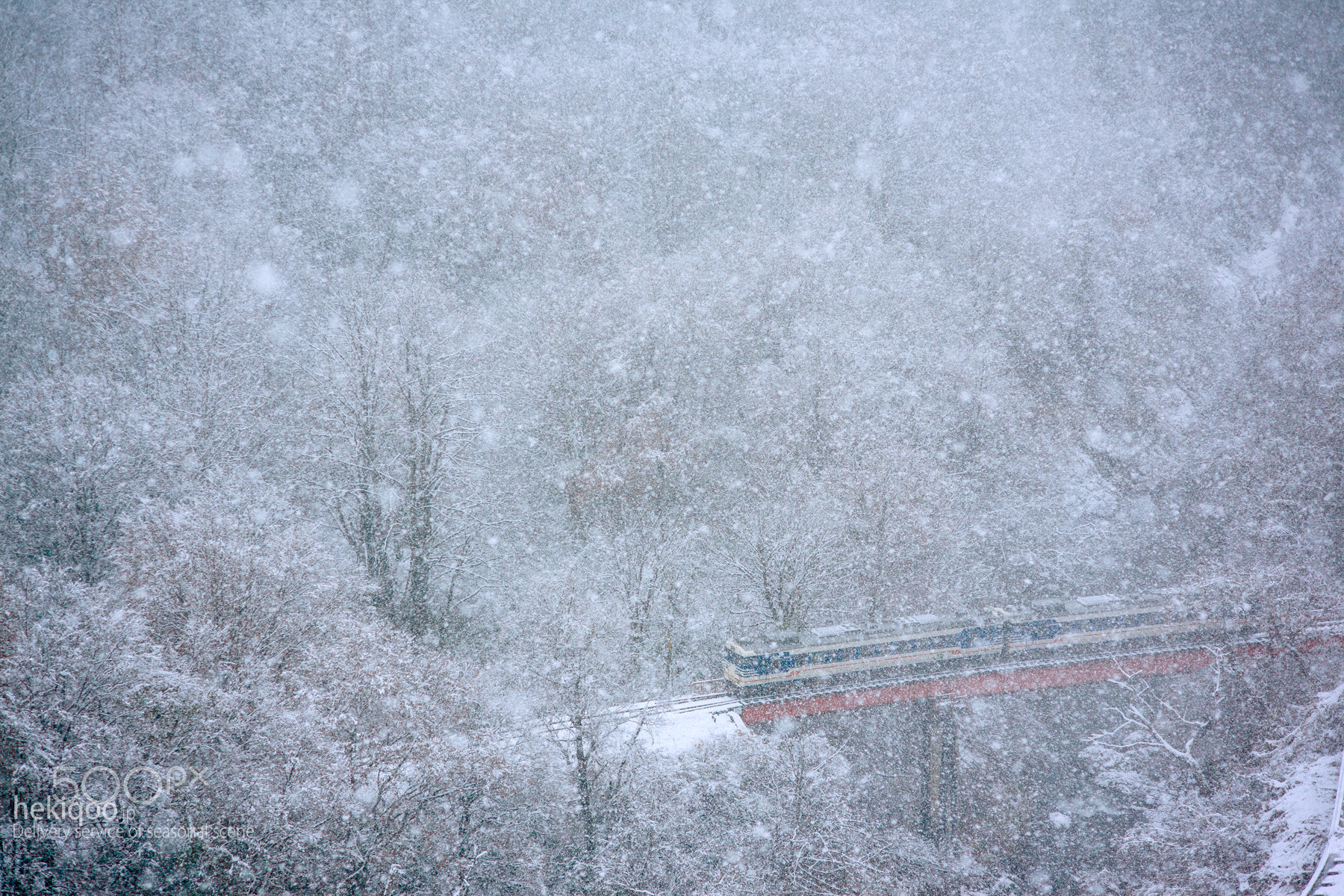
A train scene set in snowfall was filmed on the Tadami Line as a tribute to Love Letter (1995)

Principal photography began in Japan in March 2023. Michihito Fujii chose to film in Japan during March as the country undergoes seasonal change in that month, enabling the crew to capture both snowfall at the beginning of the month and cherry blossoms at the end. Taiwanese cinematographer Chan Chih-teng was initially attached to the project but had to withdraw since his wife was scheduled to give birth in the filming period. Keisuke Imamura, a frequent collaborator of Fujii, stepped in as the substitute cinematographer. Imamura intentionally included a snowfall scene shot in Japan as a tribute to the 1995 romance film Love Letter. He also established a fixed colour temperature and selected lenses with Fujii prior to filming, adapting warm orange tones in Taiwan and cold blue tones in Japan to create a contrast. Filming took place in Tokyo, Kanagawa Prefecture, Nagano Prefecture, Niigata Prefecture, and Fukushima Prefecture, which the latter three are located on the JR Iiyama Line and Tadami Line. East Japan Railway Company provided assistance for the crew in set construction while filming in train carriages. Several scenes were cinematographed at Mori-Miyanohara Station, Nagaoka Station, and Tadami Station, as well as the railway crossing near Kamakurakōkōmae Station, a tourist spot due to its feature in the manga Slam Dunk. On 25 March, scenes of Hsu and Haru Kuroki's characters releasing sky lanterns were shot at ski resort New Greenpia Tsunan in Tsunan, Niigata. Other filming locations included Shibuya Excel Hotel Tokyu and Sumida Park in Tokyo, Matsumoto Castle in Nagano, and Yuigahama in Kanagawa.

After completing the scenes in Japan, the crew moved to Taiwan and commenced filming in April. The majority of the filming was completed in Tainan, with occasional shoots in Yunlin County, Kaohsiung, and New Taipei City. In Tainan, the filming locations included Fort Provintia, Shuei Sian Temple Market, Tiantan Tiangong Temple, Hsinchu East Gate, and Sihcao Boulevard, which were used as the dating spots for Hsu and Kiyohara's characters in the film. Hsu and Kiyohara spent nine hours filming on a motorcycle, shuttling between these locations. Filming then continued at Chuan Mei Theatre, the only Taiwanese theater adorned with hand-painted movie posters, in mid-April. The film also featured Wusheng Night Market, where the crew invited local hawkers to participate in the shoot. Other filming locations in Tainan included Bao'an railway station and Yuguang Island, as well as the campus of Tainan University of Technology, which Hsu's character attended.

The scene featuring Jimmy and Ami releasing sky lanterns was filmed at Shifen railway station

Hsu took a brief hiatus to attend the 59th Baeksang Arts Awards which was held on 28 April in South Korea, before returning to film the scenes depicting Hsu and Kiyohara releasing sky lanterns at Shifen railway station in Pingxi District, New Taipei City, on 29 April. The shooting schedule at Shifen was disrupted by weather conditions, resulting in a delay from nightfall to the following morning. The scenes set at Karaoke Kobe, a recurring location in the film where Hsu and Kiyohara's characters worked, were filmed at a spa center in Huwei, Yunlin. The entire center underwent renovation to recreate a nostalgic ambience. The exterior wall painting of the Karaoke was decorated by Fujii's sister and picture book illustrator Rumi Yoshida. Hsu mentioned that the scenes revolving around the Karaoke were grouped together and filmed intensively, describing those shoots as having "boss-fighting level of difficulty". Filming ultimately concluded in late May.

=== Post-production ===
Post-production spanned across six months, and was carried out separately in Taiwan and Japan. The respective crews in each country handled the scenes shot within their jurisdiction. As the film was set in two separate timelines, Fujii personally drew storyboards for continuity editing to connect the junctions between scene changes. He also made an effort to group scenes from the same timeline together, minimizing the need for transitions. However, he allowed the two crews to employ different styles and pacing during the editing process to better convey the cultural differences between the two countries. The film was announced to be distributed by Happinet Phantom Studios in Japan, and sales were launched at the Asian Film Market on 7 October 2023. The film was officially announced to be released in Japan on 27 October 2023, with a projected theatrical release date of May 2024. Its title was revealed to be 18×2 Beyond Youthful Days on 30 October.

=== Music ===
The film is scored by Japanese composer Takashi Ohmama. The film's theme song, "Traveller of Memories", is performed by the Japanese band Mr. Children. Production of the theme song began during the scriptwriting stage. Michihito Fujii is a long-time fan of the band who started listening to their songs in his teenage years and personally invited them to contribute to the film, which he considers a "milestone in his career". In addition, the film features the Taiwanese band Mayday's song "Peter and Mary", recommended by Fujii's Taiwanese assistant, who likened Mayday to the Taiwanese counterpart of Mr. Children. The film's score was released as a soundtrack album on 1 May 2024, in Japan.

== Marketing ==
The Japanese version teaser of the film was released on 7 October 2023, followed by the Taiwanese version on 30 October, alongside the official promotional poster. Both Taiwanese and Japanese versions of the official trailer were released on 25 January 2024. The Taiwanese version of the official trailer was edited by filmmaker John Hsu, who shared a similar background with the protagonist Jimmy, as they both aspired to become video game developers in their early lives. Jump! Boys, the film's production company, launched a marketing campaign in collaboration with the East Japan Railway Company and Klook in March 2024, which introduced a packaged rail pass that included the filming locations of Jimmy's journey. A special collaboration with video game developer SIGONO also took place, featuring a crossover poster with SIGONO's game Opus: Echo of Starsong released in selected cinemas on 30 and 31 March. An official guidebook was released on 2 May in Japan.

== Release ==
18×2 Beyond Youthful Days had its world premiere at Ambassador Theatres Taipei on 14 February 2024, and was released theatrically in Taiwan on 14 March. A special screening event took place in Tokyo on 27 March, with a theatrical release in Japan on 3 May. In addition, the film was selected to be screened at the 48th Hong Kong International Film Festival, 26th Far East Film Festival, and 23rd New York Asian Film Festival. The film is also available for streaming on Netflix starting 2 August 2024.

== Reception ==
=== Box office ===
18×2 Beyond Youthful Days grossed over NT$7.7 million on its first day of release, directly ascending to the top of the box office in Taiwan. By the end of the first weekend, it had accumulated a total gross of NT$28 million, securing the top position in the weekly box office. In its second week, the film grossed over NT$45 million, making it the highest-grossing 2024 domestic film in Taiwan. The film grossed over NT$50 million by the third week, and surpassed NT$60 million within the fourth week. It reached a cumulative gross of over NT$70 million by the fifth weekend. On its seventh weekend, which also marked its premiere release in Japan, the film's box office stood at NT$73 million. The film also grossed over JPY$176 million in the first weekend after its release in Japan, rising to the seventh spot in the Japanese weekly box office. As of June 2024, the film's worldwide box office gross exceeded NT$500 million, which marks the film as the highest-grossing Taiwanese film of the first half of 2024.

=== Critical response ===
The film received generally positive reviews from critics, with China Times describing it as "a success in both box office and critical acclaim".

Alan Chu of United Daily News wrote that instead of being a "Taiwanese-flavored Japanese film" or "Japanese-flavored Taiwanese film", director Michihito Fujii "carefully balances the aesthetic tones of both regions" while incorporating "pure-love elements" reminiscent of You Are the Apple of My Eye (2011) and At Cafe 6 (2016), remarking that "the film is primarily aimed at commercial success". CommonWealth Magazine's Sumi Chen shared a similar opinion, praising Fujii's "sharpness and critical insight, but balanced with sensitivity and warmth", which helps audiences better understand "the intentions behind certain decisions of the characters, accept some overly emotional scenes, and embrace some room for imagination".

Writing for HK01, Keith Ho focused on the film's aesthetics, commending its "depiction of the four seasons in Taiwan and Japan", particularly the "beautiful scenery along Japan's railway routes", which acts as "a tribute to youth, and a celebration of Japanophiles". Chien Ying-jou described the film as a homage to Shunji Iwai's Love Letter (1995) in her Yahoo! Lifestyle review, noting that it "carefully portrays the characters' most genuine and tentative expressions of affection and emotional gestures" and Greg Hsu "effectively shapes distinct portrayals of various teenage boys".

Conversely, while James Marsh of the South China Morning Post called the film "refreshingly conventional" and praised Kaya Kiyohara's "strong and endearing" performance in his 3.5/5 stars review, he concluded lamentably that the film's "reverently formulaic story without clarifying the inevitable until the final reel" and criticized Hsu for being "incapable of expressing himself effectively". Mark Schilling of The Japan Times also found the film "formulaic", especially the ending, which he wrote that while "the intent may have been to heighten the poignancy, but for most of the film, [he] thought [he] was watching the story of a barely reciprocated teenage crush".

== Awards and nominations ==
Year	Award	Category	Nominee	Result	Ref.
2024	26th Far East Film Festival	Golden Mulberry	—N/a	Nominated	
2024	61st Golden Horse Awards	Best Adapted Screenplay	Michihito Fujii, Hirokawa Hayashida	Nominated	
2024	61st Golden Horse Awards	Best Cinematography	Keisuke Imamura	Nominated	
2024	61st Golden Horse Awards	Best Original Film Score	Takashi Ohmama	Nominated	
2024	61st Golden Horse Awards	Best Original Film Song	"Traveller of Memories"	Nominated	
2024	49th Hochi Film Awards	Best Director	Michihito Fujii	Nominated	
2024	49th Hochi Film Awards	Best Actress	Kaya Kiyohara	Nominated	
2024	49th Hochi Film Awards	Best Supporting Actress	Haru Kuroki	Nominated	
2025	67th Blue Ribbon Awards	Best Director	Michihito Fujii	Nominated	
