= Opus =

Opus (pl.: opera) is a Latin word meaning "(a result of) work". Italian equivalents are opera (singular) and opere (plural).

Opus or OPUS may refer to:

== Arts and entertainment ==
=== Music ===
==== Bands ====
- Opus (Austrian band), an Austrian pop-rock group
- Opus (Yugoslav band), a Yugoslav progressive rock group
- Opus (Latvian band), Latvian music group
- Pur (band), a German pop group originally known as "Opus"

==== Albums ====
- Opus (Opus album), 1987, by Austrian band Opus
- Opus (Schiller album), 2013, by German music project Schiller
- Opus, 2014, by Jane Badler
- Opus (Eric Prydz album), 2016, by the electronic artist Eric Prydz
  - "Opus" (Eric Prydz song), song from the eponymous album
- Opus, a 2007 compilation album by Mr. Sam
- Opus (Marc Anthony album), 2019, by Puerto Rican singer Marc Anthony

==== Other uses in music ====
- Opus number, (abbr. Op.) specifying order of (usually) publication, and hence applied to collections as well as individual compositions
- Opus Records, a Slovak record label

=== Songs ===
- "Opus", by Black Country, New Road from the 2021 album 'For the First Time'

=== Publications ===
- Opus (comic strip), by Berkeley Breathed
  - Opus the Penguin, the title character of the strip, originally from Bloom County
- Opus (manga), by Satoshi Kon
- Opus (University of Newcastle magazine), a student newspaper of the University of Newcastle, Australia
- Opus (classical record magazine), an American magazine

=== Other arts ===
- Opus (film), 2025, starring John Malkovich
- Opus (play), 2006, by Michael Hollinger
- Opus: The Day We Found Earth, a 2015 video game
  - Opus: Rocket of Whispers, a 2017 sequel
  - Opus: Echo of Starsong, a 2021 sequel
- Work of art (L. opus)
- Magnum opus or masterwork

== Computing ==
- Opus (audio format), an audio coding format
- Opus (microkernel), an operating system kernel
- Opus-CBCS, a computer bulletin board system
- Directory Opus, a file manager program
- OPUS (software), digital repository software
- Claude Opus, a version of the Claude (language model)

== Organisations ==
- Opus Group Berhad, a consortium of several different companies operating under the Opus brand name
- Opus Energy, an electricity and gas supplier based in the UK
- Opus College of Business, US

== Transportation ==
- Opus card, a card used for public transit in Quebec, Canada
- Opus, a bus manufactured by Optima Bus Corporation

== Other uses ==
- Opus (mythology), a son of Zeus
- Opus, Greece, a city in ancient Locris, Greece
- Opus (Elis), a town in ancient Elis, Greece
- Opus, London, a skyscraper in South Bank in London
- Opus (architecture), generic term for "construction method", "construction material", "masonry", in use in Ancient Rome
- OPUS (chromatography), a line of chromatography columns manufactured by Repligen Corporation
- OPUS (psychiatry), a Danish early intervention program for people with schizophrenia spectrum disorders
- Opus Film, a Polish film production company

== See also ==
- Mr. Holland's Opus, a 1995 film starring Richard Dreyfuss
- Magnum opus (disambiguation)
- Opera (disambiguation) (plural form of opus)
- Opus Dei (disambiguation)
