= Opus Dei (disambiguation) =

Opus Dei is a personal prelature of the Catholic Church.

Opus Dei may also refer to:

- Opus Dei (album), an album by Laibach
- Opus Dei (book), a 2005 book by John L. Allen Jr.
- Opus Dei, prayers in the Liturgy of the Hours of the Catholic Church
- Bibliography of Opus Dei, a list of publications about Opus Dei

== See also ==
- Opus
- Magnum opus (disambiguation)
