= Fackler =

Fackler is a surname. Notable people with the surname include:

- David Parks Fackler (1841–1924), American actuary
- John P. Fackler Jr. (1934–2023), American inorganic chemist
- Martin Fackler (1933–2015), American military officer, surgeon and wound ballistics expert
- Martin Fackler (journalist) (born 1966), American journalist and author
- Nik Fackler, American filmmaker and musician

== See also ==
- Fackler, Alabama, unincorporated community in Jackson County
