= Isoko Mochizuki =

Japanese newspaper journalist

Isoko Mochizuki (Japanese: 望月 衣塑子, Mochizuki Isoko; born 1975) is a Japanese newspaper journalist for Chunichi Shimbun (Tokyo Shimbun), based in Nagoya.

Mochizuki is the inspiration for the film The Journalist (Japanese: Shimbun Kisha; 2019), directed by Michihito Fujii and loosely based on a book of the same name by Mochizuki. She stars in the documentary film Documentary of the Journalist (2019) by Tatsuya Mori.

Justin McCurry wrote in The Guardian that "Mochizuki specialises in a brand of robust questioning that many regard as the stock in trade of political reporters in Britain. In Japan, though, she is a rarity in a media landscape where avoiding confrontation is often accepted as the price for continued access to important government sources." In March 2019, about 600 people rallied in support of her at a protest in front of the prime minister's office. In 2018, she co-wrote a book with former The New York Times correspondent Martin Fackler about access journalism and media independence in Japan's major newspapers.

== Personal life ==
Mochizuki has worked for the regional newspaper Tokyo Shimbun since 2000. She has two children.

== Publications ==
- Shimbun Kisha (The Journalist). Tokyo: Kadokawa, 2017. ISBN 978-4-04-082191-7. (in Japanese)
- Kenryoku to Shimbun no Daimondai (The Problem of Newspapers and Power). With Martin Fackler. Tokyo: Shueisha, 2018. ISBN 978-4-08-721037-8. (in Japanese)

== See also ==
- Kisha club
