= Masterpiece (disambiguation) =

A masterpiece is a creation that is considered the greatest work of a person's career, or any work of outstanding creativity or skill.

Masterpiece(s) or The Masterpiece may also refer to:

== Music ==
- Masterpiece (quartet), 2013 international champion barbershop quartet
- Masterpiece (band), an Iban rock band from Sibu, Sarawak, Malaysia
- Masterpiece (soul quartet), a single-album soul quartet formed by Norman Whitfield, featuring members of Mammatapee and Undisputed Truth

=== Albums ===
- Masterpiece (The Temptations album) (1973)
- Masterpieces (Bob Dylan album) (1978)
- Masterpiece (The Isley Brothers album) (1985)
- Masterpiece (Just-Ice album) (1990)
- Masterpieces: 1991–2002, a 2005 album by Mustard Plug
- Masterpiece (Nathan album) (2006)
- Masterpiece (Rakim y Ken-Y album) (2006)
- Masterpieces (HammerFall album) (2008)
- The Masterpiece (album), a 2012 album by Bobby Brown
- Masterpiece (Big Thief album) (2016)
- Masterpiece (Thompson Square album) (2018)
- Masterpieces (Little River Band album) (2022)
- Masterpiece (EP), by MiSaMo

=== Songs ===
- "Masterpiece" (The Temptations song) (1973)
- "Masterpiece" (Gazebo song) (1982)
- "Masterpiece" (Atlantic Starr song) (1992)
- "Masterpiece" (Mami Kawada song) (2009)
- "Masterpiece" (Madonna song) (2012)
- "Masterpiece" (Andy Grammer song) (2014)
- "Masterpiece" (Jessie J song) (2014)
- "Masterpiece" (Basshunter song) (2018)
- "Masterpiece" (DaBaby song) (2021)
- "Masterpiece" (Motionless in White song) (2022)

== Film and television ==
- Masterpiece (2015 film), an Indian Kannada-language film
- Masterpiece (2017 film), an Indian Malayalam-language film
- The Masterpiece (film) or The Disaster Artist (2017)
- Masterpiece (TV series), an anthology series on PBS
- The Masterpiece, a 2011 film starring Preeti Jhangiani
- "The Masterpiece", a season 7 episode of SpongeBob SquarePants

== Other uses ==
- Masterpiece (game), a 1970 board game
- Masterpiece (novel), a 2008 novel by Elise Broach, illustrated by Kelly Murphy
- Masterpiece, a Victorian midwifery book falsely attributed to Aristotle
- Masterpiece (Roy Lichtenstein), a Roy Lichtenstein painting
- The Masterpiece (Hong Kong), a skyscraper in Hong Kong
- Masterpieces: The Best Science Fiction of the Century, a 2001 anthology edited by Orson Scott Card
- Chris "The Masterpiece" Masters (born 1983), American professional wrestler

== See also ==
- Magnum opus (disambiguation)
- Masterpiece Cakeshop v. Colorado Civil Rights Commission
