= Shichirigahama Station =

Railway station in Kamakura, Kanagawa Prefecture, Japan

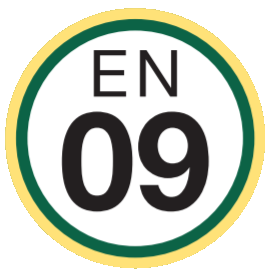
Shichirigahama Station 七里ヶ浜駅

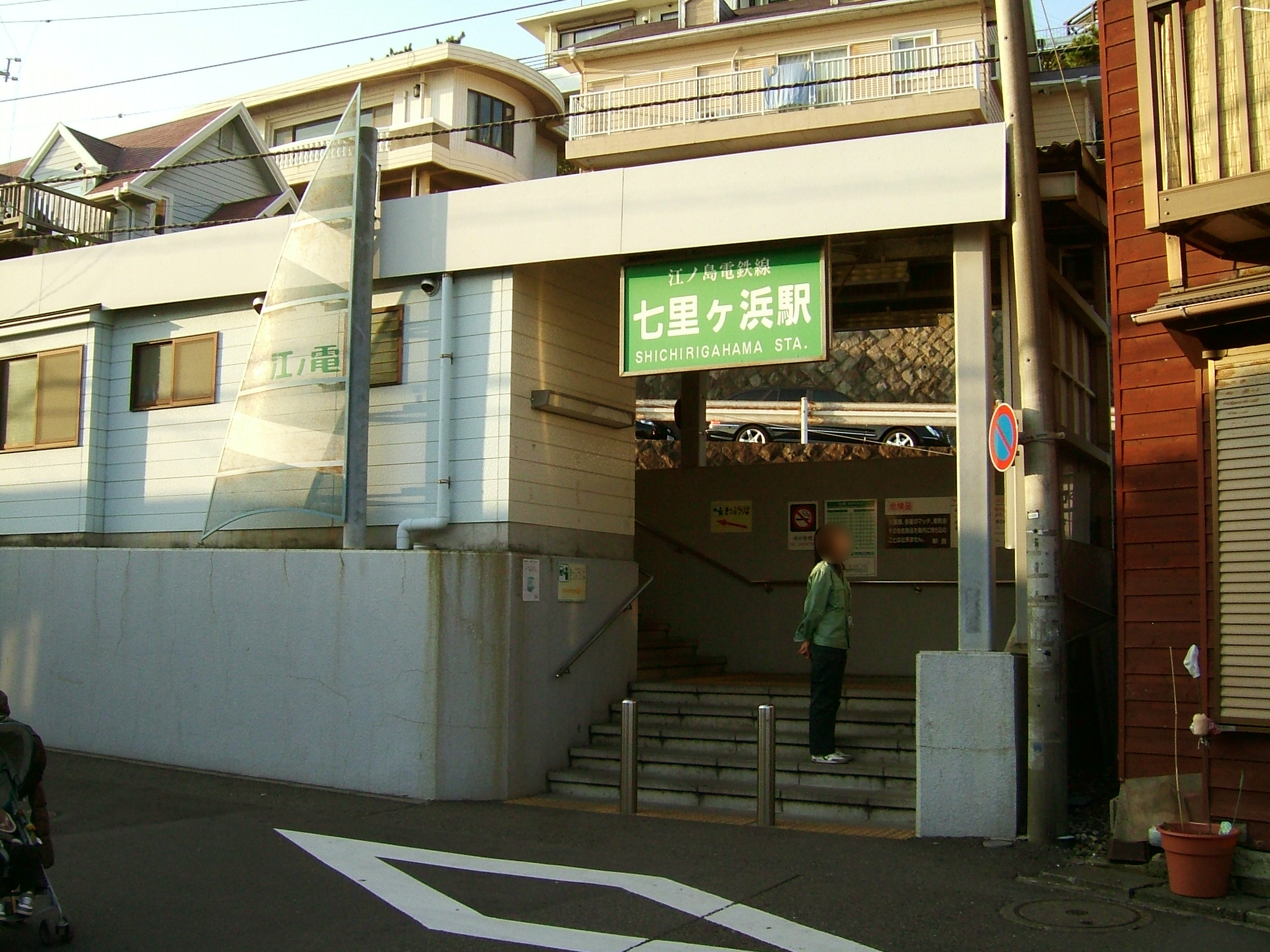
- Shichirigahama Station Exit

General information
- Location: 1-9-5 Shichirigahama-Higashi; Kamakura; Japan
- Coordinates: 35°18′23″N 139°30′36″E
- Owner: Enoshima Electric Railway
- Distance: 5.6 km (3.5 mi) from Fujisawa
- Platforms: 1 side platform
- Tracks: 1

Construction
- Structure type: At-grade
- Accessible: Yes

Other information
- Status: Staffed (09:45–17:20)
- Station code: EN09

History
- Opened: 20 June 1903
- Rebuilt: 1997
- Former names: Tanabe (1903–1915); Yukiai (1915–1951)

Passengers
- FY2019: 7,295 daily

Services
Preceding station	Enoshima Electric Railway	Following station
Kamakurakōkōmae towards Fujisawa	Enoden	Inamuragasaki towards Kamakura
Location
- Location within Kanagawa Prefecture Location within Japan

Shichirigahama Station (Japanese: 七里ヶ浜駅, Hepburn: Shichirigahama-eki) is a railway station on the Enoshima Electric Railway (Enoden) located in the Shichirigahama-Higashi neighborhood of Kamakura, Japan.

== Service ==
Shichirigahama Station is served by the Enoshima Electric Railway Main Line and is located 5.6 kilometers (3.5 mi) from the line's terminus at Fujisawa Station.

The station consists of a single side platform serving one track used for bi-directional traffic. The station is equipped with a restroom and is staffed during daytime hours from 09:45 to 17:20.

== History ==
Shichirigahama Station was opened on 20 June 1903 as Tanabe Station (田辺駅, Tanabe-eki). It was renamed to Yukiai Station (行合駅, Yukiai-eki) on 19 October 1915, and has been called by its present name since 1951. The station building was rebuilt in 1997.

Station numbering was introduced to the Enoshima Electric Railway January 2014 with Shichirigahama being assigned station number EN09.

== Passenger statistics ==
In fiscal 2019, the station was used by an average of 7,295 passengers daily, making it the 5th used of the 15 Enoden stations

The average passenger figures for previous years (boarding passengers only) are as shown below.

Fiscal year	daily average
2005	1,975
2010	1,699
2015	3,310

== Surrounding area ==
- Shichirigahama beach
