= Miyako Shinbun =

Japanese newspaper

- Type: Daily newspaper
- Founded: 1884
- Language: Japanese

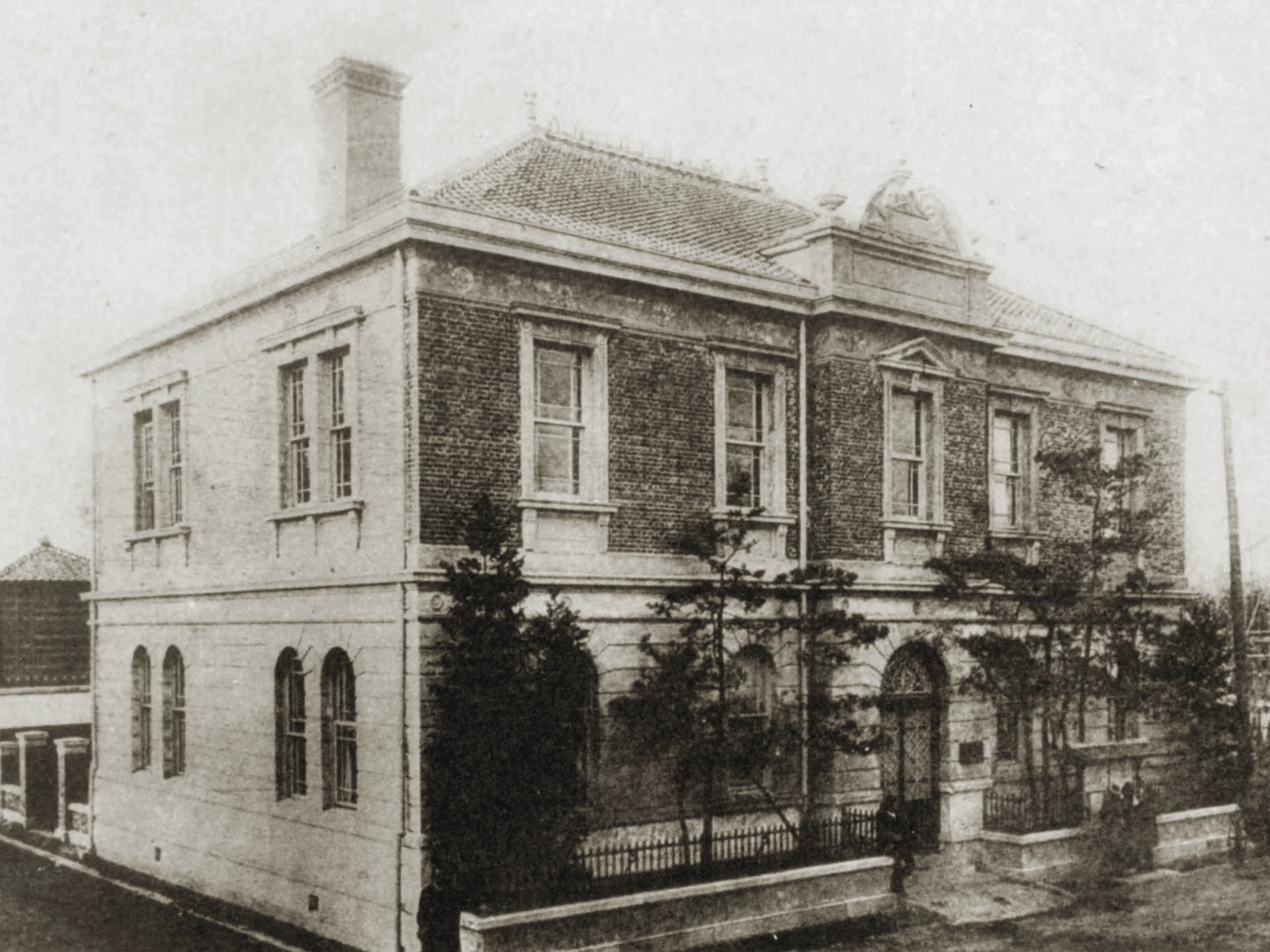
Miyako Shinbun Building

Miyako Shinbun (都新聞) was the first Japanese daily newspaper to be published in an evening edition. It was established in Nagoya.

== History ==
When the newspaper was founded in 1884, its name was Konnichi Shinbun (今日新聞). The name was changed to Miyako Shinbun in 1888.

In the first decade of the 20th century, the circulation of Miyako Shinbun was among the top seven in Japan.

In the 1930s, Mainichi Shimbun was in direct competitor with Miyako Shinbun. The publication was also recognized in the foreign press.

It merged with the Kokumin Shinbun in 1942 to form the Tokyo Shimbun.

== Literary serials ==
The journal published a number of literary serials. In the 1890s, the newspaper had established a reputation for carrying translated or adapted versions of Western novels; but the advent of the First Sino-Japanese War became, in part, a cause for a shift in emphasis to featuring the work of Japanese writers.

One of these was Daibosatsu Toge by Nakazato Kaizan. The work was presented to the public in 41 volumes; and it contains 1533 chapters. This historical novel was the longest in the Japanese language until Tokugawa Ieyasu. 5.7 million Japanese characters.

== See also ==
- Japanese newspapers
- Media of Japan
