= The Journalist (2019 film) =

2019 Japanese short film

- Theatrical release poster
- Kanji: 新聞記者
- Revised Hepburn: Shinbun Kisha
- Directed by: Michihito Fujii
- Screenplay by: Roba Shimori; Akihiko Takaishi; Michihito Fujii
- Story by: Isoko Mochizuki
- Based on: The Journalist by Isoko Mochizuki
- Produced by: Akihiko Takaishi; Mitsunobu Kawamura; Haruo Okamoto
- Starring: Ryoko Yonekura; Tori Matsuzaka
- Cinematography: Keisuke Imamura
- Edited by: Tatsuma Furukawa
- Music by: Taro Iwashiro
- Production companies: The Icon; Star Sands
- Distributed by: ÆON Entertainment
- Release date: 28 June 2019 (Japan)
- Running time: 113 minutes
- Country: Japan
- Language: Japanese

The Journalist (Japanese: 新聞記者, Hepburn: Shinbun Kisha) is a 2019 Japanese drama film loosely based on the 2017 book of the same name by Isoko Mochizuki, directed by Michihito Fujii. It received 6 Japan Academy Prize nominations and won three, including Picture of the Year, Outstanding Performance by an Actor in a Leading Role and Outstanding Performance by an Actress in a Leading Role.

On January 13, 2022, a drama version of The Journalist was released on Netflix.

== Plot ==
Erika Yoshioka, a young journalist, works at Tokyo Metropolitan News where her father committed suicide under suspicion of falsifying news. Yoshioka's boss Mr. Jinya entrusts her with investigating a government plan to establish a new university that has arrived by anonymous fax. Her research leads to Mr. Kanzaki, a Cabinet Official, who soon commits suicide. The investigation next takes her to Takumi Sugihara, an earnest official in the Cabinet Intelligence and Research Office. Plagued with doubts over Kanzaki's death, Sugihara agrees to work with Yoshioka to uncover the scandal that may derail their careers.

== Cast ==
- Shim Eun-kyung as Erika Yoshioka
- Tori Matsuzaka as Takumi Sugihara
- Tsubasa Honda as Natsumi Sugihara
- Amane Okayama as Daisuke Kuramochi
- Tomohiro Kaku as Tamotsu Sekido
- Seiya Osada as Masato Kawai
- Hina Miyano as Chika Kanzaki
- Tsutomu Takahashi as Ryoichi Tsuzuki
- Naomi Nishida as Nobuko Kanzaki
- Kazuya Takahashi as Toshinao Kanzaki
- Yukiya Kitamura as Kazumasa Jinno
- Tetsuji Tanaka as Tomoya Tada
