= Inamuragasaki Station =

Railway station in Kamakura, Kanagawa Prefecture, Japan

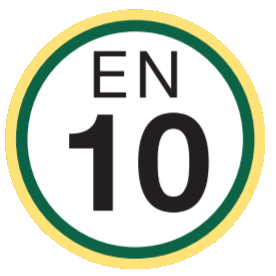
Inamuragasaki Station 稲村ケ崎駅

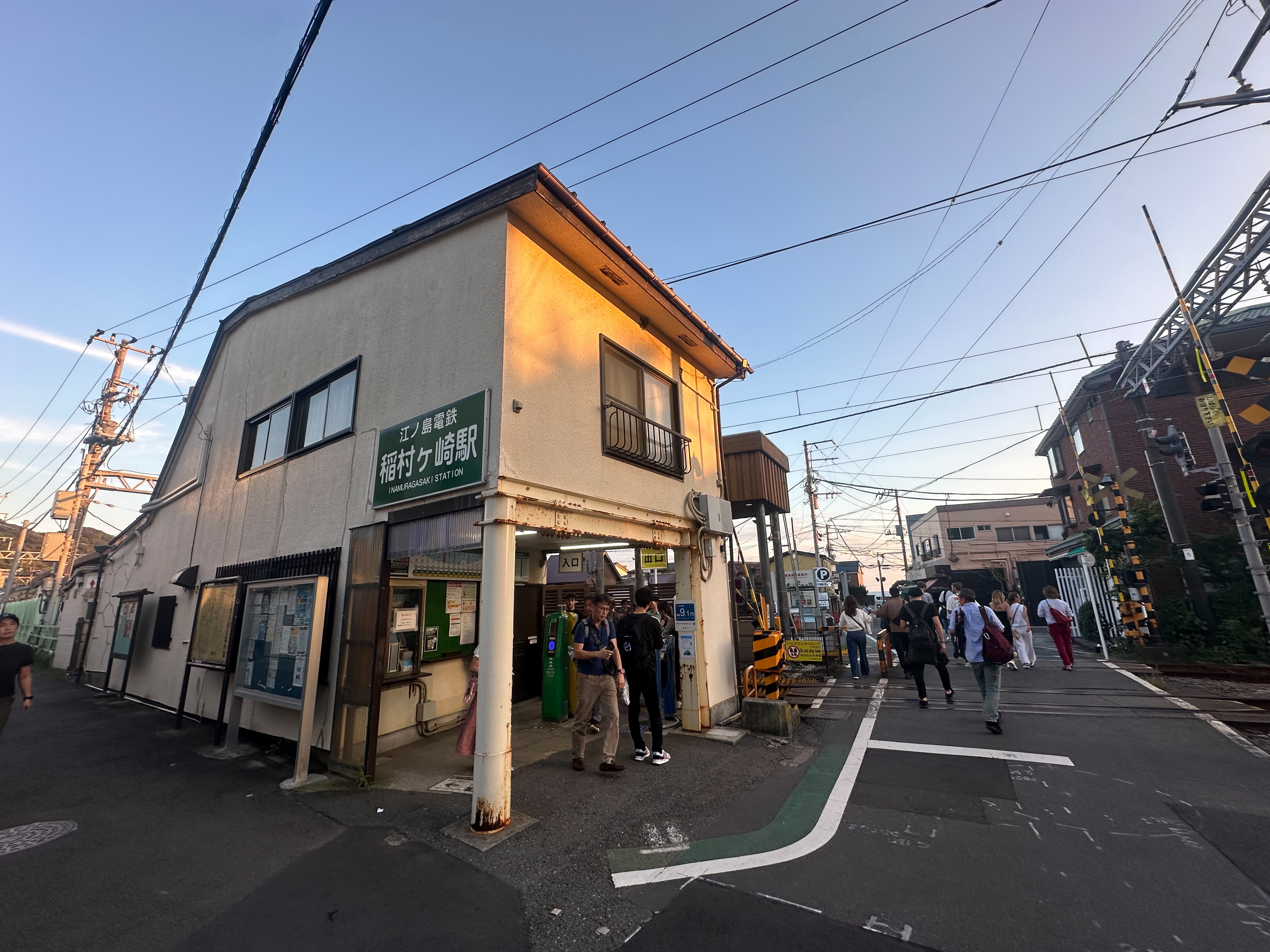
- Inamuragasaki Station Exit, 2024

General information
- Location: 2-8-1 Inamuragasaki; Kamakura; Japan
- Coordinates: 35°18′16″N 139°31′20″E
- Owner: Enoshima Electric Railway
- Distance: 6.8 km (4.2 mi) from Fujisawa
- Platforms: 1 island platform
- Tracks: 2

Construction
- Structure type: At-grade
- Accessible: Yes

Other information
- Status: Unstaffed
- Station code: EN10

History
- Opened: 1 April 1904

Passengers
- FY2019: 4,309 daily

Services
Preceding station	Enoshima Electric Railway	Following station
Shichirigahama towards Fujisawa	Enoden	Gokurakuji towards Kamakura
Location
- Location within Kanagawa Prefecture Location within Japan

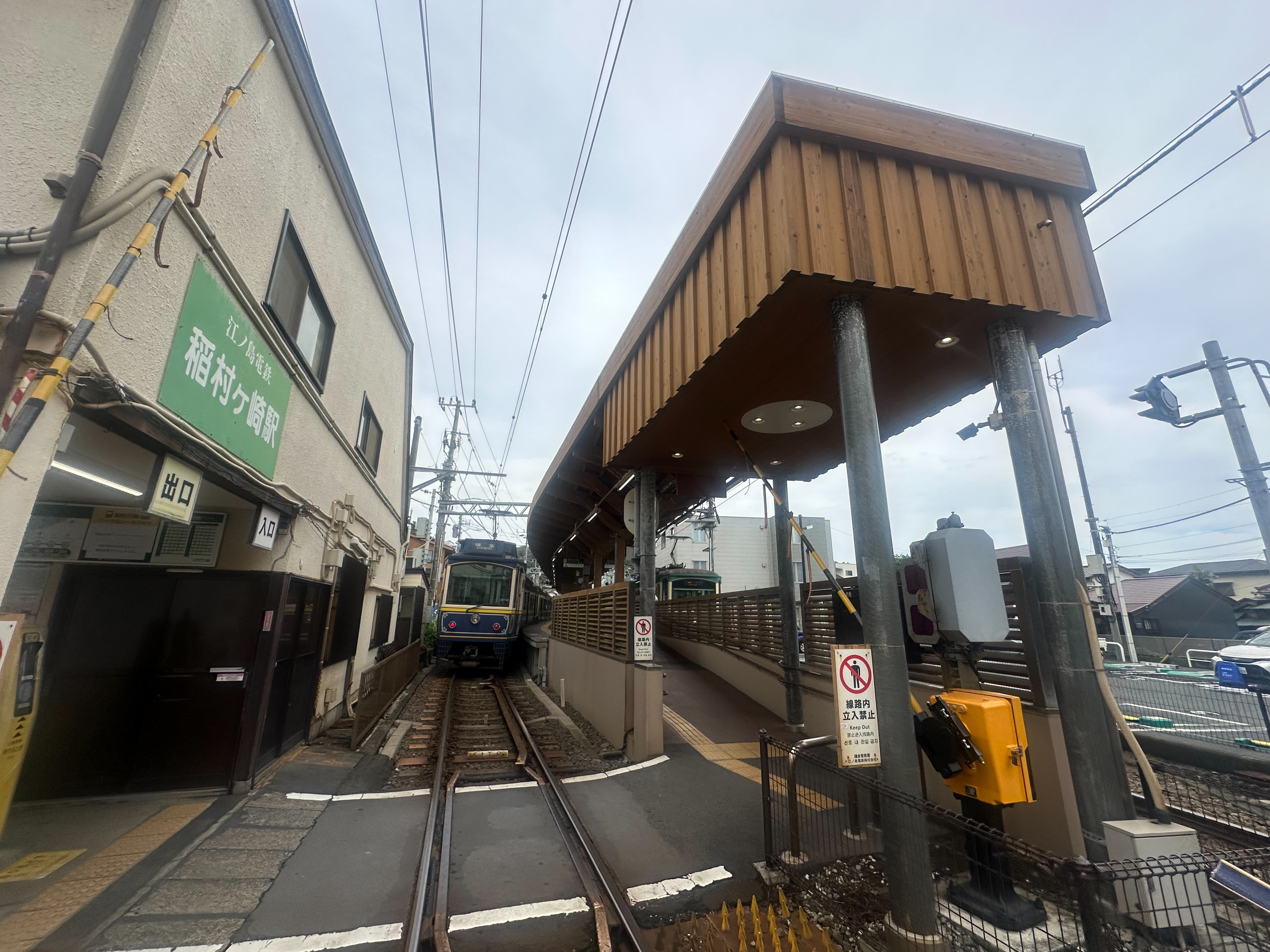
Platforms and trains, 2024

Inamuragasaki Station (Japanese: 稲村ケ崎駅, Hepburn: Inamuragasaki-eki) is a railway station on the Enoshima Electric Railway (Enoden) located in the Inamuragasaki neighborhood of Kamakura, Japan.

== Service ==
Inamuragasaki Station is served by the Enoshima Electric Railway Main Line and is located 6.8 kilometers (4.2 mi) from the line's terminus at Fujisawa Station.

The station consists of a single island platform serving two tracks. The station is equipped with a restroom but is unstaffed.

== History ==
Inamuragasaki Station was opened on 1 April 1904.

Station numbering was introduced to the Enoshima Electric Railway January 2014 with Inamuragasaki being assigned station number EN10.

== Passenger statistics ==
In fiscal 2019, the station was used by an average of 4,309 passengers daily, making it the 7th used of the 15 Enoden stations

The average passenger figures for previous years (boarding passengers only) are as shown below.

Fiscal year	daily average
2005	1,954
2010	1,420
2015	2,494

== Surrounding area ==
- Japan National Route 134
- Cape Inamuragasaki
