= Gokurakuji Station =

Railway station in Kamakura, Kanagawa Prefecture, Japan

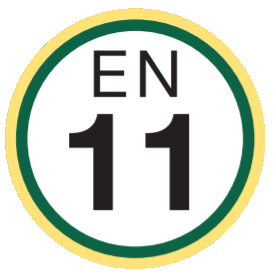
Gokurakuji Station 極楽寺駅

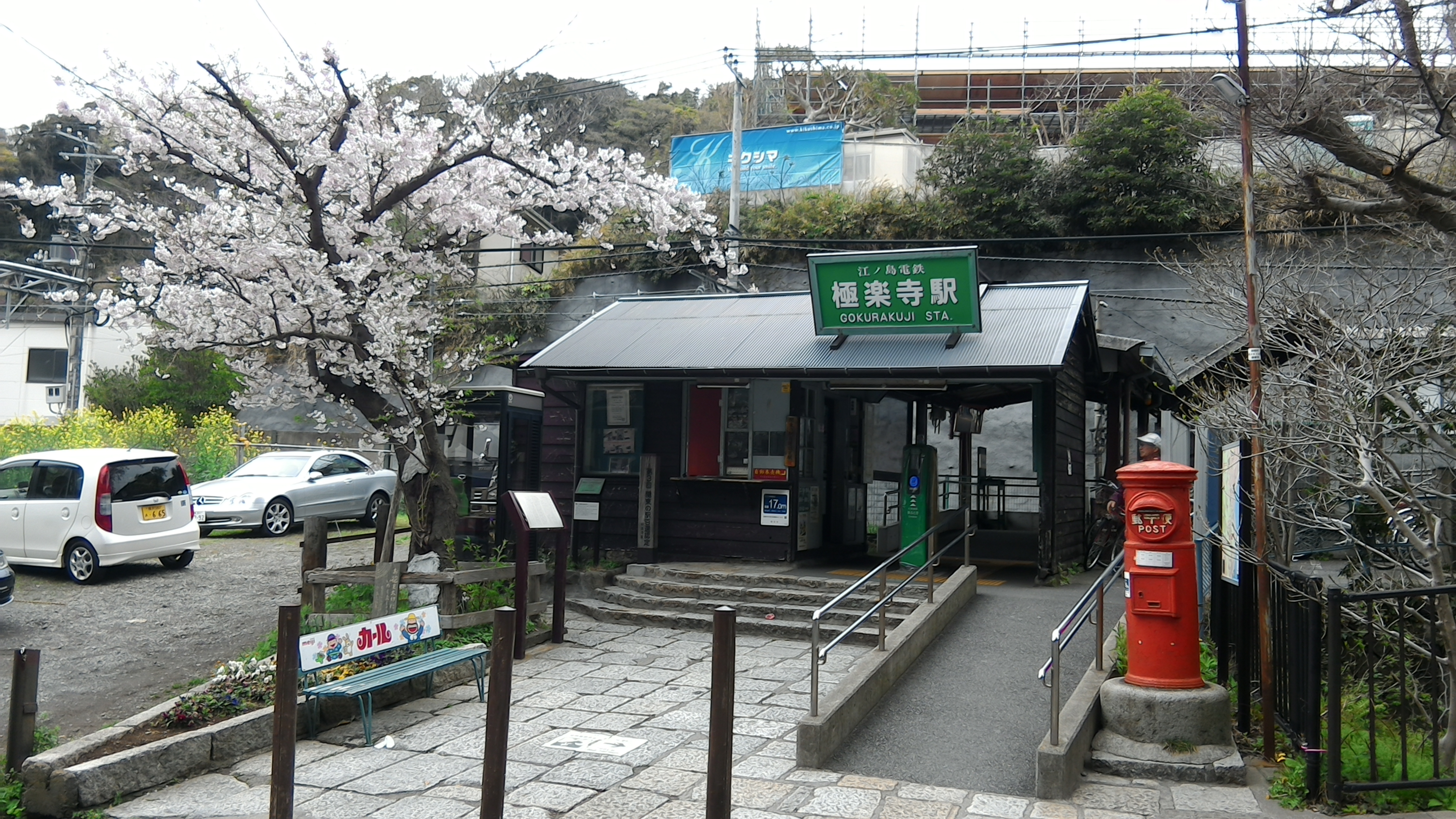
- Gokurakuji Station entrance, April 2017

General information
- Location: 3-7-4 Gokurakuji; Kamakura; Japan
- Coordinates: 35°18′33″N 139°31′43″E
- Owner: Enoshima Electric Railway
- Distance: 7.6 km (4.7 mi) from Fujisawa
- Platforms: 1 side platform
- Tracks: 1

Construction
- Structure type: At-grade
- Accessible: Yes

Other information
- Status: Unstaffed
- Station code: EN11

History
- Opened: 1 April 1904

Passengers
- FY2011: 1,592 daily

Services
Preceding station	Enoshima Electric Railway	Following station
Inamuragasaki towards Fujisawa	Enoden	Hase towards Kamakura
Location

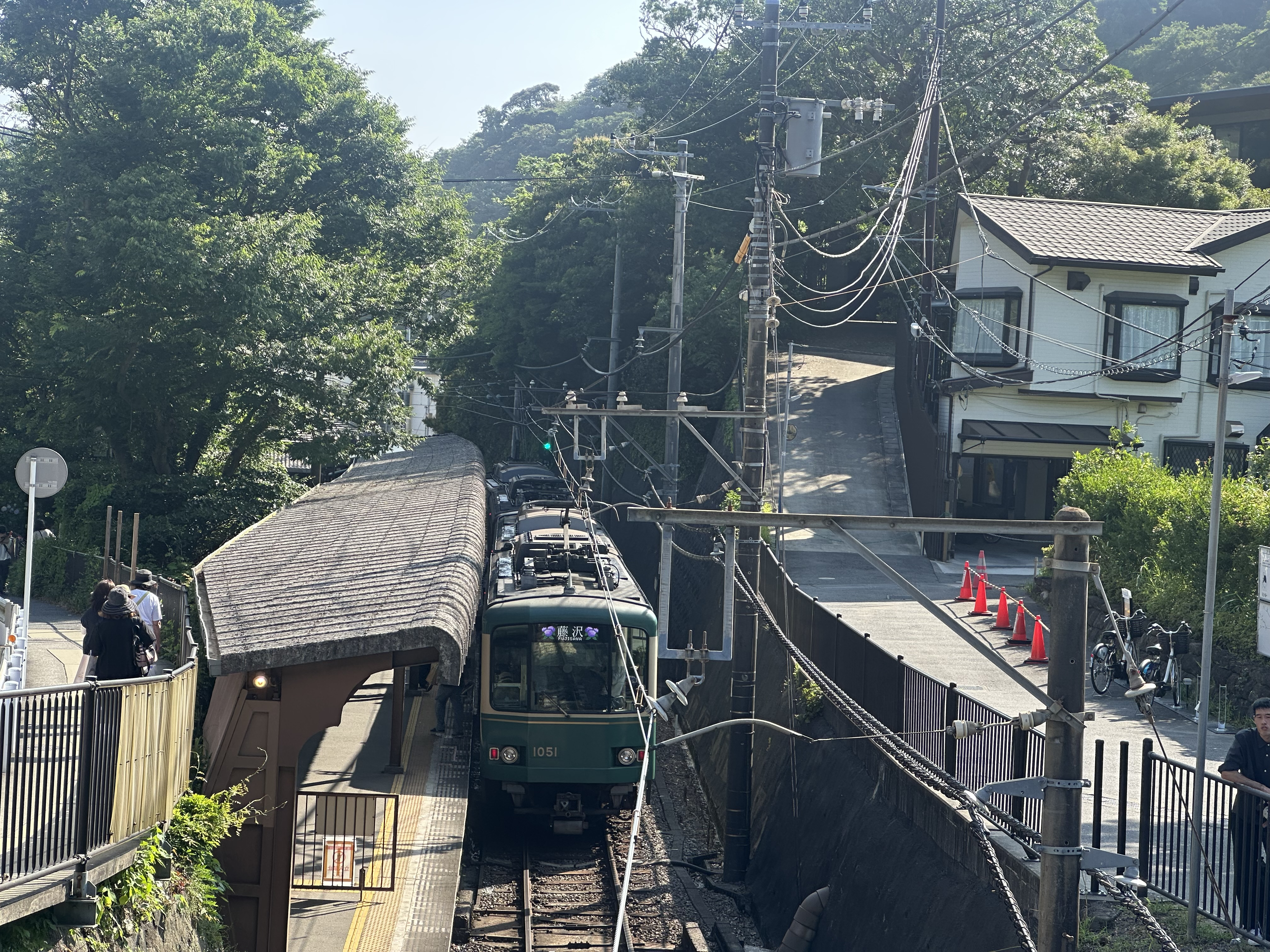
Train at the platform, 2025

Gokurakuji Station (Japanese: 極楽寺駅, Hepburn: Gokurakuji-eki) is a railway station on the Enoshima Electric Railway (Enoden) located in the Gokurakuji neighborhood of Kamakura, Japan.

== Service ==
Gokurakuji Station is served by the Enoshima Electric Railway Main Line and is located 7.6 kilometers (4.7 mi) from the line's terminus at Fujisawa Station.

The station consists of a single side platform serving one track used for bi-directional traffic. The station is equipped with a restroom. Although the station formerly had a staffed office, it is now unstaffed throughout the day.

== History ==
Gokurakuji Station opened on 1 April 1904.

In 1997, it was selected, alongside Kamakurakōkōmae as one of the "100 Top Stations in the Kantō Region" by a committee commissioned by the Japanese Ministry of Transportation.

Station numbering was introduced to the Enoshima Electric Railway January 2014 with Gokurakuji being assigned station number EN11.

== Passenger statistics ==
In fiscal 2019, the station was used by an average of 1,764 passengers daily, making it the 13th used of the 15 Enoden stations

The average passenger figures for previous years (boarding passengers only) are as shown below.

Fiscal year	daily average
2005	583
2010	380
2015	1,173

== Surrounding area ==
- Gokuraku-ji Temple
- Gokurakuji Pass

== Appearance in popular media ==
Gokurakuji Station was featured in the 2004 anime "Elfen Lied", by ARMS Corporation. It was also featured in every episode of a popular Fuji TV television series, "Second to Last Love" (最後から二番目の恋, “Saigo Kara Nibanme no Koi”) directed by Rieko Miyamoto, two seasons of which aired in 2012 and 2014. It is also the setting of the manga "Minami Kamakura High School Girls Cycling Club" which was serialized from 2011 to 2018. The station also appeared in the full version of the music video for the 2011 AKB48 song Kimi no Senaka.

Gokurakuji Station is one of the settings for the 2015 film Our Little Sister.

Netflix series Can This Love Be Translated? which follows the romance between interpreter Joo Ho-jin and actress Cha Mu-hee, was filmed in Gorakuji Station.

== See also ==
- List of railway stations in Japan
