= Tokyo Shimbun =

Japanese newspaper

The Tokyo Shimbun

- Front page of The Tokyo Shimbun on October 12, 2024
- Type: Daily newspaper
- Format: Blanket (54.6 cm × 40.65 cm)
- Owner(s): Chunichi Shimbun Co., Ltd.
- Publisher: Uichirō Ohshima
- Founded: September 25, 1884; 142 years ago
- Political alignment: Centre-left to left-wing Progressivism; Social liberalism Social democracy Environmentalism
- Language: Japanese
- Headquarters: Tokyo
- Country: Japan
- Circulation: Morning edition: 407,777; Evening edition: 133,708 (ABC Japan, average for June 2021)
- Price: Morning edition: ¥100 /copy Evening edition: ¥40/copy Subscription: ¥3,250/month (morning and evening edition)
- Website: www.tokyo-np.co.jp

The Tokyo Shimbun (東京新聞, Tōkyō Shinbun; lit. 'Tokyo Newspaper') is a Japanese newspaper published by The Chunichi Shimbun Company. The group publishes newspapers under the brand name of The Tokyo Shimbun in the Tokyo Metropolitan Area and under The Chunichi Shimbun in the Nagoya Metropolitan Area. The group's combined daily morning circulation is 2.3 million. As of July 2021, according to the Japan Newspaper Publishers and Editors Association, the average daily circulation of The Tokyo Shimbun's morning edition was 407,777 and its evening edition sold 133,708 copies daily.

The Chunichi Shimbun Company's headquarters is in Nagoya, Japan. Its total workforce number is 2,783. The Tokyo Shimbun newspaper is also the owner of the Chunichi Dragons, a professional Japanese baseball team.

== History ==
The group dates back to 1888 when a regional newspaper was founded in Nagoya. In 1942, the newspaper merged with the Miyako Shimbun, which was another Nagoya-based newspaper. The publication took its current form by merging with a Tokyo-based paper in 1967.

== Foreign correspondence network ==
The group has thirteen foreign bureaus. They are in New York City, Washington, D.C., London, Paris, Berlin, Moscow, Cairo, Beijing, Shanghai, Taipei, Seoul, Manila, and Bangkok.

== Notable staff ==
- Isoko Mochizuki
