= Magnum opus (disambiguation) =

A magnum opus or masterpiece is the greatest work of a writer, artist, or composer.

Magnum opus may also refer to:

== Film, TV, games, media ==
- Magnum Opus, a character in the 1998 computer game Quest for Glory V: Dragon Fire
- Magnum Opus, a vehicle in the 2015 video game Mad Max
- Magnum Opus, a 1998 Australian film
- Magnum Opus, an online video series produced by Complex magazine
- "Magnum Opus", a two-part episode in the British TV series Lewis
- "Magnum Opus" (I Am Groot), a 2022 short film from the series I Am Groot
- Magnum Opus Broadcasting, a British company founded in 2004 by Richard Allinson and Steve Levine
- Magnum Opus Press, a game publishing company founded in 2007 by the James Wallis

== Music ==
- "Magnum Opus", a song by Kansas from Leftoverture
- Magnum Opus, a 2014 album by Vaylon, mastered by Leæther Strip
- Magnum Opus (Top Quality album), a 1993 hip-hop album
- Magnum Opus (Yngwie Malmsteen album), a 1995 guitar album
- Magnum Opus Studios, a music studio opened in 1978 by American musician Randy Piper

== Other uses ==
- Great Work, a practice, concept, or ritual in Hermeticism, Thelema, or occultism
- Magnum opus (alchemy), the creation of the philosopher's stone
- Magnum Opus II (1996) and Magnum Opus II (1998), exhibitions by Israeli artist Oreet Ashery
- Magnum Opus: The Building of the Schoenstein Organ at the Conference Center of The Church of Jesus Christ of Latter-day Saints, a 2009 book by John Longhurst
- Megala Erga (Latin: Magna Opera), an ancient didactic poem attributed to Hesiod

== See also ==
- Magnum (disambiguation)
- Magnum Opus Con, a former multigenre convention in the U.S.
- Masterpiece (disambiguation)
- Opus (disambiguation)
- Opus Magnum (album), a 2008 album by Hollenthon
- Opus Magnum (video game), a 2017 video game by Zach Barth
