= David Parks Fackler =

American actuary

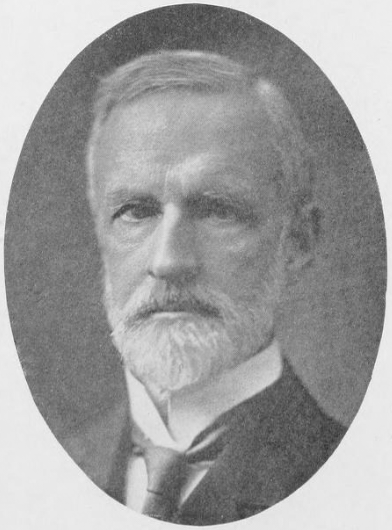
- Born: April 4, 1841; Kempsville, Virginia, US
- Died: October 30, 1924 (aged 83); Richmond, Virginia, US
- Education: City College of New York
- Occupation: Actuary

David Parks Fackler (April 4, 1841 – October 30, 1924) was an American actuary.

== Biography ==
Fackler was born in Kempsville, Virginia, to parents David Morris Fackler and Susan Stith Satchell. He was raised in New York City and attended the City College of New York, graduating in 1859. Fackler worked Mutual Life Insurance Company of New York under Sheppard Homans Sr., resigning to become a consulting actuary. He was a founding member and second president of the Actuarial Society of America. In 1914, Fackler was named an inaugural fellow of the American Statistical Association. He died in Richmond, Virginia on October 30, 1924.
