= Bibliography of Opus Dei =

This is a bibliography of works about Opus Dei, also known as the Prelature of the Holy Cross and Opus Dei, which was founded by Josemaría Escrivá.

== By Opus Dei members and publishers ==
- Alvaro del Portillo: "Faithful and Laity in the Church" The Bases of their legal status. Ecclesia Press Shannon Ireland 1972. Imprimatur: Michael Harty, DD, Episcopus Laonensis 29 April 1972.
- 1982 Statutes of Opus Dei—Latin and English (unauthorized translation)
- Dominique Le Tourneau (2002). What Is Opus Dei?. Gracewing. ISBN 0-85244-136-3.—a French scholar's synthesis
- Amadeo Fuenmayor, Valentin Gomez-Iglesias and Jose Luis Illanes (1996). The Canonical Path of Opus Dei. Four Courts Press. ISBN 1-85182-221-6.—two canonists and a theologian study the juridical nature and history of Opus Dei
- O'Connor, William: Opus Dei: An Open Book. A Reply to the Secret World of Opus Dei by Michael Walsh, Mercier 1991
- William West (1987). Opus Dei. Exploding a Myth. Scepter. ISBN 0-949773-75-1.—a 5-year research in 10 countries conducted by a senior journalist and deputy editor of the Australian
- John Coverdale: Uncommon Faith: The Early Years of Opus Dei (1928-1943), Scepter Publications, 2002. ISBN 1-889334-74-X
- Rafael Gomez Perez (1992). Opus Dei: Una Explicacion. Ediciones Rialp. ISBN 84-321-2892-9.—professor of anthropology explains various aspects of Opus Dei
- Cristianos Corrientes: Textos sobre el Opus Dei. Rialp, Madrid. 1971.
- François Gondrand, At God's Pace, Scepter 1989.
- José Orlandis, Mis recuerdos: primeros tiempos del Opus Dei en Roma Rialp, 1995 ISBN 84-321-3090-7
- Pedro Rodriguez, Fernando Ocariz and José Luis Illanes (1994). Opus Dei in the Church. Four Courts Press. ISBN 1-85182-170-8.—an ecclesiological and theological study of Opus Dei
- Giuseppe Romano (1995). Opus Dei: Who? How? Why?. Alba House. ISBN 0-8189-0739-8.—a study of an Italian essayist
- Luis Ignacio Seco (1987). The Legacy of Msgr. Josemaria Escriva. Sinagtala Publishers, Manila.
- Antonio Viana, “Law and spirit: on the 20th anniversary of the establishment of Opus Dei as a Personal Prelature,” Number 36, January–June 2003, Romana.
- Pedro Casciaro (1998). Dream and Your Dreams will Fall Short. Princeton. ISBN 0-906138-44-2.
- Joaquin Navarro Valls. The Human Realism of Sanctity. Information Office of Opus Dei on the Internet.
- Scott Hahn. "Ordinary Work, Extraordinary Grace: My Journey in Opus Dei" Published by Darton, Longman & Todd Ltd UKEd 30 April 2007.
- Romana Journal.
- See also bibliography section at the end of the Wikipedia entry for Josemaria Escriva, such as for example, Andres Vasques de Prada's "The founder of Opus Dei: The Life of Josemaria Escriva" published in 2001 by New Your based Scepter Publishers.

== By others ==
- John Paul II, Papal Bull Ut Sit Establishing the Personal Prelature of Opus Dei
- John Paul II, Christifideles Omnes, Papal Decree on Escriva's Heroic Virtues
- Cardinal Joseph Ratzinger (Benedict XVI), Opus Dei and St. Josemaria: Letting God work
- Cardinal José Saraiva Martins, St. Josemaria: God's Instrument for Opus Dei
- Richard John Neuhaus, The Work of God in "First Things."
- Allen, John Jr. (2005). Opus Dei: an Objective Look Behind the Myths and Reality of the Most Controversial Force in the Catholic Church, Doubleday Religion. ISBN 0-385-51449-2 — book written after 300 hours of interviews by a journalist of National Catholic Reporter, a left leaning newspaper; link refers to a summary Q&A
- Allen, John Jr. (2005). Opus Dei: An Introduction, Chapter I: A Quick Overview, Chapter 4: Contemplatives in the Middle of the World, Chapter 7: Opus Dei and Secrecy - 4 on-line excerpts from John Allen's Opus Dei
- Allen, John Jr. (24 March 2005). "Decoding Opus Dei". An Interview with John Allen, by Edward Pentin. Newsweek. — a short summary of his book
- Allen, John Jr. (14 December 2005). Opus Dei: The First Objective Look Behind the Myths and Reality of the Most Controversial Force in the Catholic Church. Carnegie Council, New York City. — edited transcript of remarks, part of The Resurgence of Religion in Politics Series
- Allen, John Jr. (January 2006). "Unveiling Opus Dei". An Interview with John Allen, by John Romanowsky. Godspy.
- E.B.E - "Opus Dei as divine revelation" (2016, 576 pages). An historical and theological study by a former member. It includes unpublished historical documents (the Regulations of 1941, several letters of Escrivá to Franco, documents about Escrivá's request for being appointed bishop, etc.). ISBN 978-1523318889 (paperback) and ASIN: B01D5MNGD2 (ebook - Amazon). Online Preview on Amazon website here
- Vittorio Messori (1997). Opus Dei, Leadership and Vision in Today's Catholic Church. Regnery Publishing. ISBN 0-89526-450-1.—an investigation (Un' indagine, the original Italian title) done by a journalist
- Jean-Jacques Thierry (1975). Opus Dei: A Close Up. Scepter. ISBN 0-933932-32-4.—the first serious study on Opus Dei to be published, written by a French journalist
- Fergal Bowers (1989). The Work - An Investigation into Opus Dei in Ireland. Dufour Editions. ISBN 1-85371-037-7.
- Peter Bristow (2001). Opus Dei: Christians in the Midst of the World. Catholic Truth Society, London.
- Massimo Introvigne, Opus Dei and the Anti-cult Movement in Cristianità n. 229 (1994)
- Dan Brown (2003). The Da Vinci Code. Doubleday. ISBN 0-552-14951-9.
- Joan Estruch (1995). Saints and Schemers: Opus Dei and its Paradoxes. Oxford University Press. ISBN 0-7351-0356-9.
- J. J. M. Garvey (1989). Parents Guide to Opus Dei. Sicut Dixit Press. ISBN 0-9628502-0-9.
- Robert Hutchison (1992). Their Kingdom Come: Inside the Secret World of Opus Dei. Macmillan. ISBN 0-312-19344-0.
- Christoph Cardinal Schönborn, "Are there sects in the Catholic Church?" L'Osservatore Romano Weekly Edition in English, 13/20 August 1997, page 3.
- Eric Sammons, Holiness for Everyone - The practical spirituality of St Josemaria Escriva. Published by Sophia Institute Press November 2022.
- Maria del Carmen Tapia (1998). Beyond the Threshold. Continuum International Publishing Group. ISBN 0-8264-1096-0.
- Gordon Urquhart (1999). The Pope's Armada: : Unlocking the Secrets of Mysterious and Powerful New Sects in the Church. Prometheus Book. ISBN 157392699X.
- Walsh, Michael (1989). OPUS DEI: An investigation Into The Secret Society Struggling For Power Within The Catholic Church. New York, New York: HarperSanFrancisco. pp. 230 w/Index. ISBN 0-06-069268-5.
- Silver, Vernon; Smith, Michael. 30 April 2006. "Opus Dei's spiritual quest rooted in work, business". Bloomberg News.
- The Economic Times. (20 May 2006). "We are no ruthless cult, says Opus Dei"
- Deborah Dundas. (19 May 2006). Inside Opus Dei
- Brancoli, Rodolfo (June–July 2002). "Il fantasma dell'Opera: Storia di un'avversione che si sta trasformando in simpatia". Liberal. — "The Phantom of the Opus ('Opera')": story of an aversion that is turning into understanding." An article in a left-of-centre Italian magazine
- Gaspari, Antonio (June–July 1995). "A New Way for the Church?". Inside the Vatican. Provided courtesy of EWTN
- Goodstein, Laurie (7 February 2006). "Group Says of 'Da Vinci Code' Film: It's Just Fiction". New York Times.
- Howse, Christopher (October 2005). Out of the Shadows: Book Review of Allen's Opus Dei: Secrets and Power in the Catholic Church. Tablet.
- Introvigne, Massimo (May 1994). "Opus Dei and the Anti-cult Movement". Cristianità, 229, p. 3-12.
- König, Franz Cardinal (9 November 1975). "Il significato dell Opus Dei". Corriere della Sera.
- Luciani, Albino Cardinal (John Paul I) (25 July 78). "Seeking God through everyday work". Il Gazzettino Venice.
- Martin, James, S.J. (25 February 1995). "Opus Dei in the United States". America.
- Martins, José Saraiva. (9 October 2002). "St. Josemaría: God's instrument for the Work". L'Osservatore Romano.
- Messori, Vittorio (1997). Opus Dei, Leadership and Vision in Today's Catholic Church. Regnery Publishing. ISBN 0-89526-450-1. — an investigation (Un' indagine, the original Italian title) done by the journalist behind Crossing the Threshold of Hope and the Ratzinger Report
- Neuhaus, Richard John (November 1995). "The Work of God". First Things, 57, p. 71-87.
- Ratzinger, Joseph Cardinal (Benedict XVI) (9 October 2002). "St. Josemaria: God is very much at work in our world today". L'Osservatore Romano Weekly Edition in English, p. 3.
- Royal, Robert (May 1998). "Books in Review: Opus Dei". First Things. 83, p. 56-59.
- Thierry, Jean-Jacques (1975). Opus Dei: A Close Up. Scepter. ISBN 0-933932-32-4. — the first serious study on Opus Dei to be published, written by a French journalist
- Van Biema, David (24 April 2006). "The Ways of Opus Dei". Time. Cover Story.

== About Opus Dei in Spain ==
- Arango, E. Ramón. 1995 (1985). Spain. Democracy Regained (Second Edition). Boulder, CO: Westview.
- Carr, Raymond, and Fusi, Juan Pablo. 1991 (1979). Spain: Dictatorship to democracy. London: Routledge.
- De Blaye, Edouard. 1976 (1974). Franco and the Politics of Spain. Middlessex: Penguin. [original title Franco ou la monarchie sans roi, Editions Stock]
- Descola, Jean. O Espagne, Albin Michel, Paris, 1976.
- Ellwood, Sheelagh. 1994. Franco. Harlow, UK: Longman.
- Graham, Robert. 1984. Spain. Change of a Nation. London: Michael Joseph.
- Gunther, Richard. 1980. Public Policy in a No-Party State. Spanish Planning and Budgeting in the Twilight of the Franquist Era. Berkeley, CA: University of California.
- Gunther. Richard. 1980. Public Policy in a No-Party State. Spanish Planning and Budgeting in the Twilight of the Franquist Era. Berkeley: University of California.
- Herr, Richard. 1971. Spain. Englewood Cliffs, NJ: Prentice-Hall.
- Hills, George. 1970. Spain. London: Ernest Benn Ltd.
- Paredes, Javier (coord.), Historia contemporánea de España (siglo XX), Ariel Historia, Barcelona 1998.
- Payne, Stanley G. 1999. Fascism in Spain. 1923-1977. Madison, WI: Wisconsin University.
- Preston, Paul. 1990. The Politics of Revenge. Fascism and the Military in Twentieth-Century Spain. London. Unwin Hyman.
- Preston, Paul. 1993. Franco. A Biography. London: HarperCollins.
- Salgado Araujo, Francisco Franco, Mis conversaciones privadas con Franco, Col. Espejo de España, Ed. Planeta, 1976.
- Tusell, Javier. Manual Historia de España: Siglo XX, Historia 16, Madrid, 1990.
- Various Authors, (Manuel Ferrer, José de Armas, José Lino Feo, Manuel Fernández Areal, Charles Powell, Alfonso Ascanio), Franquismo y transición democrática: Lecciones recientes de Historia reciente de España, Centro de Estudios de Humanidades, Las Palmas de Gran Canaria, 1993.

== In Spanish ==
- Francisco Ponz, Mi encuentro con el fundador del Opus Dei
- Flavio Capucci, Milagros de nuestro tiempo
- Dominique Le Tourneau, Opus Dei
- William West, Opus Dei. Ficción y realidad
- Pedro Casciaro, Soñad y os quedareis cortos
- Manuel Monteiro de Castro, Josemaría Escrivá fue un "extraordinario hijo de la Iglesia" (31-1-2002)- Testimony of the Nuncio of Spain
- "La aventura de ser santo", Miguel Ángel Cárceles
- "El hombre de Villa Tevere", Pilar Urbano
- "El Fundador del Opus Dei", Andrés Vázquez de Prada

== Videos ==
- Opus Dei unveiled. (2006). History Channel. – directed and produced by George Tzimopoulos and Bill Brummel Productions
- Opus Dei: Decoding God's Work. (June 2006). Salt and Light Catholic Television. Co-directed with Marc Boudignon
- Saint of Ordinary Life. – by Alberto Michelini
- A good number of videos with diverse perspectives are available on the opusdei.org website.
