= Martin Fackler (journalist) =

American journalist and author

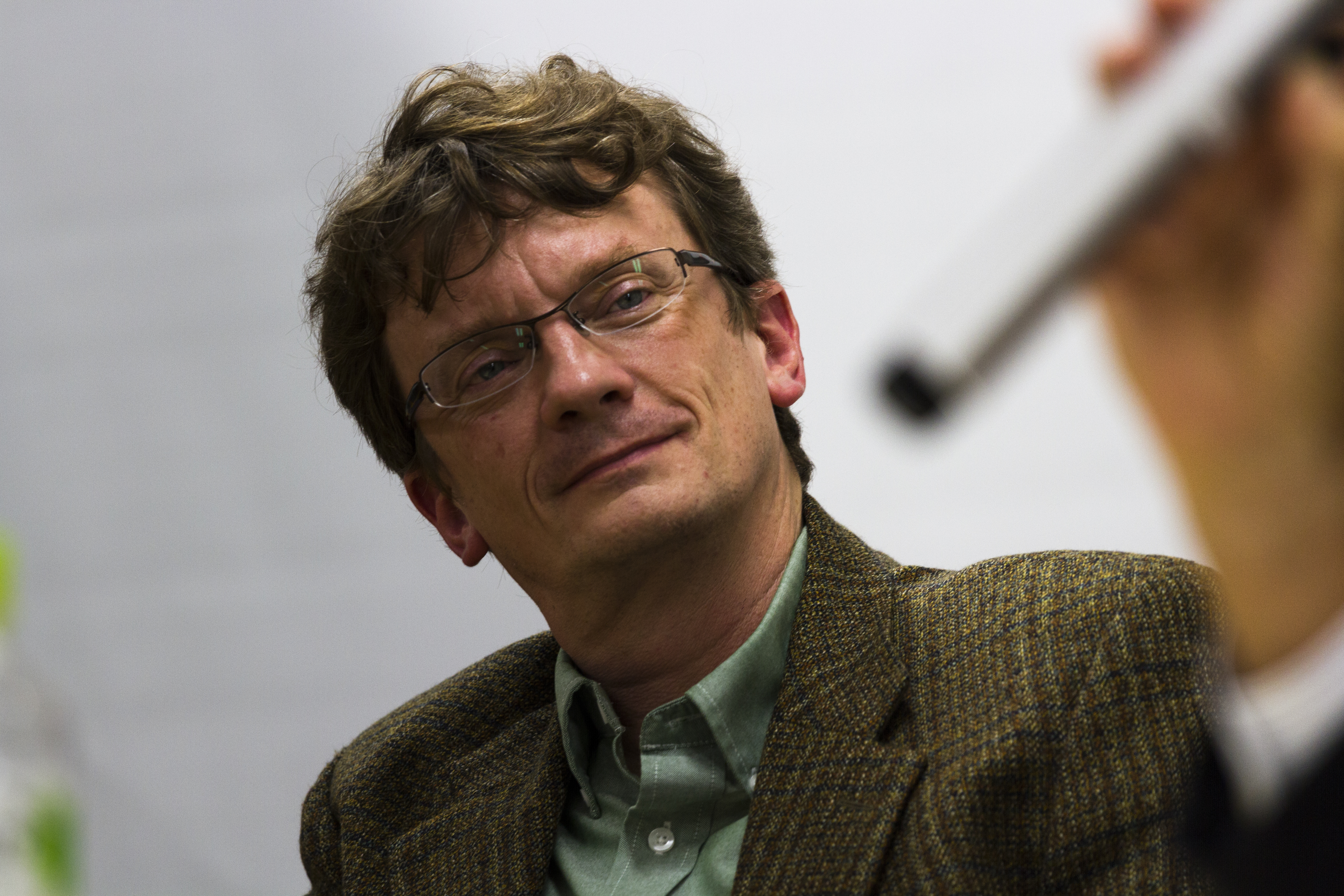
- Fackler at a book talk in Tokyo, 2015
- Born: Martin Fackler; November 16, 1966 (age 59); U.S.
- Education: University of Illinois at Urbana-Champaign
- Occupations: journalist, author
- Notable credit(s): The New York Times; Reinventing Japan: New Directions in Global Leadership (book); Credibility Lost: The Crisis in Japanese Newspaper Journalism After Fukushima (book in Japanese)
- Website: http://martinfackler.com

Martin Fackler (born November 16, 1966) is an American journalist and author. He has worked for more than two decades as a foreign correspondent in Japan and China, including six years as Tokyo bureau chief for The New York Times. In 2012, his team was named as finalist for the Pulitzer Prize in International Reporting for its investigative coverage of the March 2011 Fukushima Daiichi nuclear disaster. He has written or co-written eleven books in Japanese, including the best-seller Credibility Lost: The Crisis in Japanese Newspaper Journalism After Fukushima (Futabasha, 2012).

== Biography ==
After graduating from the University of Illinois at Urbana-Champaign in 1994, Fackler started his career as a journalist at Bloomberg News in 1996, working in Tokyo where he covered financial markets. The following year, he reported on a racketeering scandal involving corporate extortionists in Japan known as Sōkaiya who took millions of dollars from major brokerages and Dai-Ichi Kangyo Bank. Fackler's articles included a profile of the racketeer at the center of the scandal, Ryuichi Koike.

Fackler worked for five years at the Associated Press in Tokyo, Beijing, Shanghai and New York City. In April 2001, he covered the Hainan Island incident, when a U.S. Navy plane landed on the Chinese island of Hainan after colliding with a People's Liberation Army Navy jet fighter. Fackler returned to Tokyo in 2003 to work at The Wall Street Journal, where he covered the Japanese financial crisis caused by bad loans at banks and the so-called Takenaka Plan of the financial services minister, Heizō Takenaka, to end the crisis.

Fackler worked in the Tokyo bureau of the New York Times starting as a freelancer in 2005 and working his way to business correspondent in 2007. Two years later in 2009, he was named Tokyo bureau chief, succeeding Norimitsu Onishi, a post he held until 2015. During that time, he also wrote about South Korea, North Korea and China. He led a team that was named as finalist for the 2012 Pulitzer Prize in International Reporting for its articles into the Fukushima nuclear accident and the Japanese government's refusal to disclose data on the spread of radiation to evacuees. The prize committee called their articles a "powerful exploration of serious mistakes concealed by authorities in Japan after a tsunami and earthquake devastated the nation, and caused a nuclear disaster." In November 2011, Fackler was the first foreign reporter to enter the Fukushima Daiichi nuclear plant after the disaster.

Fackler has also written for magazines such as Foreign Policy and the Columbia Journalism Review about Japanese media issues, including a failed effort at investigative reporting at the daily Asahi Shimbun. He has also published academic papers about journalism in Japan, including the national newspapers' and NHK’s close adherence to the government's official narrative during the Fukushima disaster even when the journalists themselves clearly had doubts, a phenomenon that he calls "media capture."

Fackler has also contributed to Japanese journalism by teaching journalism at the University of Tokyo. In 2015-17, he served as an adjunct researcher at Waseda University's Institute for Journalism, supporting the establishment of the Waseda Chronicle, a non-profit investigative reporting initiative (later renamed Tokyo Investigative Newsroom Tansa). He told a symposium in Tokyo co-hosted by the Committee to Protect Journalists: “There are some very admirable qualities of Japanese journalism. One is tenacity, the other is thoroughness. Journalists read all the documents; they cover all the basics.”

Fackler is fluent in Japanese and has written or co-written eleven books in that language, including The Dogs that Didn't Bark: Media Control in Abe's Japan (Futabasha, 2020) and Credibility Lost: The Crisis in Japanese Newspaper Journalism After Fukushima, a critical look at Japanese media coverage of the nuclear disaster. In English, he co-edited Reinventing Japan: New Directions in Global Leadership (Praeger, 2018). Fackler appeared as himself in the Japanese film The Journalist (Japanese: Shimbun Kisha; 2019), directed by Michihito Fujii and based on a book by Japanese reporter Isoko Mochizuki. He also appeared in the documentary Youkai no Mago (2023), directed by Yuto Uchiyama about the press policies of former Prime Minister Shinzo Abe's administration.

He worked as a Journalist in Residence at the Rebuild Japan Initiative Foundation (later renamed the Asia Pacific Initiative), a think tank in Tokyo, from 2015 to 2017. He has also served on the Media Advisory Board of The Japan Times. He is currently Assistant Asia Editor for the New York Times.
