= Opus: The Day We Found Earth =

2015 video game

- Developer: SIGONO
- Publisher: SIGONO
- Platforms: Android; iOS; Windows; OS X; Nintendo Switch
- Release: Android, iOS; October 22, 2015; Windows, OS X; April 22, 2016; Nintendo Switch; November 30, 2017
- Genre: Adventure
- Mode: Single-player

Opus: The Day We Found Earth (Note: Chinese: OPUS：地球計畫; pinyin: OPUS: dì qiú jì huà; lit. 'OPUS: Earth Project') (stylized as OPUS: The Day We Found Earth) is an adventure game focused on story and exploration, developed by Taiwanese independent studio SIGONO (originally known as Team Signal). It was first released on iOS and Android on October 22, 2015, and received ports for Windows and OS X (available via Steam) on April 22, 2016, and for Nintendo Switch on November 30, 2017. The game was nominated for Best Meaningful Play at the 12th International Mobile Gaming Awards on February 16, 2016.

It was followed by sequels Opus: Rocket of Whispers in 2017, and Opus: Echo of Starsong in 2021.

== Gameplay ==
Opus: The Day We Found Earth is an exploration adventure game where the players have to use a space telescope to search through the cosmos, looking for Earth. By locating and scanning nearby stars, players make progress and unlock areas of the spaceship. As a new area is unlocked, they can examine items and facilities inside to explore the stories and secrets of each character.

=== Space Exploration ===
In telescope mode, the players first choose a mission, which provides some hints for locating a potential Earth. They can then move the telescope around to scan for nearby stars. When the target is located and scanned, players will get an analysis report of that planet, including radius, mass, temperature, water coverage, and Earth similarity. Once discovered, players can give the planet a name of their choice.

=== Spaceship Exploration ===
Every time the players finish a mission, the story progresses as they return to the spaceship, unlocking new missions and areas for exploration. When the players click on an interactable item or facility, dialog will show up and sometimes clues can be found for unlocking special missions, where the target can be stars, asteroids, and even supernovae.

== Plot ==
The story of Opus: The Day We Found Earth begins tens of millions of years from now, when humans have long left their planet of origin to live among the stars. By then, Earth has become a mythical planet and the belief in its existence has become a religion called "Earthology". On the other hand, the human gene pool has deteriorated after millennia of genetic engineering, and the only way to revert this damage is to trace back to the oldest sample of genes left on their long forgotten home planet. Project Earth was then founded and a spaceship named OPUS was launched in order to search for Earth and save the failing human race. The story follows a childlike robot Emeth, who was built by doctor Lisa, a crew member of OPUS, to support the mission, but soon he was forced to shut down for reasons unknown. After rebooting from his extended hibernation, Emeth finds himself alone on the ship, until the artificial intelligence hologram of doctor Lisa was activated. Emeth decided to carry on his mission with the help of hologram Lisa to keep his promise of finding Earth. As the story progresses, it is implied that Lisa and Mikoto had to leave the ship due to illness. Lisa uploaded a copy of her consciousness into a hologram as did Mikoto (the latter of which is DLC exclusive) upon leaving. The star they orbit around, LISA, begins expanding at the end of the story, and threatens to melt the ship. In one final observation, Earth is found behind LISA, and they escape to Earth in OPUS.

== Music ==
The original soundtrack of Opus: The Day We Found Earth was first released on October 21, 2015 on Bandcamp. It was later released on Steam as a downloadable content for the game. All music in the game are included with an addition of four bonus tracks. All tracks are written, produced and recorded by Taiwanese musician Triodust.

== Reception ==
Reception

Aggregate score
| Aggregator | Score |
|---|---|
| Metacritic | NS: 74/100 |

Opus: The Day We Found Earth has received multiple recognitions including a Google Play Editors' Choice, nomination for Best Meaningful Play at the International Mobile Gaming Awards of 2016, Best Mobile Game, nomination for Excellence in Audio at Indieplay 2016, Excellence in Storytelling at the IMGA SEA 2017, Best Narration at the TpGS Indie Game Awards of 2017.

== Sequel ==
The sequel of this game, Opus: Rocket of Whispers, was released on September 14, 2017.
