= Kamakurakōkōmae Station =

Railway station in Kamakura, Kanagawa Prefecture, Japan

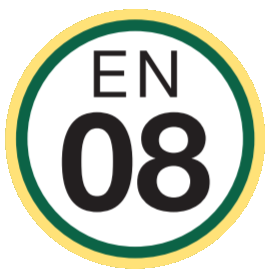
Kamakurakōkōmae Station 鎌倉高校前駅

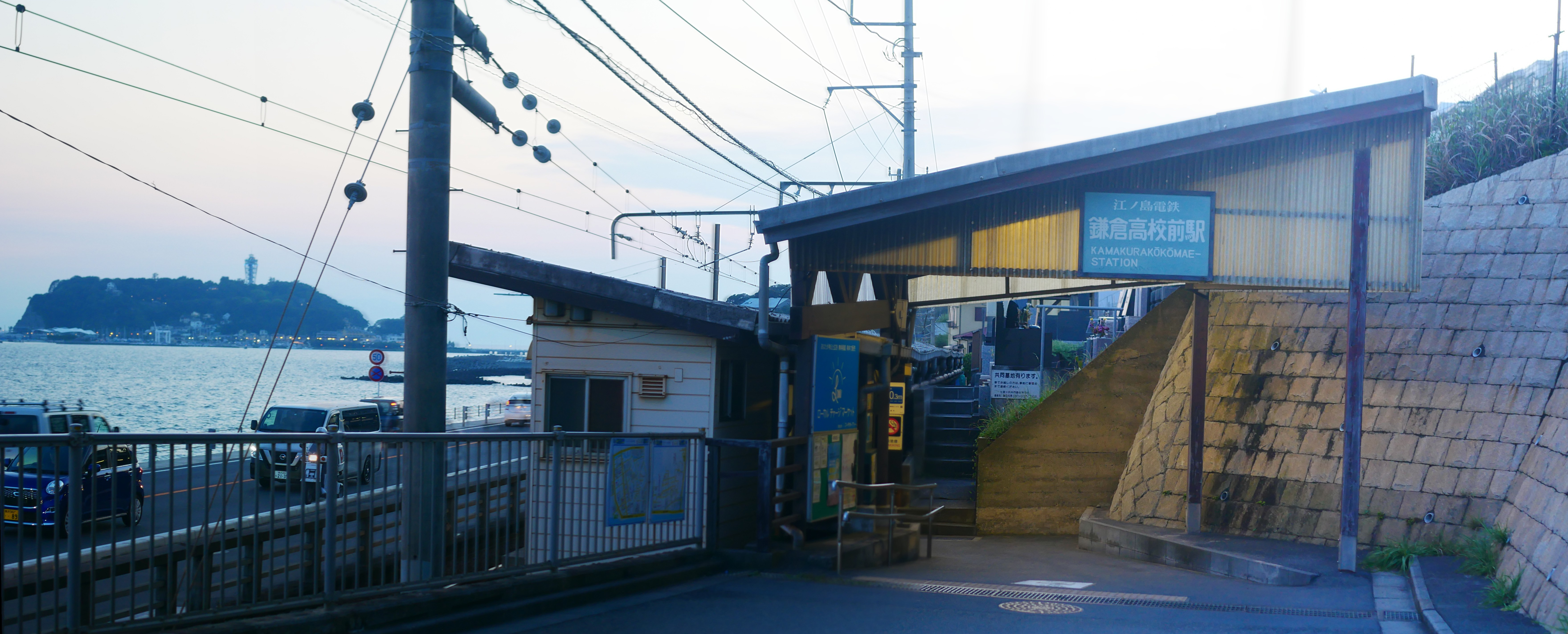
- Kamakurakōkōmae Station, 2020

General information
- Location: 1-1-25 Koshigoe; Kamakura; Japan
- Coordinates: 35°18′24″N 139°30′02″E
- Owner: Enoshima Electric Railway
- Distance: 4.7 km (2.9 mi) from Fujisawa
- Platforms: 1 side platform
- Tracks: 1

Construction
- Structure type: At-grade
- Accessible: Yes

Other information
- Status: Unstaffed
- Station code: EN08

History
- Opened: 20 June 1903; 123 years ago
- Former names: Nissaka (until 1953)

Passengers
- FY2019: 4,378 daily

Services
Preceding station	Enoshima Electric Railway	Following station
Koshigoe towards Fujisawa	Enoden	Shichirigahama towards Kamakura
Location
- Location within Kanagawa Prefecture Location within Kanto Area Location within Japan

Kamakurakōkōmae Station (Japanese: 鎌倉高校前駅, Hepburn: Kamakurakōkōmae-eki; lit. 'Kamakura High School Station') is a railway station on the Enoshima Electric Railway (Enoden), located in the Koshigoe neighborhood of Kamakura, Kanagawa, Japan. Though small in size, it is known for its scenery, as it commands an open view of the Pacific Ocean and Mount Fuji from the station platform.

== Service ==
Kamakurakōkōmae Station is served by the Enoshima Electric Railway Main Line and is 4.7 kilometers (2.9 mi) from the terminus of the line at Fujisawa Station.

The station consists of a single side platform serving bi-directional traffic. The station is unstaffed. Restrooms at the station are available from 10 AM to 6 PM.

== History ==
Kamakurakōkōmae Station was opened on 20 June 1903 as Nissaka Station (日坂駅, Nissaka-eki). It was renamed to its present name on 20 August 1953. In 1997, it was selected, alongside Gokurakuji as one of the "100 Top Stations in the Kantō Region" by a committee commissioned by the Japanese Ministry of Transportation.

Station numbering was introduced to the Enoshima Electric Railway January 2014 with Kamakurakōkōmae being assigned station number EN08.

== Cultural impact ==
The surroundings of Kamakurakōkōmae Station have been featured in numerous Japanese anime, TV shows, movies and advertisements. In particular, the railway crossing on the east side of the station is prominently featured in the theme song of Slam Dunk, Rascal Does Not Dream of Bunny Girl Senpai and a scene in Tari Tari anime, which attracted a lot of Taiwanese tourists to visit.

== Passenger statistics ==
In fiscal 2019, the station was used by an average of 4,378 passengers daily, making it the 6th used of the 15 Enoden stations.

The average passenger figures for previous years (boarding passengers only) are as shown below.

Fiscal year	Daily average
2005	1,117
2010	1,104
2015	3,825

== Surrounding area ==
- Shichirigahama
- Kanagawa Prefectural Kamakura High School
- Japan National Route 134
- St. Theresia Hospital

== Gallery ==
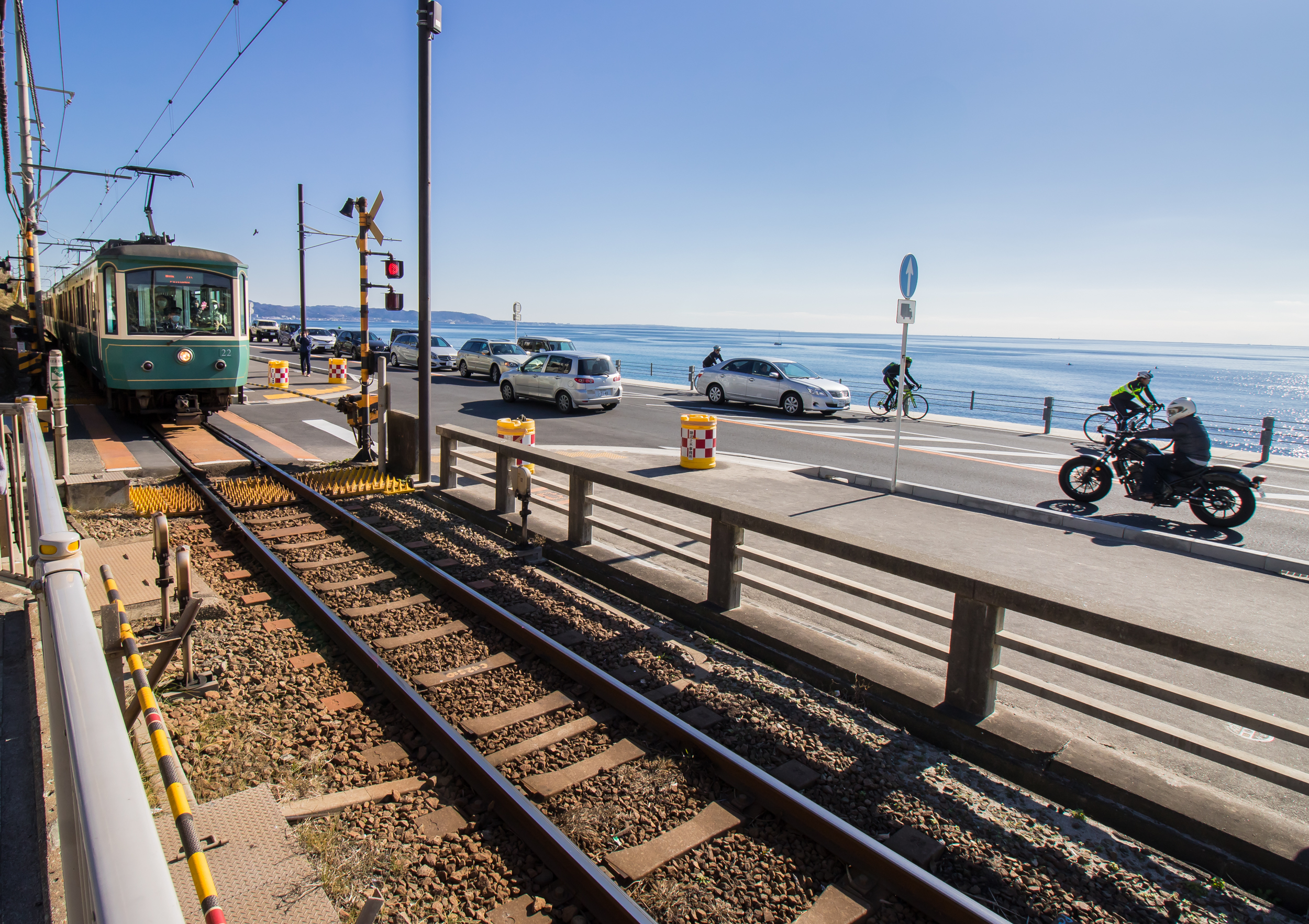
Railway crossing with Route 134 and Sagami Bay on the right, January 2019

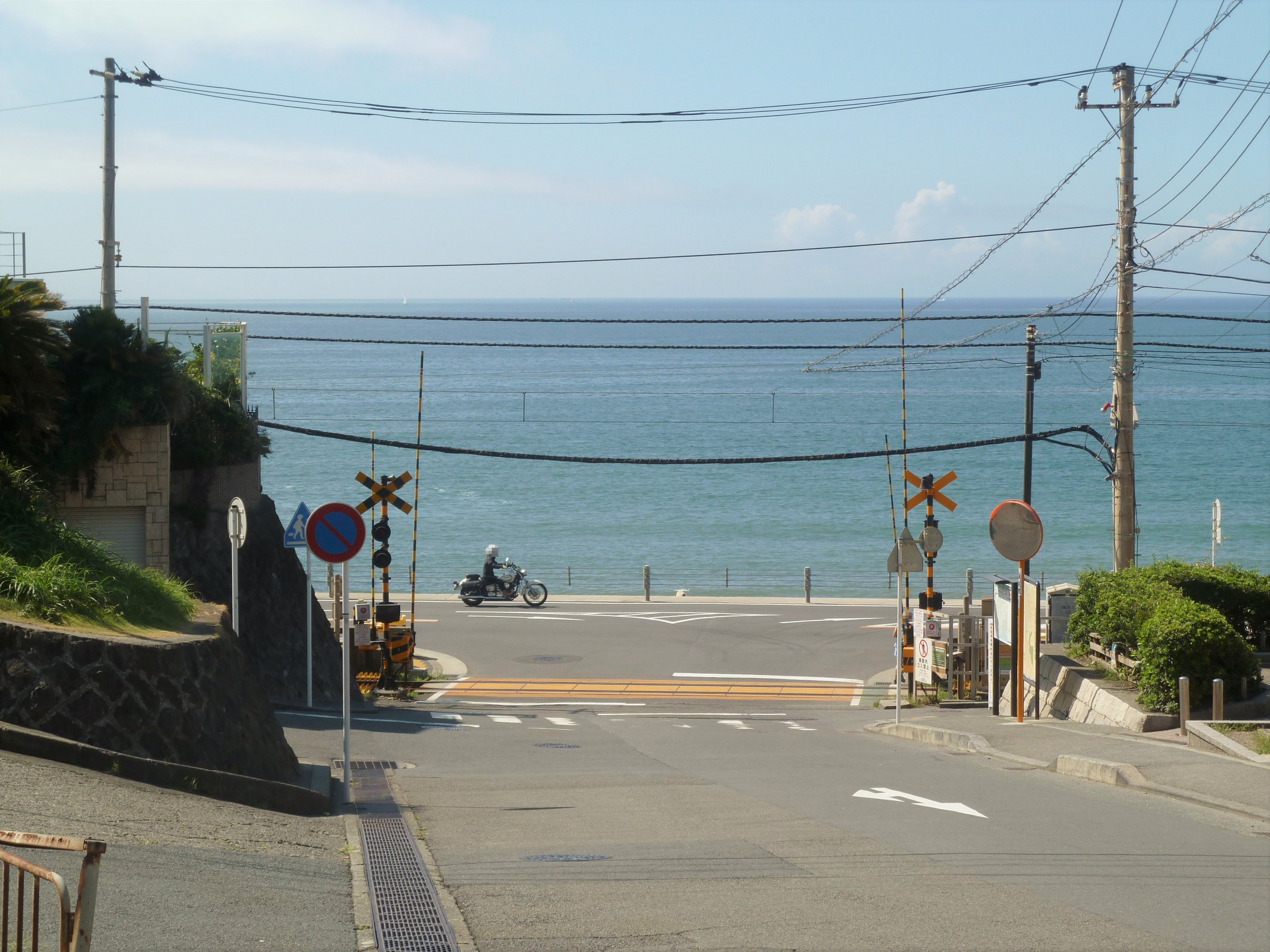
View of the railway crossing and Sagami Bay in the background, August 2020

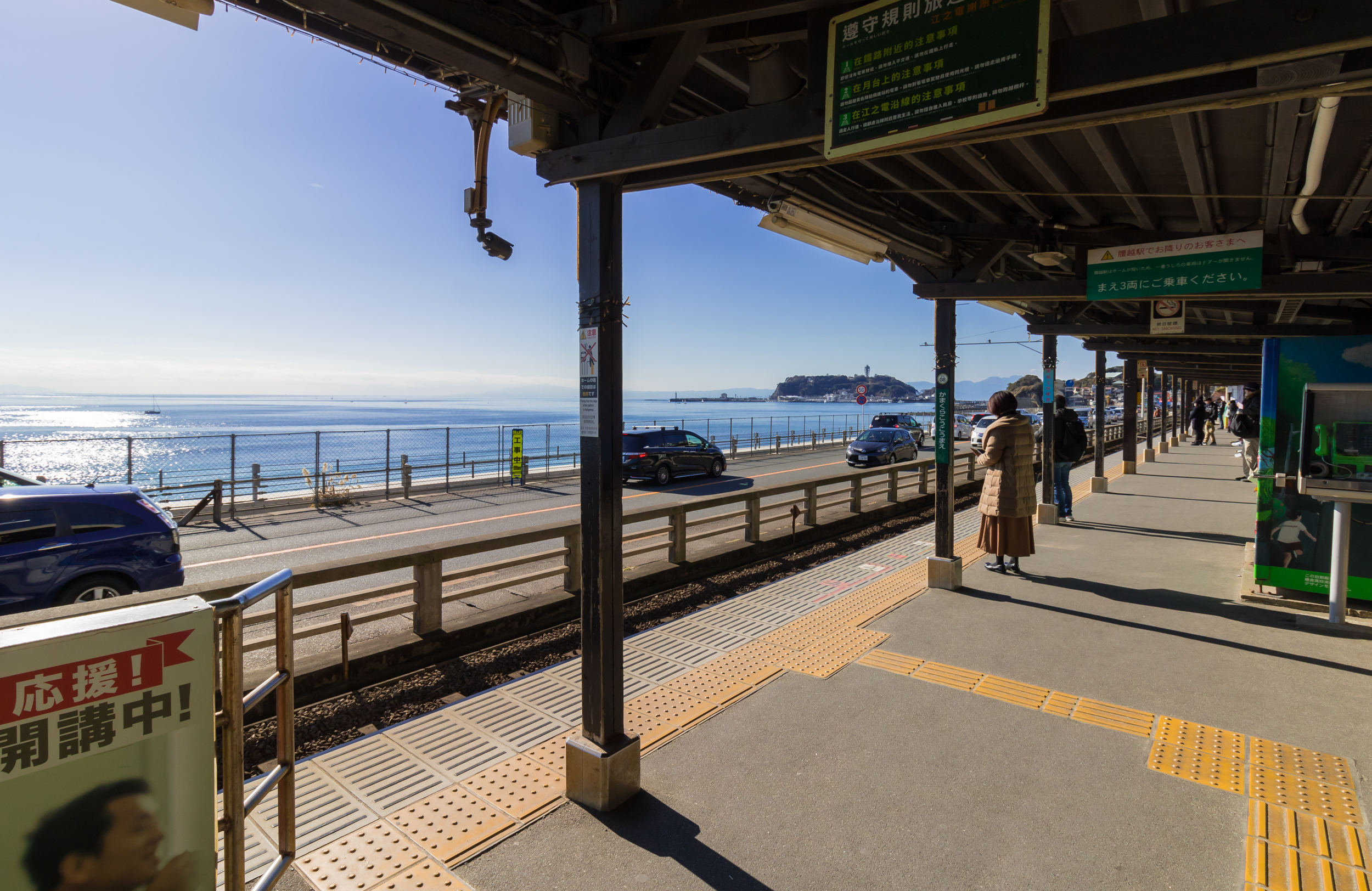
Platform, January 2019

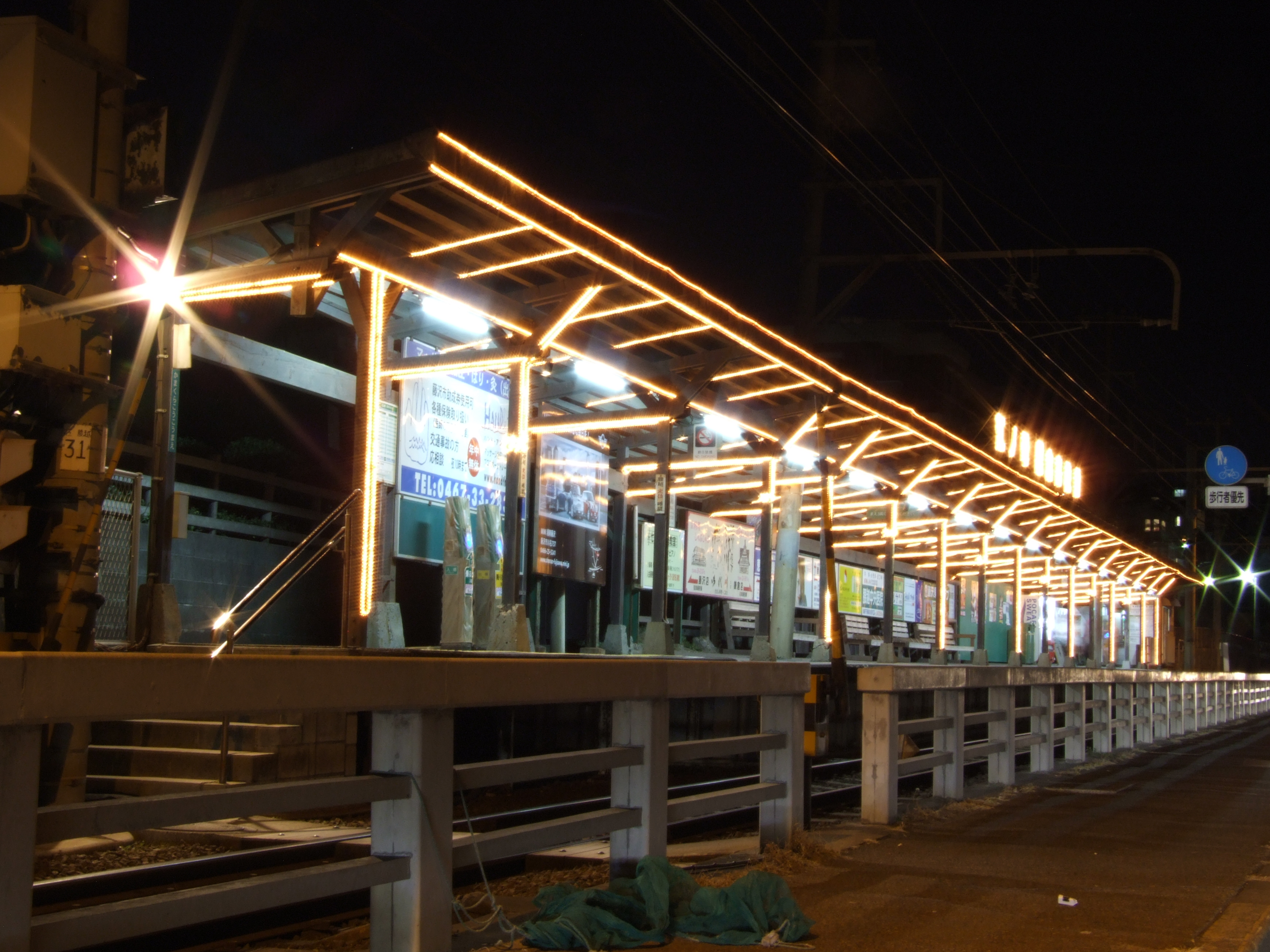
Platform at night, January 2009
