= Michihito Fujii =

Japanese filmmaker (born 1986)

- 藤井 道人
- Born: August 14, 1986; Shibuya, Tokyo, Japan
- Education: Nihon University
- Occupations: Film director; screenwriter; filmmaker
- Notable work: The Journalist (2019); The Last 10 Years (2022); 18×2 Beyond Youthful Days (2024); Faceless (2024)
- Website: Babel Label; Michihito Fujii on Instagram

Michihito Fujii (藤井 道人, Fujii Michihito; born August 14, 1986) is a Japanese filmmaker. He also has his own production company, Babel Label.

== History ==
=== Childhood ===
Fujii was born in Shibuya-ku, Tokyo. His older sister is Rumi Yoshida, a picture book author. His father was a banker and his mother a travel agent. Soon after he was born, they moved to New York City due to his father's job transfer and he lived in Manhattan until he was 4 years old. His grandfather was a doctor from Tainan, Taiwan, and an overseas Chinese who came to Japan. He started kendo at the age of three under the influence of his father, who was a kendo instructor. Later, he moved to Nakano, Tokyo, and during his elementary and junior high school years, he attended Tokyo Shudokan in Nakano, where he worked hard at kendo and won second place in Tokyo in the fifth grade. When he entered high school, he was scouted as a special kendo student by a strong school, but the strong schools were all boys schools. Fujii wanted to enroll in a co-ed school, so he went to Rissho High School, the same school as his kendo instructor. After entering high school, he became interested in movies, and it was his habit to stop by the video rental shop in front of the local station every day after kendo club activities to rent one movie and go home. At the time, his favorite films included Michel Gondry's Eternal Sunshine of the Spotless Mind, Wong Kar-wai's Chungking Express, and Shunji Iwai's Swallowtail Butterfly. He later said that this feeling of "not understanding" was important to him, even though at the time he still did not understand much after watching many film works. He liked the screenplay for Eternal Sunshine of the Spotless Mind, which inspired him to become a filmmaker. He originally thought of becoming a screenwriter.

=== Early career ===
After he enrolled at Nihon University, he joined the film production club and spent his time making independent films, commercials, and music videos. In college, he studied under screenwriter Kenji Aoki. According to Fujii, however, his scriptwriting did not improve much, and he eventually decided to pursue directing. He often ran short of money and relied on his seniors who worked in the video industry to earn money by getting making-of jobs from commercial production companies and working as an offline editor. He once considered becoming a music video director, inspired by Michel Gondry and Spike Jonze. He did not find a job after college and thought he could make it as a freelancer in the video industry, but he had no work at all during his first year. In 2010, he founded the film production company Babel Label with his college friends. After the company was established he worked anything related to video, including direct-to-video, television advertisement, music video and variety shows, in order to make money, in addition to producing his independent films. According to Fujii, television advertisement and music videos are approached differently than films, and he believed that there were many directors who were better than he was, so he did them solely to earn money for his films.

=== Career ===
Fujii made his commercial directorial debut in 2014 with the film Oh! Father. The film is based on a novel by Kotaro Isaka, and Fujii was initially involved as a screenwriter, he was a stand-in for a director who left halfway through. However the film failed at the box office. According to Fujii, he was unable to give precise instructions to his staff, whose average age was in the 50s. He lost confidence for a while and immersed himself in independent filmmaking for a while after this. Later in 2018 he returned to commercial films with We Are.

He said his twenties were a dark time for him, as he was not accepted by the world, and in 2016 he went to Taiwan, his grandfather's homeland, on journey of self-discovery and stayed in Taipei. There he met Toyoharu Kitamura (Japanese: 北村豊晴, Chinese: 北村豐晴), who introduced him to Taiwanese film workers. Fujii went to the production company that produced one of his favorite films, Monga, to ask them to let him make a film in Taiwan. Producer Roger Huang (黃江豐), happened to be there at the time. Fujii did not get the job because he was still unknown at the time, but Roger later watched The Journalist and offered Fujii a chance to make 18×2 Beyond Youthful Days.

Fujii consulted actor Shinnosuke Abe about his frustration with his work Oh! Father, and together with Abe and actor Takayuki Yamada, they spent four years since 2013 working on the script for Day and Night. In 2018, Fujii received a call from producer Mitsunobu Kawamura, who saw dailies of Day and Night and asked him to direct The Journalist. At first, Fujii turned it down twice because he was not interested in politics or social issues, but Kawamura did not give up after that and eventually asked him three times to direct the film, which he accepted. The movie The Journalist was released in 2019 to great response and won the 43rd Japan Academy Film Prize for Picture of the Year, and Fujii became famous as a film director. After The Journalist, he was able to make a living solely from his film work, and although he had previously introduced himself as a videographer, but after this, he began calling himself a film director. The film was adapted into a six-part TV series for Netflix distribution in 2022, which Fujii also directed. After this film, Fujii and Kawamura hit it off and worked together on A Family and The Village until Kawamura's death in 2022.

In 2022, The Last 10 Years was released. In this film, Fujii spent a year filming the four seasons, expressing the feeling of the months and days as the seasons change. The film was a smash hit, grossing over $26 million in Japan, Korea, Hong Kong, and Vietnam combined.

In 2024, 18×2 Beyond Youthful Days was released. The film was a co-production between Taiwan and Japan. He said his dream of someday connecting with cinema across cultures and languages had come true. Fujii was 36 years old when he shot the film, the same age as the main character Jimmy. He said that this film was an opportunity for him to reflect on his life to date, and that he is proud to say that it is the beginning of the second chapter in his life as a director.

== Filmmaking and kendo ==
Fujii was so devoted to kendo that he practiced it 360 days out of 365 days a year from his childhood until he graduated from high school. In an interview about kendo and filmmaking, he said, "Filmmaking is similar to kendo team competition. Kendo is an individual sport, but the way we help each other in a group is similar to filmmaking." He said that the teachings of kendo naturally made him work with respect for others, and his rigorous training gave him patience, so he did not often felt hard to work as a film director. He used to be quite good at kendo, but according to Fujii, he is no longer able to do it because of an injury to his right leg in 2012.

== Relationships ==
He has been friends with actor Ryusei Yokohama since the 2016 release of Unrequited Love. At the time, neither Fujii nor Yokohama were yet successful. Since then, Yokohama appeared in Fujii's film We Are, the music video for amazarashi's On that night when I couldn't be the future (未来になれなかったあの夜に), and DIVOC-12, a Netflix TV series The Journalist, which was shot at the COVID-19 pandemic. Fujii said that Yokohama is his favorite actor whom he has worked with since their indie days, and "Just as Akira Kurosawa has Toshiro Mifune and Kiyoshi Kurosawa has Koji Yakusho, if I need a young actor, I would be the first to join forces with Ryusei Yokohama." Fujii also said that at times, "I feel like Ryusei is a part of my body," and that he will work with him from the script development because he understands that he will perform as expected.

== Awards and nominations ==
Years	Awards	Category	Nominated work	Result	Ref.
2020	43rd Japan Academy Film Prize	Picture of the Year	The Journalist	Won	
2020	43rd Japan Academy Film Prize	Director of the Year	The Journalist	Nominated	
2020	43rd Japan Academy Film Prize	Screenplay of the Year	The Journalist	Nominated	
2020	74th Mainichi Film Awards	Excellence Film	The Journalist	Won	
2024	61st Golden Horse Awards	Best Adapted Screenplay	18×2 Beyond Youthful Days	Nominated	
2024	49th Hochi Film Awards	Best Director	18×2 Beyond Youthful Days	Nominated	
2025	48th Japan Academy Film Prize	Director of the Year	Faceless	Won	
2025	67th Blue Ribbon Awards	Best Director	18×2 Beyond Youthful Days	Nominated	

== Filmography ==
=== Feature films ===
Year	Title	Notes
2011	Slowland	
2012	Where Is The Better Future Of A Fake Town	
2013	Shake Hands	
2014	Oh! Father	(Note: Special invitation film for the 2013 Tokyo International Film Festival, Special invitation film for the 2014 Okinawa International Film Festival)
2014	Phantom Limb	(Note: Best Screenplay Award at the 9th Asian Youth Film Festival)
2015	Tokyo City Girl	(Note: He also served as producer. He directed "17 Years Old, Summer", one of the omnibus films)
2015	7s	
2016	Unrequited Love	(Note: Directed one part of the omnibus, "A Liar's Love")
2017	Innocent of Blood	
2018	Devil	
2018	We Are	
2019	Day and Night	
2019	The Journalist	
2020	The Brightest Roof in the Universe	
2021	A Family	
2021	Ghost in the Shell: SAC_2045: Sustainable War	Animated film
2022	The Last 10 Years	
2023	The Village	
2023	Hard Days	
2023	Ghost in the Shell: SAC_2045: The Last Human	Animated film
2024	18×2 Beyond Youthful Days	
2024	The Parades	
2024	Faceless	
2025	A Light in the Harbor	
2026	You, Like a Star	
2027	Leviathan	

=== Television series ===
Year	Title	Ref.
2016	Kanae Minato Suspense: Desired Homeland "The Thread of Cloud" (Note: One of a trilogy.)	
2017	Samurai Gourmet	
2017	Million Yen Women	
2017	Shinjuku Seven	
2018	I Rode Around Japan On A Motorbike - For That Girl	
2018	Love begins with an after-school chime	
2018	Company Ain't No School	
2019	Japan Rags to riches travelogue	
2019	I Will Return Today	
2019	More Than Likes	
2019	The Buzzing Family Across the Street	
2021	Trapped Lemming	
2021	Mushoboke	(Note: as the planning and production)
2021	Avalanche	
2021	Company Ain't No School: The New Generation Strikes Back	
2022	The Journalist	
2022	The Sealer	
2023	Informer	
2024	We are Transparent	(Note: as producer)
2025	Last Samurai Standing	

=== Short films ===
Year	Title	Ref.
2011	A dust	
2012	A Little World	
2013	Kanata, far away	
2013	Return of the bad girl	
2013	After School for Warriors	
2013	On a Starry Night	
2013	Seven Days of Akira and Poppy	
2014	Tokyo	
2014	Cuddle Close Together	
2016	All of Us, One Love	(Note: Lying Love)
2021	DIVOC-12	(Note: A story without a name, Anna)
2022	Mirrorliar Films Season4	(Note: A story without a name, Tokyo Moratorium)

=== Music videos ===
- "Uruubito" by Radwimps
- "Celebration" by Ukaskazy
- "To the Future" by Naoto Inti Raymi
- "The World" by Haruka to Miyuki
- "How to start" by HUSH
- "On that night when I couldn't be the future" "Swipe" by amazarashi
- "Now and Then We" by Kaya Kiyohara
- "Worst You Just Dumped Me" by Misako Uno
- "Familia" by millennium parade
- "Hitsu Zetsu" by Radwimps

=== Commercials ===
- Golden Moment (2014 American Express)
- Modern Samurai Isao Machii Cuts Many Objects with "Iaido" Sword Strokes (2015 SoftBank Group)
- Hoiku hiroba "Sunrise" (2016 Neo-career)
- For Busy Dads (2016 Wacoal)
- Pokémon Sun and Moon - Train on. (2016 Nintendo)
- Love begins with an after-school chime (2018 Ymobile)
- Shiseido Recipest (2019 Shiseido)
- Pure Potato Potato Chips (2024 Koikeya)
