= Masterpieces: The Best Science Fiction of the Century =

2001 anthology edited by Orson Scott Card

- Editor: Orson Scott Card
- Language: English
- Genre: Science fiction
- Publisher: Ace Books
- Publication date: 2001
- Publication place: United States
- Media type: Print (Hardcover and paperback)
- Pages: 432
- ISBN: 0-441-00864-X
- OCLC: 47243968
- Dewey Decimal: 813/.087620805 21
- LC Class: PS648.S3 M38 2001

Masterpieces: The Best Science Fiction of the Century (2001) is a science fiction anthology edited by American writer Orson Scott Card. It contains twenty-six stories by different writers.

== Contents ==
The stories in this book are:

=== The Golden Age ===
- "Call me Joe" by Poul Anderson (1957)
- "All You Zombies" by Robert A. Heinlein (1958)
- "Tunesmith" by Lloyd Biggle, Jr. (1957)
- "A Saucer of Loneliness" by Theodore Sturgeon (1953)
- "Robot Dreams" by Isaac Asimov (1986)
- "Devolution" by Edmond Hamilton (1936)
- "The Nine Billion Names of God" by Arthur C. Clarke (1953)
- "A Work of Art" by James Blish (1956)
- "Dark They Were, and Golden-Eyed" by Ray Bradbury (1949)

=== The New Wave ===
- "'Repent, Harlequin!' Said the Ticktockman" by Harlan Ellison (1965)
- "Eurema's Dam" by R.A. Lafferty (1972)
- "Passengers" by Robert Silverberg (1968)
- "The Tunnel under the World" by Frederik Pohl (1955)
- "Who Can Replace a Man?" by Brian W. Aldiss (1958)
- "The Ones Who Walk Away From Omelas" by Ursula K. Le Guin (1973)
- "Inconstant Moon" by Larry Niven (1973)

=== The Media Generation ===
- "Sandkings" by George R.R. Martin (1979)
- "The Road Not Taken" by Harry Turtledove (1985)
- "Dogfight" by William Gibson and Michael Swanwick (1985)
- "Face Value" by Karen Joy Fowler (1986)
- "Pots" by C. J. Cherryh (1985)
- "Snow" by John Crowley (1985)
- "Rat" by James Patrick Kelly (1986)
- "Bears Discover Fire" by Terry Bisson (1990)
- "A Clean Escape" by John Kessel (1986)
- Tourists" by Lisa Goldstein (1985)
- "One" by George Alec Effinger (1995)
