= Port of Anping =

Port in Tainan, Taiwan

Port of Anping 安平港
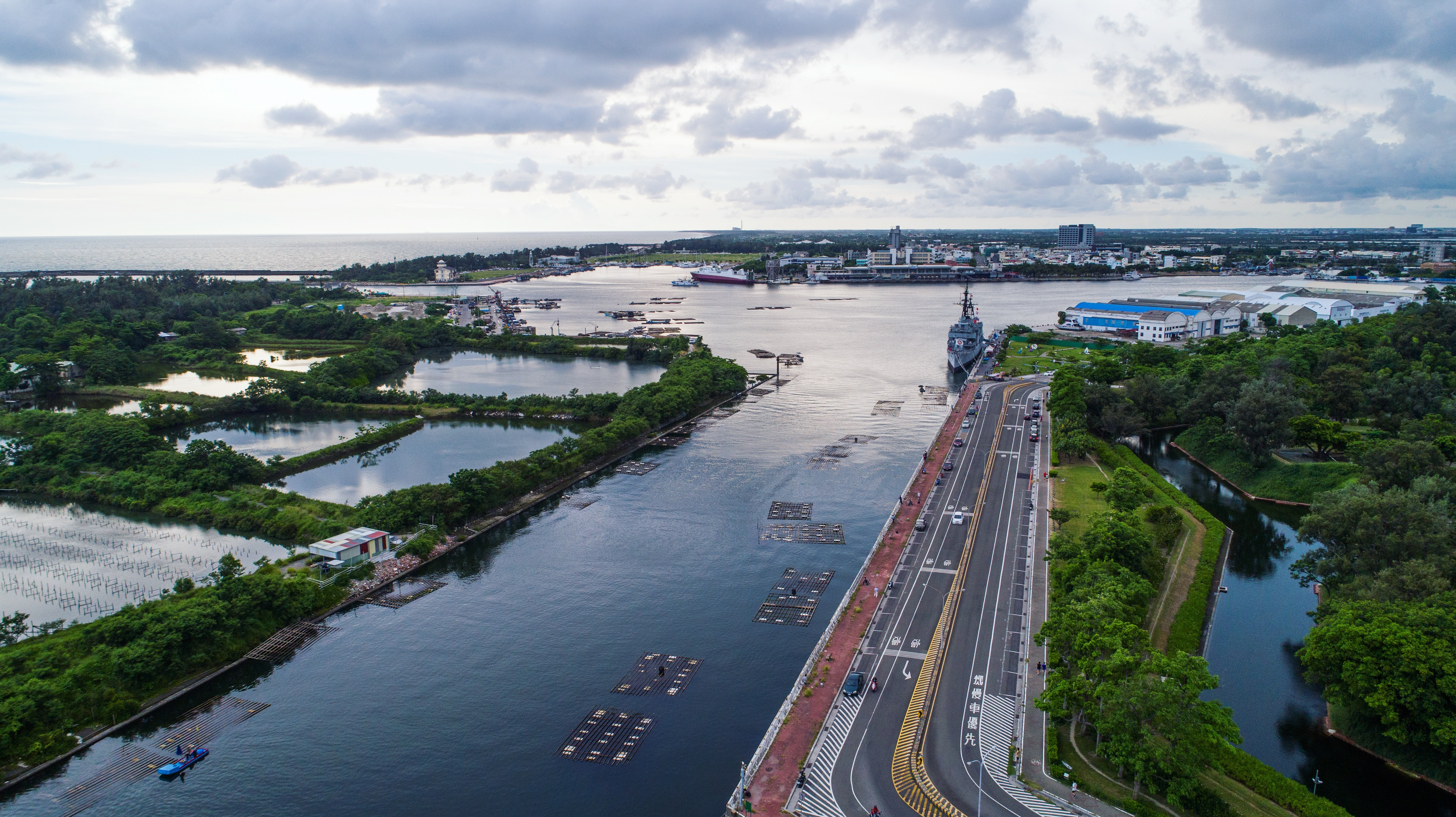
- Interactive map of Port of Anping 安平港
- Location in Taiwan

Location
- Location: Taiwan
- Coordinates: 22°59′29″N 120°09′04″E

The Port of Anping (Chinese: 安平港) is located in Tainan in South District and Anping District.

In the early 20th century, the main port's entrance was located near the northern part of Yuguang Borough. However, this shallow entrance was only accessible to pleasure craft and fishing vessels. In the 1970s, a channel deep enough to accommodate 6,000-tonne cargo ships was dug, separating Yugang Borough from the main island of Taiwan, after which the locality became unofficially known as Yuguang Island. The port was designated an international commercial port in 1997.
