= Klook (company) =

Travel company based in Hong Kong

Klook Travel Technology Ltd
- Type: Private
- Industry: Travel technology
- Founded: September 2014; 12 years ago in Hong Kong
- Founder: Ethan Lin, Eric Gnock Fah
- Headquarters: Hong Kong
- Area served: Worldwide
- Key people: Ethan Lin (Co-Founder, Chairman & CEO); Eric Gnock Fah (Co-Founder, President & COO)
- Products: Online travel service
- Website: www.klook.com

Klook is an online travel company based in Hong Kong that serves the international market in providing reservations or bookings and tickets to experiences such as tours and experiences, tourist attractions, public transport and accommodation. It achieved unicorn status in 2018.

== History ==
Chief Executive Officer Ethan Lin and Chief Operations Officer Eric Gnock Fah founded the company in September 2014.

Klook raised US$30 million in a Series B fundraising led by Sequoia Capital to support the company's expansion into International markets.

Klook achieved unicorn status in 2018 following a US$200 million funding round that raised its valuation above US$1 billion. Previously, the company had raised a total of US$721.5 million over seven funding rounds.

In 2020, Klook shifted its focus from cross-border markets towards domestic markets. The company moved away from traditional day tour products and introduced new services such as "staycations" that bundle hotel stays with additional experiences like restaurants, spa visits, or nearby attractions. Additionally, Klook expanded its mobility options, adding car rental services to its existing intercity train reservations, with a particular emphasis on markets in South Korea, Taiwan, and Australia.

The official icon for Klook

In 2022 they announced a partnership with online ticket booking service Tiqets.

In December 2023, Klook secured US$210 million in a series E+ funding round. Bessemer Venture Partners led the funding round, with participation from BPEA EQT, Atinum Investment, and Golden Vision Capital. Citigroup, JPMorgan Chase, and HSBC provided additional banking facilities.

To support this transition, Klook raised around $720 million. This funding facilitated its transition to an all-purpose online travel agency that primarily caters to domestic travel.

Klook has collaborated with Grab, a ride-hailing platform in Asia, to integrate its inventory into Grab's platform. This partnership allows Grab users to book activities through Klook.

The company achieved cash flow positivity in mid-2023.

On 10 November 2025, Klook filed for a US IPO, but withdrew on its filing on 16 October 2026, citing market conditions.
