= Opus: Rocket of Whispers =

2017 video game

- Developer: SIGONO
- Publisher: SIGONO
- Engine: Unity
- Platforms: Android; iOS; macOS; Microsoft Windows; Nintendo Switch
- Release: Android, iOS; September 14, 2017; macOS, Windows; February 8, 2018; Nintendo Switch; March 22, 2018
- Genre: Adventure
- Mode: Single-player

Opus: Rocket of Whispers (Note: Chinese: OPUS：靈魂之橋; pinyin: OPUS：líng hún zhī qiáo; lit. 'OPUS: Bridge of Souls') (stylized as OPUS: Rocket of Whispers) is a 2D adventure game developed by Taiwanese independent studio SIGONO. It is the second installment of the Opus series that began with Opus: The Day We Found Earth, and focuses on story and exploration, much like its predecessor. It was continued with Opus: Echo of Starsong.

The story takes place after an apocalyptic plague in the distant future, and follows the journey of a witch and the son of a rocket engineer who set out to launch a space burial for the spirits whose lives were taken by the plague. The game was first released on September 14, 2017, for iOS and Android, with the macOS and Windows versions coming to Steam on February 8, 2018, and the Nintendo Switch version coming on March 22, 2018.

== Gameplay ==
Opus: Rocket of Whispers is a third person adventure game where players explore the world through a top-down view. Story progression is unlocked in the form of dialogues, item descriptions, and cutscenes as players reach further areas or pick up key items. In Crafting in order to build a rocket for the space burial, players control John, the son of a rocket engineer, to explore and find material throughout the wasteland. As he explores further, players will craft equipment to help him gain access to new areas. These areas often hold key items that John will bring back to Fei Lin, the witch. Players then control Fei to convert the items into rocket components, which will be used to build and launch the rocket. As players search for material, they will come across areas with buildings and ruins that can be explored for artifacts. The dialogue and descriptions these artifacts unlock provide clues as to what happened before and during the apocalyptic plague. Dialogue between John and Fei about their past can also be unlocked as players complete each rocket component.

== Plot ==
Opus: Rocket of Whispers takes place after an apocalyptic plague in the distant future. Being the only survivor among his family and friends, John Mason, the son of a rocket engineer, spends most of his days in his family's rocket factory. Haunted by the memories of his loved ones, John lived for years in isolation, leaving him jaded and cynical, until one day, on his way out, he runs into a witch who only recently awoke from cryogenic sleep.

Fei Lin, the witch, is a survivor of the Church of Earthology, a religion that worships the blue planet, and has a long tradition of holding space burials for the deceased by launching their spirits into the cosmos to bring them peace. Despite his initial distrust, Fei convinces John to assist her in launching a space burial by offering him relief from his grief.

== Music ==
The original soundtrack of Opus: Rocket of Whispers was digitally released on September 14, 2017, on Bandcamp

The digital soundtrack includes a collection of 42 songs from the game, with 1 additional bonus track. All tracks are written, performed, produced and mixed by Triodust, mastered by Hsu, Chia-Wei.

== Reception ==
Reception

Aggregate score
Aggregator	Score
Metacritic	NS: 72/100

According to review aggregator website Metacritic, it has a score of 72/100. The game has received multiple awards and recognitions, including Google Play Editors’ Choice, “Excellence in Art” at the 2016 International Mobile Gaming Awards Southeast Asia. “Best Upcoming Game” at the 2018 International Mobile Gaming Awards China and “Best Narration” at the 2018 Taipei Game Show Indie Game Awards.
