= Opus: Echo of Starsong =

- Developer: SIGONO
- Publisher: SIGONO
- Platforms: macOS; Microsoft Windows; Nintendo Switch; Xbox One; Xbox Series X/S; iOS; PlayStation 5; Android
- Release: macOS, Windows; September 1, 2021; Nintendo Switch; May 11, 2022; Xbox One, Series X/S; August 25, 2022; iOS; November 17, 2022; Android; CHN: July 26, 2024; PlayStation 5; February 4, 2026
- Genre: Adventure
- Mode: Single-player

Opus: Echo of Starsong (Note: Chinese: OPUS：龍脈常歌; pinyin: OPUS： lóng mài cháng gē; lit. 'OPUS: The Dragon Vein Song') (stylized as OPUS: Echo of Starsong) is a text-driven side-scrolling adventure game developed by Taiwanese independent studio SIGONO. It is the third installment of the Opus series, after Opus: The Day We Found Earth and Opus: Rocket of Whispers. Like its predecessors, the game focuses on story, puzzles and exploration.

The game was released for macOS and Windows on September 1, 2021, to strong critical reception. An enhanced version with voice acting titled Opus: Echo of Starsong - Full Bloom Edition (Note: Chinese: OPUS：龍脈常歌 -最終版-; pinyin: OPUS： lóng mài cháng gē - zuì zhōng bǎn -; lit. 'OPUS: The Dragon Vein Song -Final Edition-') was released for Nintendo Switch on May 11, 2022, as an update for macOS and Windows on May 19, 2022, for Xbox One and Xbox Series X/S via Xbox Game Pass on August 25, 2022, and for PlayStation 5 on February 4, 2026. A mobile version was released for iOS on November 17, 2022. An Android version was exclusively launched on July 26, 2024, on the mainland China mobile game distribution platform TapTap, and is currently available only in Chinese.

== Gameplay ==
In Opus: Echo of Starsong, the player's main goal is to fly their spaceship across the planetary system Thousand Peaks, and find asteroids known as lumen caves. Reaching certain locations during their journey will advance the story, prompting players to find their next destination. Gameplay alternates between dialogue, exploration, resource management, and puzzle-solving.

=== Space Navigation ===
In space navigation mode, players can move a crosshair along a top-down map of Thousand Peaks, and select which location to visit. Flying to any location requires fuel, and may trigger situational encounters where players have a chance to gain rewards, or lose resources. Some locations, such as lumen caves, are hidden until players find its starsong, sound patterns that originate from the hidden locations.

=== Exploring Locations ===
When players reach a location, they get a view of its appearance, and backstory that reveals the history of Thousand Peaks. Each location also has a menu of activities players can engage in, which includes visiting a shop, visiting various locales, or searching for resources. Any one of the activities may also trigger encounters much like the ones during space navigation.

=== Recording Starsongs ===
During space navigation, players will be occasionally prompted to search for starsongs when they're within range of lumen caves. Doing so will trigger a puzzle sequence where the player character starts to sing in the center of the screen, while orbs of light representing sources of starsongs surround her. Using the center as a pivot, players can rotate the orbs in any direction. The goal is to overlap the correct orb with the center, which can be determined by changes in the character's singing voice. Once the puzzle is solved, players will be rewarded with a starsong that reveals a lumen cave.

=== Exploring Lumen Caves ===
When players visit a lumen cave, the game's perspective is changed to a 2.5D side-scrolling view. Players can control their character to explore the environment, which will present points of interaction that reward players with lore, or resources. The environment also includes various contraptions that players must solve to progress.

=== Contraption Puzzles ===
Lumen caves contain contraptions that block off areas of the environment. These contraptions have circular surfaces covered in inscriptions, and must be activated with specific starsongs in order to open up. Once players find the correct starsong, the game will zoom in on the circular surface, and start playing the chosen starsong, with an equalizer interface appearing on top. The goal is to tune the starsong, so the equalizer bars overlap with the inscriptions. Once the puzzle is solved, players will gain access to the inner areas of the lumen cave.

== Plot ==
The game takes place in the fictional planetary system Thousand Peaks. Players take control of Jun Lee, an elderly adventurer who returns to an unnamed asteroid, claiming that there's an old promise he has yet to fulfill there. As he activates an ancient gate, he begins to think back on the woman he made his promise to, Eda, and the adventures they shared together decades ago.

Back then, Thousand Peaks was recovering from the Lumen War, a 20-year conflict that involved numerous factions from across the galaxy fighting over a valuable resource known as Lumen, which could be mined from the planetary system's asteroids. The war officially ended when the galactic megacorporation United Mining claimed an overwhelming victory, but they were unable to suppress the rampant piracy of lumen, so they passed regulations to allow any person who discovers lumen reserves to claim its mining rights, so long as they pay a percentage of the profits to United Mining. This began a period of lumen-seeking adventurers flooding into Thousand Peaks for a chance at fame and riches, and Jun was one of them.

Jun was an exiled noble from the planetary system East Ocean, who escaped to Thousand Peaks, along with his guardian Kay Volan, to claim lumen mines of his own to redeem himself to his clan. During their search for leads to unclaimed lumen, they get into an argument with an intel trader over the authenticity of his intel until another adventurer, Edalune (nicknamed "Eda"), intervenes and purchases it off of the trader. After failing to convince Eda of his suspicions, Jun discovers that the intel is indeed a trap that leads to pirates who rob unsuspecting adventurers. Determined to warn Edalune of the danger, Jun and Kay decide to follow her ship to the pirate base, thus beginning their journey together.

== Reception ==
Reception

Aggregate score
Aggregator	Score
Metacritic	PC: 90/100; NS: 75/100

The game has received "universal acclaim" for the PC version and "generally favorable" reviews for the Switch version, according to review aggregator Metacritic, with strong praises being given to the game's story. Sisi Jiang of Kotaku called the game a "serious contender for [...] game of the year", though noted that the gameplay was "relatively simple". RPGFan gave the game a 90/100, with Audra Bowling praising the "creativity and care put into the story".
