= Shōnan (disambiguation) =

Shōnan, shounan, or shonan may refer to:

== Education ==
- Shonan Fujisawa Campus, a research-oriented campus of Keio University located in the city of Fujisawa, Kanagawa Prefecture, Japan
  - Keio Shonan-Fujisawa Junior and Senior High School, a junior and senior high school in Fujisawa, Kanagawa Prefecture, Japan
- Shonan Institute of Technology, a private university in Fujisawa, Kanagawa, Japan
  - Shonan Institute of Technology High School, a high school in Kanagawa, Japan
- Shonan Junior College, a private junior college in Yokosuka, Kanagawa Prefecture, Japan
- Shonan Junior College of Technology, a private junior college in Yokohama, Japan

== Locations ==
- Shōnan, a region along the coast of Sagami Bay in Kanagawa Prefecture, Japan
- Shōnan, Chiba, a town in Higashikatsushika District, Chiba Prefecture, Japan
- Shōnan, the name of Singapore during the Japanese occupation

== People ==
- Yokoi Shōnan (1809-1869), a Bakumatsu and early Meiji period scholar and political reformer in Japan

Shōnan is also found in the names of several sumo wrestlers from Kanagawa Prefecture:

- Shōnannoumi Momotarō (born 1998), makuuchi-ranked wrestler
- Shōnanzakura Sōta (born 1998), former jonokuchi-ranked wrestler

== Sport ==
- Shonan Bellmare, a Japanese professional football (soccer) club
- Shonan Bellmare futsal, a Japanese professional futsal club
- Shonan BMW Stadium Hiratsuka, a multi-purpose stadium in Hiratsuka, Kanagawa, Japan

== Transport ==
- Shōnan (train), a commuter railway service on the Tōkaidō Main Line operated by JR East in Japan
- Shonan Monorail, a suspended monorail in Kamakura and Fujisawa, Kanagawa Prefecture, Japan
- Shōnan Station, a railway station on the Saitama New Urban Transit New Shuttle in Ageo, Saitama, Japan
- Shōnan-Enoshima Station, a monorail train station on the Shōnan Monorail in Fujisawa, Kanagawa Prefecture, Japan
- Shōnan-Fukasawa Station, a monorail train station on the Shōnan Monorail in Kamakura, Kanagawa Prefecture, Japan
- Shōnan-Machiya Station, a monorail train station on the Shōnan Monorail in Kamakura, Kanagawa Prefecture, Japan
- Shōnan–Shinjuku Line, a passenger railway service in Japan
- Shinshōnan Bypass, a 4-laned toll road in Kanagawa Prefecture, Japan

== Other ==
- MV Shōnan Maru 2, a Japanese security vessel operated by the Japanese Fisheries Agency
- Shonan Beach FM, a radio station in Kanagawa Prefecture, Japan
- Shonan Gold, a hybrid Japanese citrus
- Shonan Junai Gumi, a manga by Tohru Fujisawa
  - GTO: 14 Days in Shonan, a spinoff of the sequel to Shonan Junai Gumi
- Shōnan no Kaze, a Japanese four member reggae band

== See also ==
- Shōnen (disambiguation)
