= Ōfuna =

Ōfuna (大船) can refer to:

- Ōfuna Kannon, a Buddhist temple in Kamakura, Kanagawa, Japan
- Ōfuna Station, a railway station in Kamakura, Kanagawa, Japan
- Ōfuna (Prisoner of War Camp), World War II prisoner of war camp
- Ofuna, Kanagawa, an area in Kamakura city, Kanagawa Prefecture
