= Kataseyama Station =

Monorail station in Kamakura, Kanagawa Prefecture, Japan

Kataseyama 片瀬山

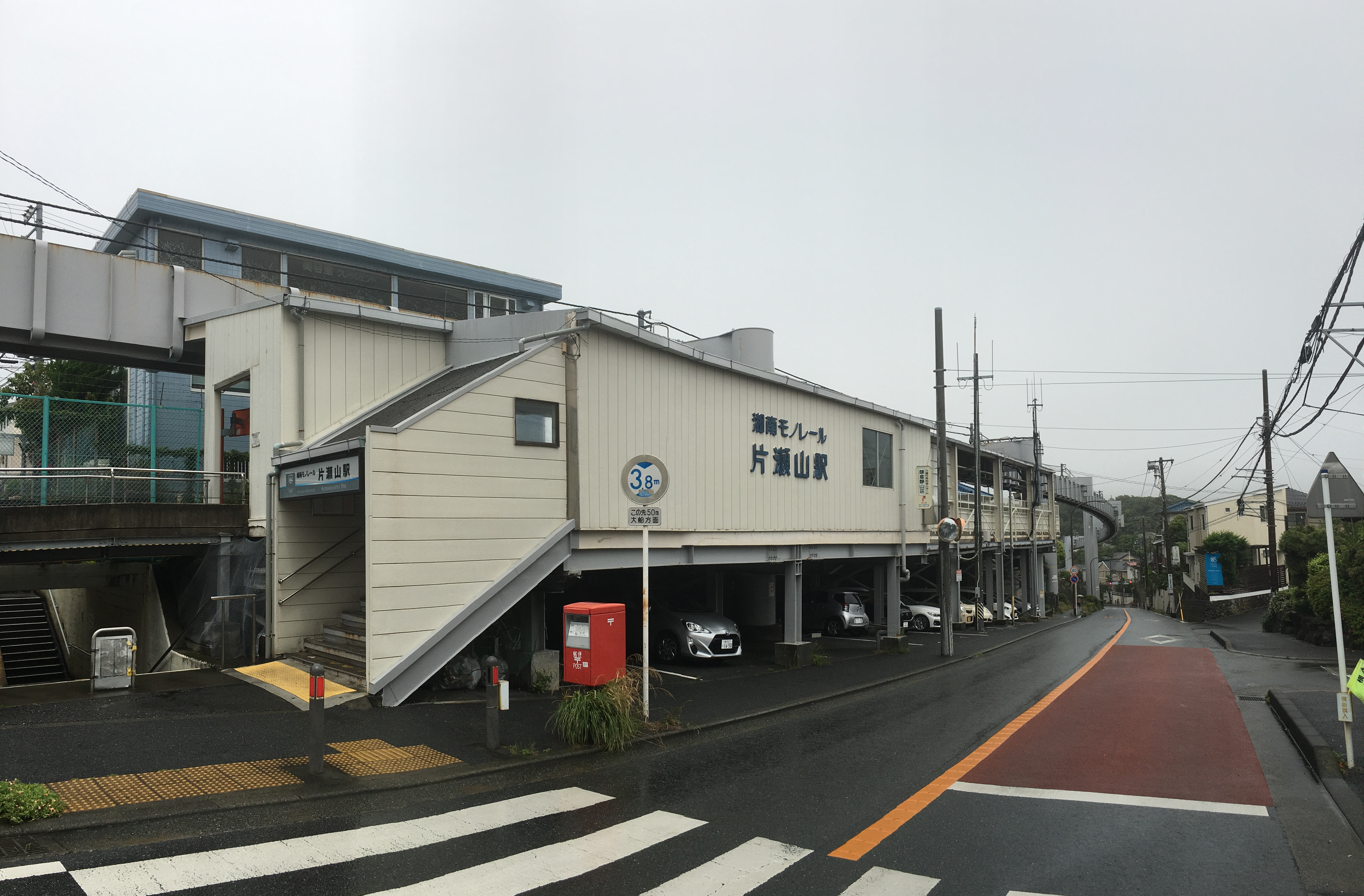
- Kataseyama Station, 2021

General information
- Location: 1-20-35 Nishi-Kamakura; Kamakura, Kanagawa; Japan
- Coordinates: 35°19′02″N 139°29′46″E
- Operator: Shōnan Monorail Company
- Line: Enoshima Line
- Distance: 5.5 km (3.4 mi) from Ōfuna
- Platforms: 1 side platform
- Tracks: 1
- Connections: Enoden Bus

Construction
- Structure type: Elevated
- Accessible: Yes

Other information
- Station code: SMR6

History
- Opened: 1 July 1971

Services
Preceding station	Shonan Monorail	Following station
Mejiroyamashita towards Shōnan-Enoshima	Enoshima Line	Nishi-Kamakura towards Ōfuna
Location
- Location of Kataseyama Station

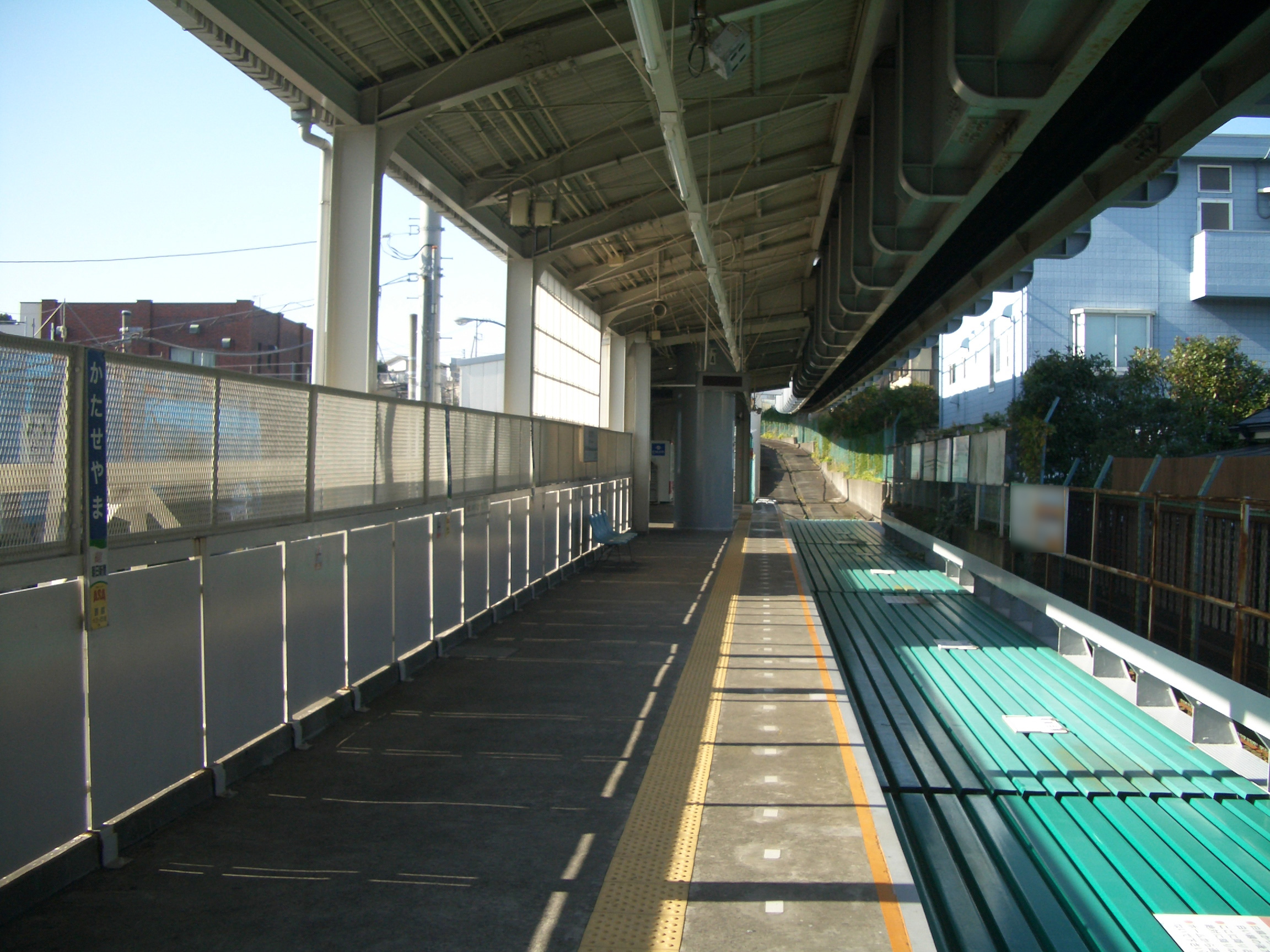
Station platform

Kataseyama Station (Japanese: 片瀬山駅, Hepburn: Kataseyama-eki) is a monorail train station on the Shōnan Monorail Enoshima Line in Kamakura, Kanagawa Prefecture, Japan. It is 5.5 kilometres (3.4 mi) from the northern terminus of the Shōnan Monorail Enoshima Line at Ōfuna Station. It is an elevated station with single side platform serving bidirectional traffic, and is unattended.

== History ==
The station opened on 1 July 1971 as part of the line's second phase of construction, which extended its terminus to Shōnan-Enoshima Station.
