= Ōfuna, Kanagawa =

Ōfuna 大船
- View of Ōfuna in 2011
- Interactive map of Ōfuna
- Prefecture: Kanagawa Prefecture
- CIty: Kamakura

Population (2018)
  - Total: 43,039

Ōfuna (Japanese: 大船) is an area in Kamakura city located in Kanagawa prefecture, Japan. It had a town status until being abolished and incorporated into Kamakura city in 1948.

== Culture ==
=== Ōfuna Ondo ===
Ōfuna Ondo is a traditional ondo-style folk song that features Ōfuna area. It is said to have been created by the Shochiku film studio members following the studio's relocation to Ōfuna in 1936. With time, it ceased to be performed, and both its lyrics and choreography were lost. In 2007, the lyrics of the song were discovered, and a debate began about a possible revival of the song with new choreography, as part of a local community revitalization initiative.

== Transportation ==
=== Rail ===
JR East
Tōkaidō Line , Ueno-Tokyo Line, Shōnan–Shinjuku Line
- Ōfuna Station
Yokosuka Line, Shōnan–Shinjuku Line
- Kita-Kamakura Station
Keihin–Tōhoku Line, Negishi Line
■Shonan Monorail
- Fujimichō Station
