= Shōnen (disambiguation) =

Shōnen, shonen, or shounen (少年) is the Japanese word for "boy" or "minor".

Shōnen may also refer to:

- Shōnen manga, Japanese comics aimed at a young teen male target-demographic

== Music ==
- Shōnen Alice, a 2004 album by Japanese singer Maaya Sakamoto
- Shonen Knife, a Japanese pop punk band
  - Shonen Knife (album), a 1990 compilation album for the US market
- Tokyo Shōnen, a Japanese rock band

== People ==
- Shōnen Matsumura (松村 松年; 1872–1960), Japanese entomologist

== Publications ==
- Shōnen Maid, a Japanese manga series by Ototachibana
- Shōnen Onmyōji, a Japanese light novel series by Mitsuru Yūki

=== Magazines ===
- Shōnen Big Comic, a Japanese manga magazine published by Shogakukan
- Shōnen Book, a Japanese manga magazine published by Shueisha
- Shōnen Gaho, a Japanese manga magazine published by Shōnen Gahōsha
- Shonen Jump (magazine), a North American manga magazine published by Viz Media
- Shonen Magz, an Indonesian manga magazine published by Elex Media Komputindo
- Shōnen Sekai, a Japanese manga magazine published by Hakubunkan
- Shōnen Star, an Indonesian manga magazine published by Elex Media Komputindo
- Shōnen Sunday Super, a Japanese manga magazine published by Shogakukan
- Bessatsu Shōnen Magazine, a Japanese manga magazine published by Kodansha
- Gekkan Shōnen Jets, a Japanese manga magazine published by Hakusensha
- Monthly Shōnen Ace, a Japanese manga magazine published by Kadokawa Shoten
- Monthly Shōnen Champion, a Japanese manga magazine published by Akita Shoten
- Monthly Shōnen Jump, a Japanese manga magazine published by Shueisha
- Monthly Shōnen Magazine, a Japanese manga magazine published by Kodansha
- Monthly Shōnen Rival, a Japanese manga magazine published by Kodansha
- Monthly Shōnen Sirius, a Japanese manga magazine published by Kodansha
- Monthly Shōnen Sunday, a Japanese manga magazine published by Shogakukan
- Weekly Shōnen Champion, a Japanese manga magazine published by Akita Shoten
- Weekly Shōnen Jump, a Japanese manga magazine published by Shueisha
- Weekly Shonen Jump (American magazine), a North American digital manga magazine published by Viz Media
- Weekly Shōnen Magazine, a Japanese manga magazine published by Kodansha
- Weekly Shōnen Sunday, a Japanese manga magazine published by Shogakukan

== Other ==
- Shōnen (novel), a 1952 novel by Nobel-prize winner Yasunari Kawabata.
- Shōnen-ai (lit. "boy love"), a genre of Japanese manga featuring romantic relationships between young boys
- Shōnen Hollywood, a Japanese media franchise

== See also ==
- Japanese juvenile law, or shōnen hō
- Shōnen Jump (disambiguation)
- Shōnen Sunday (disambiguation)
- Shōnan (disambiguation)
- Shojo (disambiguation)
