= Mejiro =

Mejiro may refer to:

- Mejiro, Tokyo, is a residential district of Toshima, Tokyo, Japan, centered at Mejiro Station of Yamanote Line
- Another name for the warbling white-eye
- Kurosaki Dojo – formerly known as Mejiro Gym, a Japanese kickboxing/MMA gym founded by Kenji Kurosaki
- Mejiro Gym, a Dutch kickboxing gym founded by Jan Plas
- Racehorses owned by Mejiro Shouji Co Ltd. using the "Mejiro" crown name:
  - Mejiro Ardan
  - Mejiro Bright
  - Mejiro Dober
  - Mejiro McQueen (Japanese: メジロマックイーン, April 3, 1987 – April 3, 2006) a Japanese Thoroughbred racehorse and sire
  - Mejiro Palmer
  - Mejiro Ramonu
  - Mejiro Ryan
- Mejiro Station (目白駅, Mejiro-eki) is a railway station on the Yamanote Line in Toshima, Tokyo, Japan, operated by the East Japan Railway Company (JR East)
- Mejiro University (目白大学, Mejiro Daigaku) is a private university in Shinjuku, Tokyo, Japan
- Mejiro-no-Mori (目白の森, Mejiro-no-Mori) is a public wooded area in Toshima Ward, Tokyo, Japan
- Mejiroyamashita Station
- Juon Mejiro (目白 樹音, Mejiro Juon), a character from Japanese josei manga series Princess Jellyfish (Japanese: 海月姫, Hepburn: Kuragehime)
