= Shōnan-Fukasawa Station =

Monorail station in Kamakura, Kanagawa Prefecture, Japan

Shōnan-Fukasawa 湘南深沢

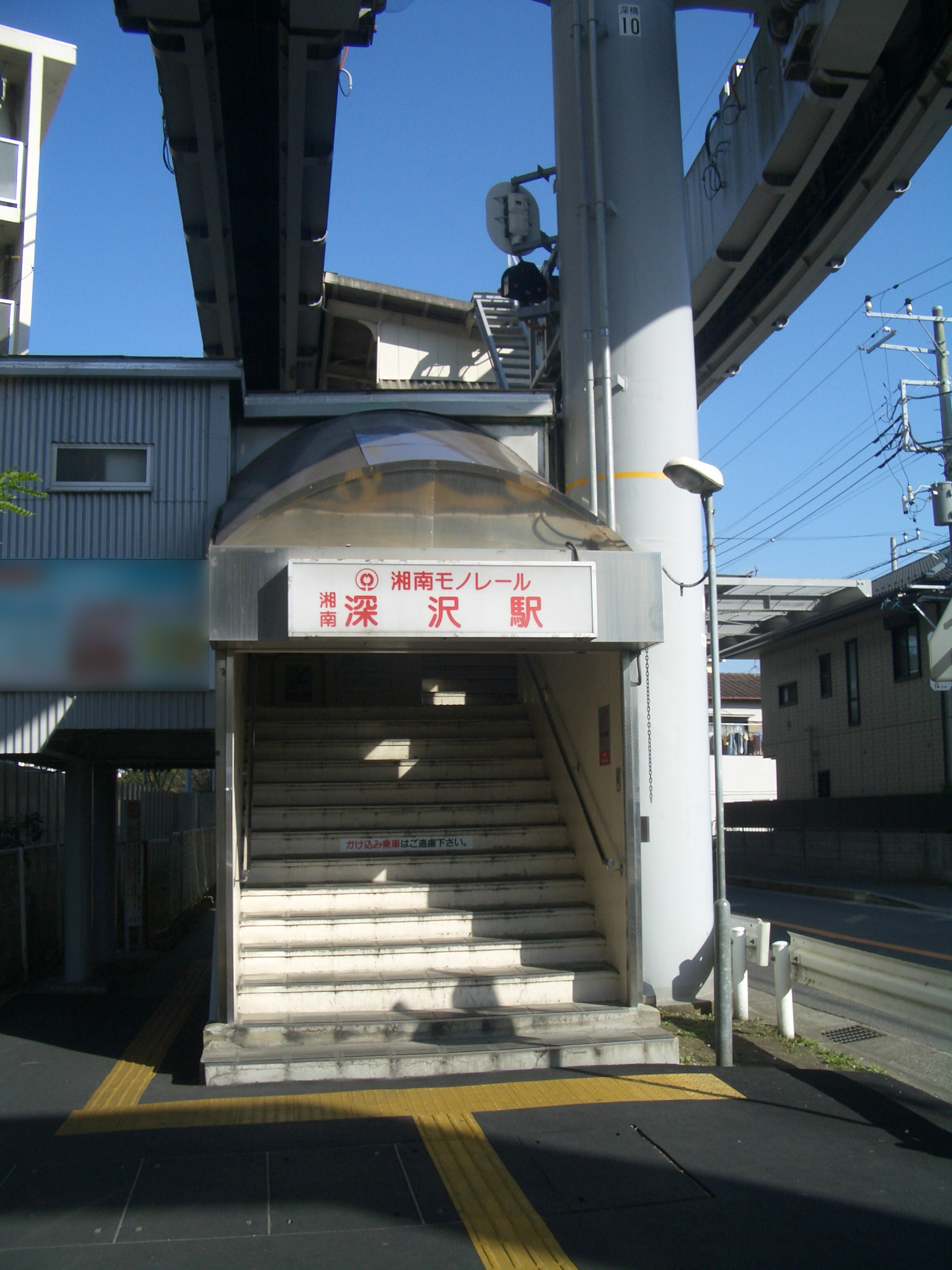
- Shōnan-Fukasawa Station

General information
- Location: Kajiwara 658; Kamakura, Kanagawa; Japan
- Coordinates: 35°19′58″N 139°31′08″E
- Operator: Shōnan Monorail Company
- Line: Enoshima Line
- Distance: 2.6 km (1.6 mi) from Ōfuna
- Platforms: 1 island platform
- Tracks: 2
- Connections: Enoden Bus

Construction
- Structure type: Elevated
- Accessible: No

Other information
- Station code: SMR4

History
- Opened: 7 March 1970

Services
| Preceding station | Shonan Monorail | Following station |
|---|---|---|
| Nishi-Kamakura towards Shōnan-Enoshima | Enoshima Line | Shōnan-Machiya towards Ōfuna |
Location

Shōnan-Fukasawa Station (Japanese: 湘南深沢駅, Hepburn: Shōnan-Fukasawa-eki) is a monorail train station on the Shōnan Monorail Enoshima Line located in Kamakura, Kanagawa Prefecture, Japan. It is located 2.6 kilometres (1.6 mi) from the northern terminus of the Shōnan Monorail Enoshima Line at Ōfuna Station.

== History ==
Shōnan-Fukasawa Station was opened on 7 March 1970 with the opening of the Enoshima Line between Ofuna and Nishi-Kamakura.

== Station layout ==
Shōnan-Fukasawa Station is an elevated station with a single island platform serving two tracks. The station is unattended.
