= Shōnan-Machiya Station =

Monorail station in Kamakura, Kanagawa Prefecture, Japan

Shōnan-Machiya 湘南町屋

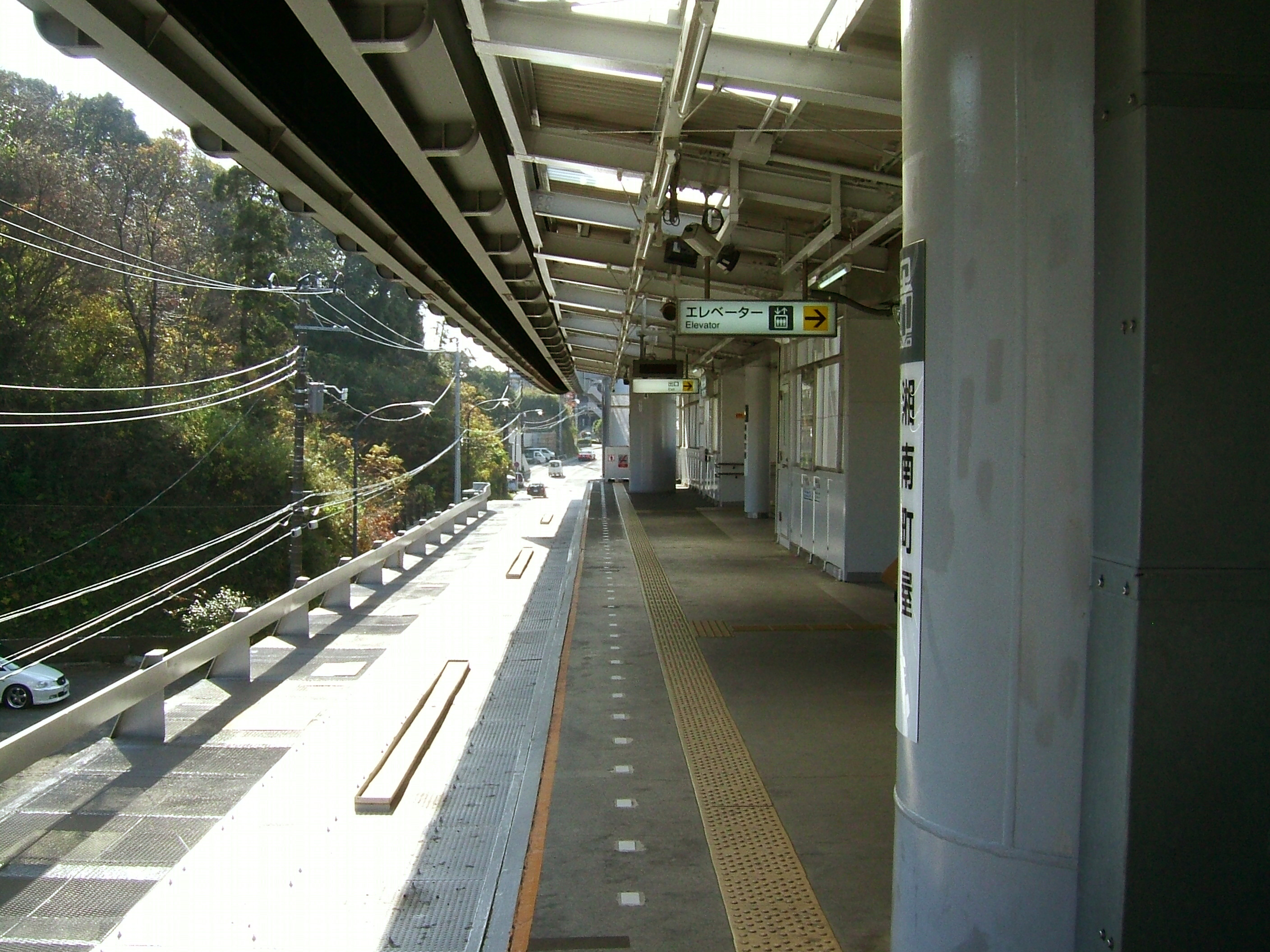
- Shōnan-Machiya Station

General information
- Location: Kamimichiya 722; Kamakura, Kanagawa; Japan
- Coordinates: 35°20′17″N 139°31′21″E
- Operator: Shōnan Monorail Company
- Line: Enoshima Line
- Distance: 2 km (1.2 mi) from Ōfuna
- Platforms: 1 side platform
- Tracks: 1
- Connections: Enoden Bus

Construction
- Structure type: Elevated
- Accessible: Yes

Other information
- Station code: SMR3
- Website: Official website

History
- Opened: 7 March 1970

Services
Preceding station	Shonan Monorail	Following station
Shōnan-Fukasawa towards Shōnan-Enoshima	Enoshima Line	Fujimichō towards Ōfuna
Location

Shōnan-Machiya Station (Japanese: 湘南町屋駅, Hepburn: Shōnan-Machiya-eki) is a monorail train station on the Shōnan Monorail Enoshima Line located in Kamakura, Kanagawa Prefecture, Japan. It is located 2 kilometres (1.2 mi) from the northern terminus of the Shōnan Monorail Enoshima Line at Ōfuna Station.

== History ==
Shōnan-Machiya Station was opened on 7 March 1970 with the opening of the Enoshima Line between Ofuna and Nishi-Kamakura.

The station building was rebuilt in 2005.

== Station layout ==
Shōnan-Machiya Station is an elevated station with a single side platform serving one track. The station is unattended.
