= Fujimichō Station =

Fujimichō Station (富士見町駅) is the name of two train stations in Japan:

- Fujimichō Station (Kanagawa)
- Fujimichō Station (Tottori)
