= Nishi-Kamakura Station =

Monorail station in Kamakura, Kanagawa Prefecture, Japan

Nishi-Kamakura 西鎌倉

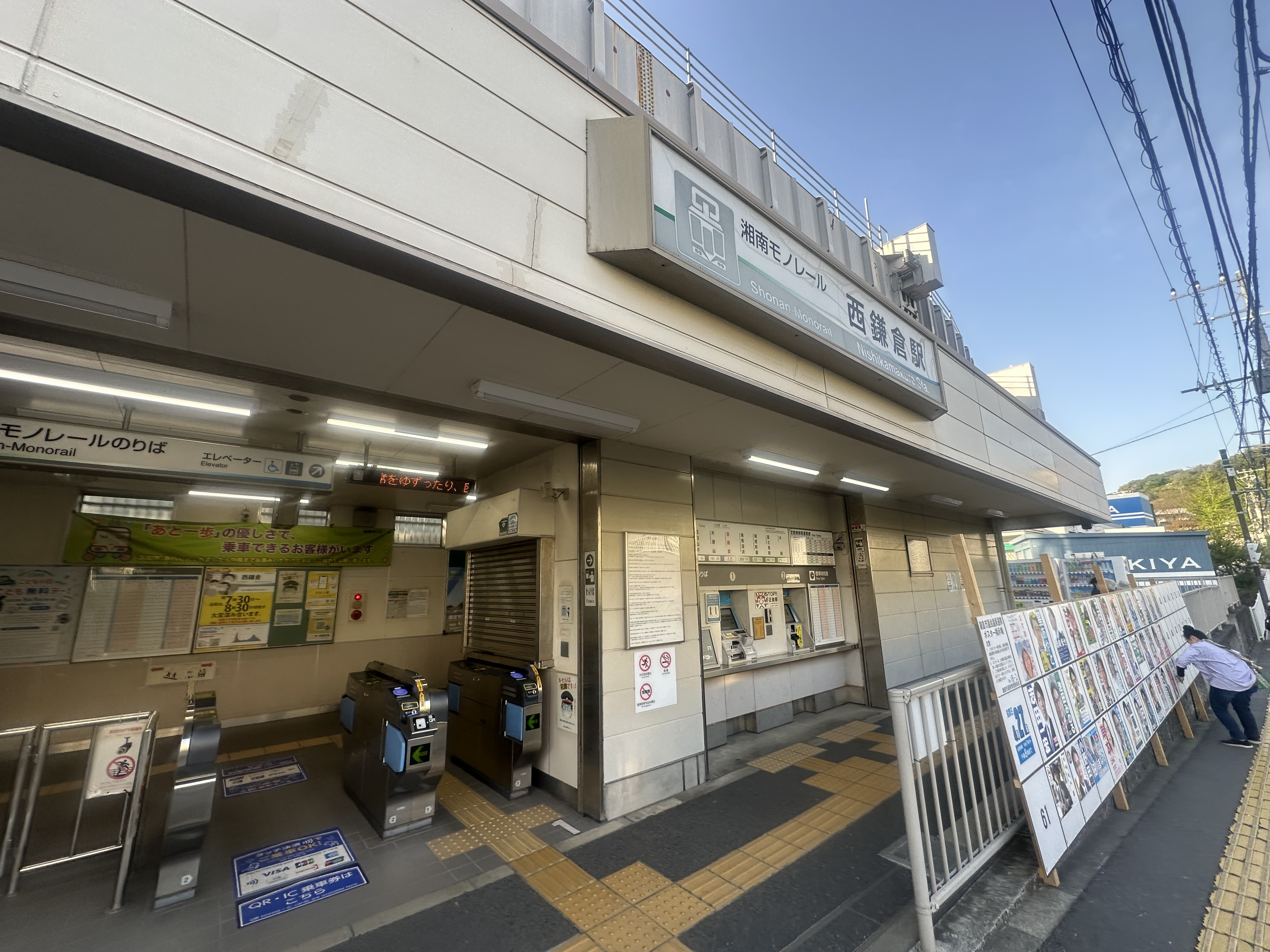
- Nishi-Kamakura Station

General information
- Location: 1-20-35 Nishi-Kamakura; Kamakura, Kanagawa; Japan
- Coordinates: 35°19′10″N 139°30′15″E
- Operator: Shōnan Monorail Company
- Line: Enoshima Line
- Distance: 4.7 km (2.9 mi) from Ōfuna
- Platforms: 1 island platform
- Tracks: 2
- Connections: Enoden Bus

Construction
- Structure type: Elevated
- Cycle facilities: Yes
- Accessible: Yes

Other information
- Station code: SMR5

History
- Opened: 7 March 1970

Services
Preceding station	Shonan Monorail	Following station
Kataseyama towards Shōnan-Enoshima	Enoshima Line	Shōnan-Fukasawa towards Ōfuna
Location

Nishi-Kamakura Station (Japanese: 西鎌倉駅, Hepburn: Nishi-Kamakura-eki) is a monorail train station on the Shōnan Monorail Enoshima Line located in Kamakura, Kanagawa Prefecture, Japan. It is located 4.7 kilometres (2.9 mi) from the northern terminus of the Shōnan Monorail Enoshima Line at Ōfuna Station.

== History ==
Nishi-Kamakura Station was opened on 7 March 1970 with the opening of the Enoshima Line as the initial terminal station. The line was extended to its present terminus at Shōnan-Enoshima Station on 1 July 1971.

== Station layout ==
Nishi-Kamakura Station is an elevated station with a single island platform serving two tracks. The station is unattended.
