= 湘南 =

湘南 may refer to:

- Shōnan (disambiguation)
  - Shōnan, the name of a region along the coast of Sagami Bay in Kanagawa Prefecture
  - Shōnan (train), a commuter railway service on the Tōkaidō Main Line operated by JR East in Japan
- Xiangnan (disambiguation)

== See also ==
- The dictionary definition of 湘 at Wiktionary
- The dictionary definition of 南 at Wiktionary
