= Hakusensha =

Japanese publishing company

Hakusensha, Inc.

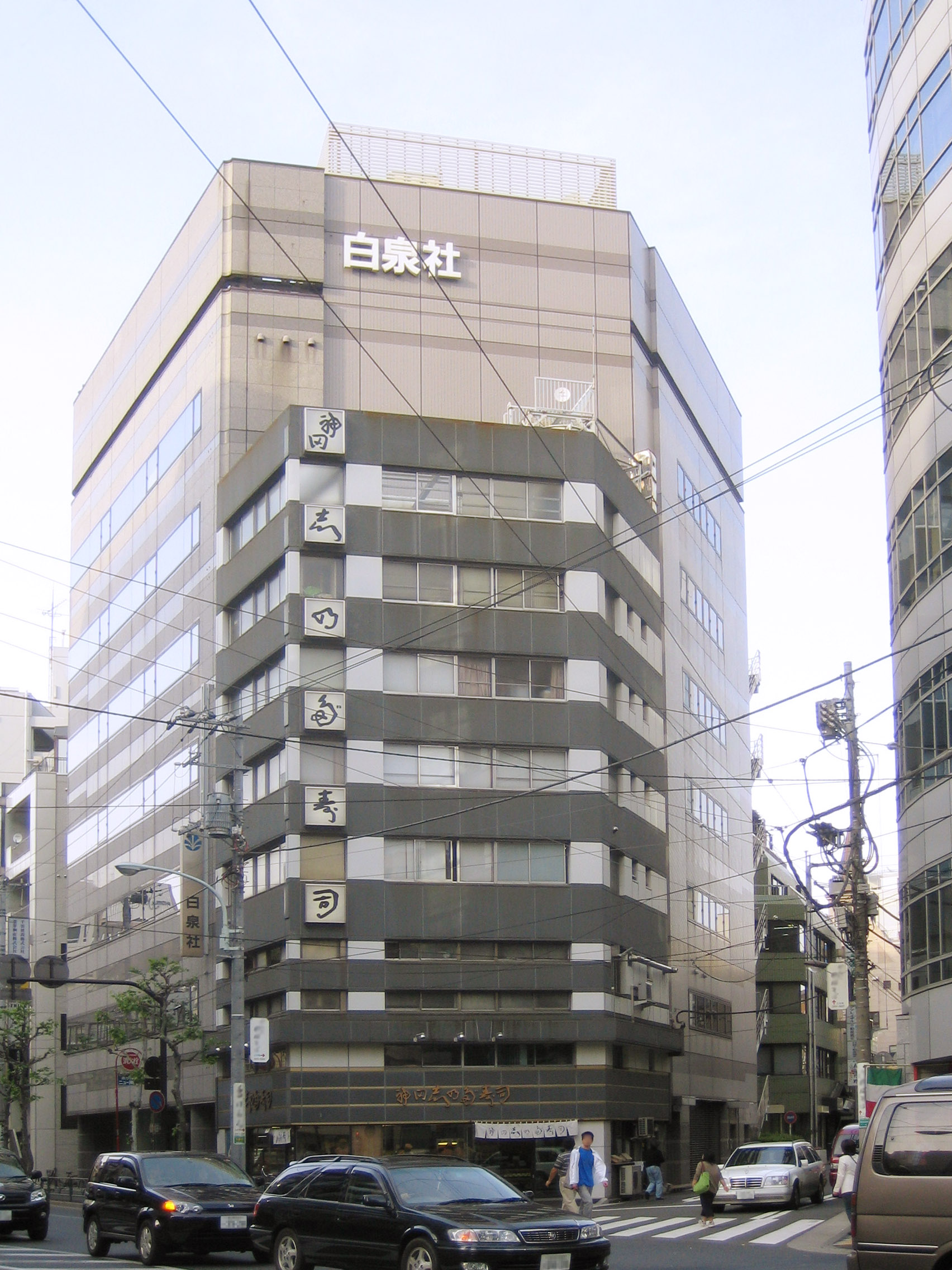
- Headquarters in Chiyoda, Tokyo
- Native name: 株式会社白泉社
- Romanized name: Kabushiki-gaisha Hakusensha
- Type: Private KK
- Industry: Publishing
- Genre: Magazines; Manga magazines; Picture books; Tankōbon
- Founded: December 1, 1973; 52 years ago in Tokyo, Japan
- Founder: Shueisha
- Headquarters: Awajichō, Chiyoda, Tokyo, Japan
- Key people: Hirofumi Sugawara (Representative director and president 2022–present); Kazuhiko Torishima (Advisor, past president and representative director 2015–2022)
- Number of employees: 113 (June 2023)
- Parent: Hitotsubashi Group
- Website: www.hakusensha.co.jp

Hakusensha, Inc. (Japanese: 株式会社白泉社, Hepburn: Kabushiki-gaisha Hakusensha) is a Japanese publishing company. It is headquartered in Chiyoda, Tokyo.

The company mainly publishes manga magazines and is involved in series' productions in their games, original video animation, music, and their animated TV series.

The company is part of the Hitotsubashi Group.

== History ==
Hakusensha was founded on December 1, 1973, by Shueisha. It is now a separate company although still a part of the Hitotsubashi Group with Shueisha and Shogakukan as one of the major members of the keiretsu.

After setting up the company for five months, the firm published their first magazine, a shōjo manga magazine titled Hana to Yume (花とゆめ). In November that year, they moved from Tōkyō-to, Chiyoda-ku, Kanda-Jinbōchō Ichi-chōme (東京都千代田区神田神保町1丁目) to Kanda-Jinbōchō San-chōme (神田神保町3丁目).

In 1975, the firm changed the frequency of their magazine from monthly to semi-monthly; in March, they created their first imprint, Hana to Yume Comics (花とゆめコミックス). In July 1976, they published their second manga magazine, a shōjo manga magazine named Hana to Yume LaLa (花とゆめ LaLa) as a sister magazine to Hana to Yume that is published bi-monthly. In April 1977, they set up a publication editing department and in July, they began publishing a seasonal magazine titled Bessatsu Hana to Yume (別冊花とゆめ).

In March 1981, they moved to Nishi-Kanda San-chōme (西神田3丁目). In September, they branched out from their usual shōjo manga magazines to a shōnen genre by publishing Shōnen Jets (少年ジェッツ). With that, the company released their series in Shōnen Jets under a new imprint, Jets Comics (ジェッツコミックス) in July 1982. As of January 2009, the magazine was defunct but the imprint is used to publish their seinen manga series serializing in Young Animal and Young Animal Arashi as well as certain series serializing in Melody.

Three years later on August, they published a new magazine, specialising under the josei genre, Silky that is published on even-numbered months. With that, they created an imprint for Silky's series to be published under Ladies' Comics (レディースコミックス). In March 1989, they started publishing a seinen manga magazine called Animal House. Three years after Animal House, they published Moe, a monthly magazine for picture books targeted toward shōjo readers. In May that year, Animal House was renamed to Young Animal and was then published semi-monthly since.

In March 1994, they created another imprint, Hakusensha Bunko (白泉社文庫). This imprint is for publishing manga in the bunkoban format. Moreover, in December 1995, they started publishing another magazine that was published seasonally, Shōsetsu HanaMaru (小説花丸) which is targeted toward josei readers.

In January 1996, they created an imprint for Shōsetsu HanaMaru (小説花丸), HanaMaru Comics (花丸コミックス). In July that year, they created HanaMaru Bunko (花丸文庫). In September, they published Melody which publishes on odd-numbered months. On the same month, they moved to Kanda-Awajichō Ni-chōme・Hakusensha Biru (神田淡路町2丁目・白泉社ビル), their present location.

In April 1996, they published LaLa DX on odd-numbered months. The company also began selling their drama CDs under Hakusensha CD Collection (白泉社CDコレクション), abbreviated as HCD.

In June 2001, they published Candy; as of January 2009, the magazine has been discontinued. In May 2005, they changed their special publication of Young Animal Arashi into a monthly publication. In July 2006, Bessatsu Hana to Yume was made a monthly publication. HanaMaru Black (花丸BLACK), a magazine targeted at readers of yaoi genre started its publication in May 2008.

Le Paradis, a manga anthology published triannually published its first issue on October 29, 2008.

=== Media mix ===
Besides publishing, the company releases drama CDs of series under its magazines: Hana to Yume Series (花とゆめシリーズ), Bessatsu Hana to Yume Series (別冊花とゆめシリーズ), LaLa Series (LaLaシリーズ), Young Animal Series (ヤングアニマルシリーズ) and HanaMaru Series (花丸シリーズ).

Moreover, it is involved in the productions of games, TV drama, theatrical movies, musicals, radio shows, TV animation and original video animation.

Series under the company can be read through mobile phones in Japan using the following service portals: Hakusensha e-Comics (白泉社e-コミックス) and Hakusensha HanaMaru Bunko (白泉社花丸文庫). Hakusensha e-Comics was started in September 2005 and is operated by Hakusensha and CharaWeb. This service is available in two variations and customers will have to pay 315 yen and 512 yen respectively to access this service every month.

=== Sony PlayStation Portable manga distribution service ===
It was announced at the 2009 Tokyo Game Show press conference that Hakusensha and 11 other publishing companies in Japan (such as Kodansha, Shueisha, Shogakukan, Square Enix, publishers associated with Kadokawa Shoten, Bandai Visual and Futabasha) would provide nearly 100 titles of manga to supply the service in PlayStation Store. Hakusensha has yet to provide details of the supplied titles for the service.

This service is only available for Japanese PlayStation Portable consoles and will start in December 2009.

== Publications ==
=== Manga magazines ===
- Hana to Yume
- Bessatsu Hana to Yume (defunct)
- The Hana to Yume
- Shonen Hana to Yume (defunct)
- LaLa
- LaLa DX
- Ane Lala (defunct)
- Shōnen Jets (defunct)
- Melody
- Silky
- Young Animal
- Young Animal Zero
- Young Animal Arashi (defunct)
- Young Animal Island
- HanaMaru Black
- Le Paradis

=== Other publications ===
- Shōsetsu HanaMaru
- Moe
- Kodomo Moe

=== Imprints ===
Hakusensha publishes their books and manga under these imprints.

- Hana to Yume Comics
- Young Animal Comics (formerly known as Jets Comics until June 2016)
- Hakusensha Ladies Comics
- HanaMaru Comics
- Hakusensha Bunko
- HanaMaru Bunko
- HanaMaru Novels
- HanaMaru Black

== Awards ==
Hakusensha organizes contests to offer aspiring manga artist a professional debut as well to be affiliated with its magazines.

These contests or awards are Hakusensha Athena Shinjin Taishō (白泉社アテナ新人大賞; Hakusensha Athena Newcomers' Awards), Hana to Yume Mangaka Course (HMC), LaLa Mangaka Scout Course (LMS), LaLa Manga Grand Prix (LMG), and Big Challenge Awards (BC).

== Radio show ==
There was a radio show hosted by voice actor Takehito Koyasu and Atsushi Kisaichi called Koyasu☆Kisaichi no HanaYume Check ni LaLa Shimasho (子安☆私市の花ゆめチックにLaLaしましょ) that was broadcast by Nippon Cultural Broadcasting. The show ended in March 2002. It was compiled into two CDs and is sold under Hakusensha's drama CD imprint, Hakusensha CD Collection (HCD).

== See also ==
- List of manga published by Hakusensha
