= Koshigoe Station =

Railway station in Kamakura, Kanagawa Prefecture, Japan

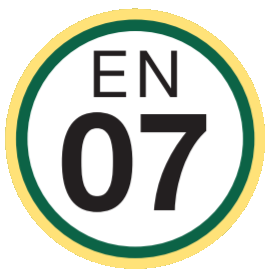
Koshigoe Station 腰越駅

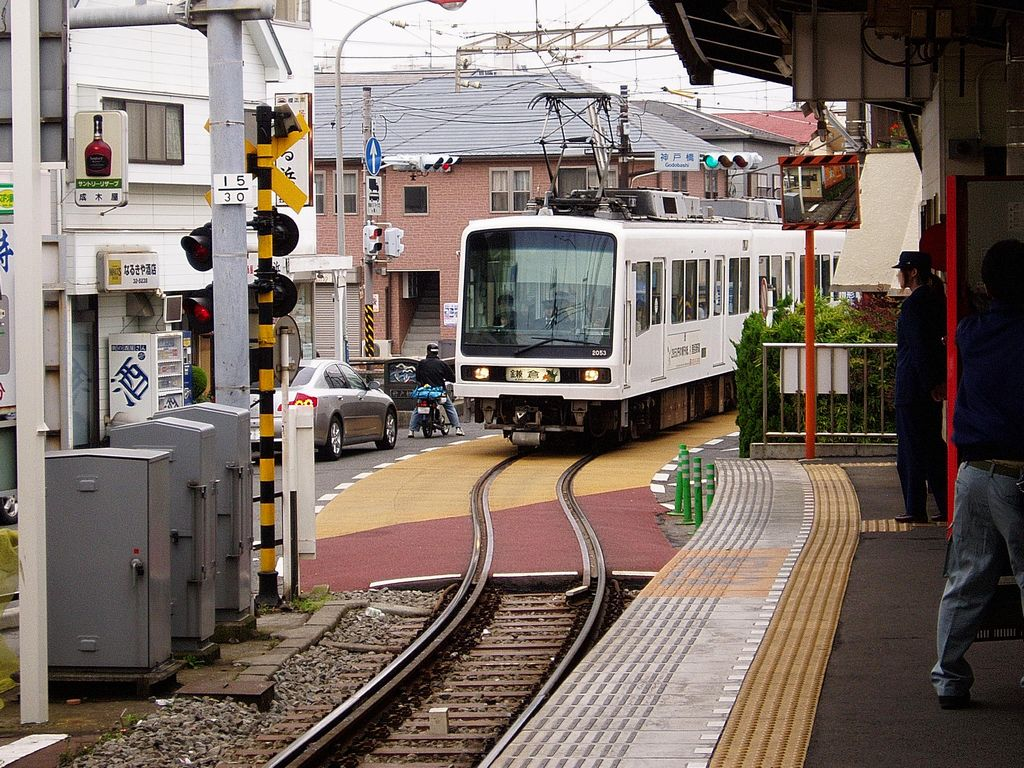
- Train entering Koshigoe Station from the street running section, May 2006

General information
- Location: Koshigoe 2-14-14; Kamakura; Japan
- Coordinates: 35°18′30″N 139°29′36″E
- Owner: Enoshima Electric Railway
- Distance: 3.9 km (2.4 mi) from Fujisawa
- Platforms: 1 side platform
- Tracks: 1

Construction
- Structure type: At-grade
- Accessible: Yes

Other information
- Status: Staffed (10:00–16:00)
- Station code: EN07

History
- Opened: 20 June 1903; 123 years ago
- Former names: Yato (until 1948)

Passengers
- FY2019: 2,945 daily

Services
Preceding station	Enoshima Electric Railway	Following station
Enoshima towards Fujisawa	Enoden	Kamakurakōkōmae towards Kamakura
Location
- Location within Kanagawa Prefecture Location within Japan

Koshigoe Station (Japanese: 腰越駅, Hepburn: Koshigoe-eki) is a railway station on the Enoshima Electric Railway (Enoden) located in the Koshigoe neighborhood of Kamakura, Japan.

== Service ==
Koshigoe Station is served by the Enoshima Electric Railway Main Line and is located 3.9 kilometers (2.4 mi) from the line's terminus at Fujisawa Station. Between this station and Enoshima, the Enoden trains are street running with tracks laid in the middle of a public roadway.

The station consists of a single side platform serving one track used for bi-directional traffic. The platform is long enough to accommodate only three cars; as a result, the doors of the rear car on Fujisawa-bound trains and the front car on Kamakura-bound trains do not open. The station is equipped with a restroom and is staffed during daytime hours from 10:00 to 16:00.

== History ==
Koshigoe Station was opened on 20 June 1903 as Yato Station (谷戸駅, Yato-eki). It was renamed to its present name on 15 July 1948. In 1993, the platform was lengthened to accept three-car trains.

Station numbering was introduced to the Enoshima Electric Railway January 2014 with Koshigoe being assigned station number EN07.

== Passenger statistics ==
In fiscal 2019, the station was used by an average of 2,945 passengers daily, making it the 9th used of the 15 Enoden stations

The average passenger figures for previous years (boarding passengers only) are as shown below.

Fiscal year	daily average
2005	1,336
2010	925
2015	2,103

== Surrounding area ==
- Manpuku-ji Temple
- Jyosen-ji Temple
- Koyurugi Shrine
- Koshigoe fishing port
