= Shojo =

Shojo may refer to:

- Shōjo (少女), the Japanese word for "young girl", often romanized as shojo or shoujo
- Shōjo manga, Japanese comics with a target demographic of young or teenage girls
- Shōjō (猩々 or 猩猩), a sea spirit with red hair and a fondness for alcohol in Japanese mythology
- Shōjō (猩々 or 猩猩), a less common Japanese word for orangutan
- Shojo (処女), the Japanese word for "female virgin"
- Shojō (書状), the Japanese word for letter (message)

== People with the surname ==
- Yuki Shoujou (正城 ユウキ; born 1980), Japanese mixed martial artist

== See also ==
- Shōjo Comic, a shōjo manga magazine published by Shogakukan since 1968
- Shōjō-ji, a Buddhist temple in Yugawa, Japan
- Shōnen (disambiguation), the Japanese word for "young boy" or "minor"
