= Mejiroyamashita Station =

Monorail station in Fujisawa, Kanagawa Prefecture, Japan

Mejiroyamashita 目白山下

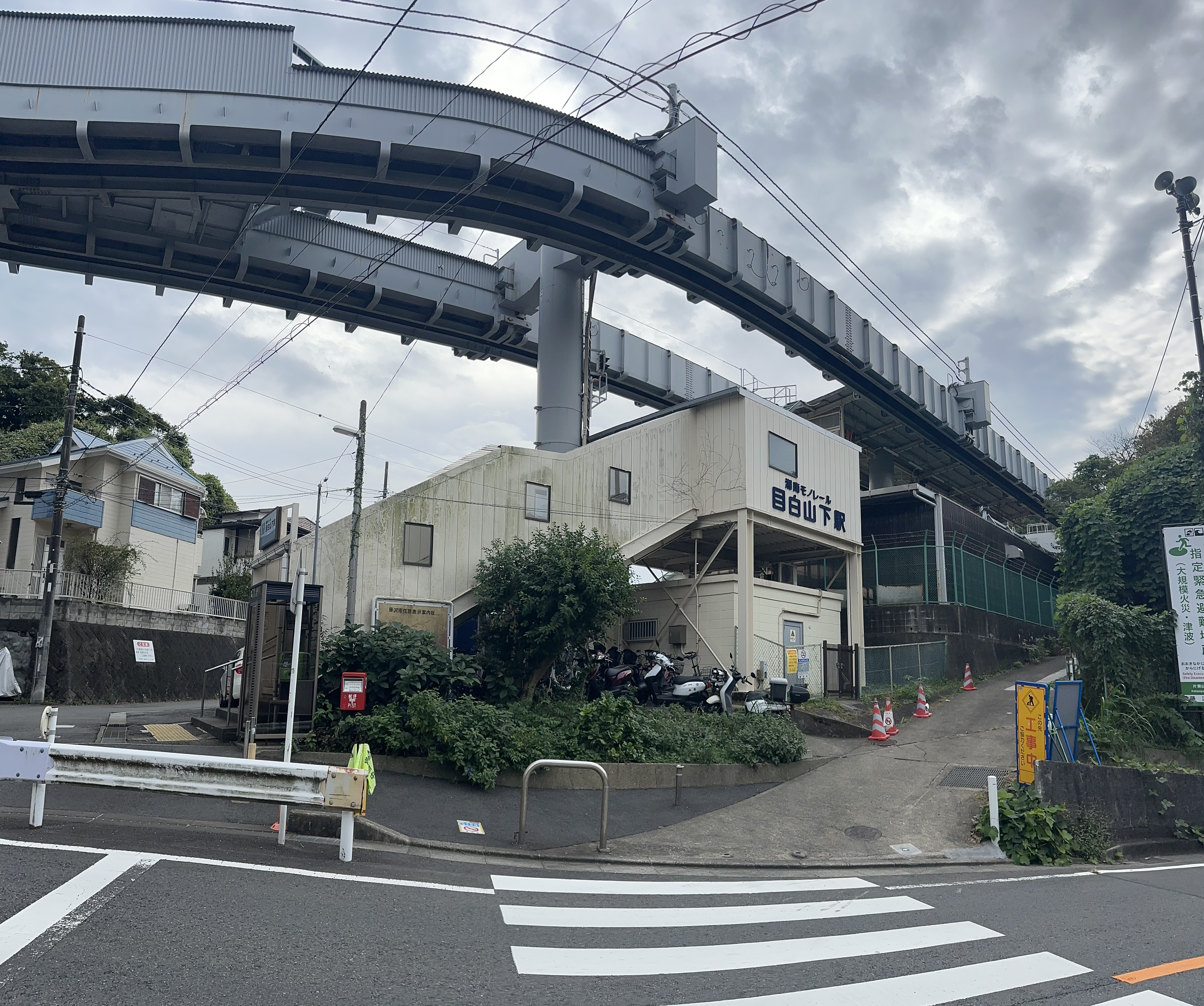
- Mejiroyamashita station, October 2023

General information
- Location: Katase 3-2776; Fujisawa, Kanagawa; Japan
- Coordinates: 35°18′50″N 139°29′28″E
- Operator: Shōnan Monorail Company
- Line: Enoshima Line
- Distance: 6.2 km (3.9 mi) from Ōfuna
- Platforms: 1 island platform
- Tracks: 2
- Connections: Enoden Bus

Construction
- Structure type: At-grade
- Accessible: No

Other information
- Station code: SMR7

History
- Opened: 1 July 1971

Services
Preceding station	Shonan Monorail	Following station
Shōnan-Enoshima Terminus	Enoshima Line	Kataseyama towards Ōfuna
Location

Mejiroyamashita station (Japanese: 目白山下駅, Hepburn: Mejiroyamashita-eki) is a monorail train station on the Shōnan Monorail Enoshima Line located in Fujisawa, Kanagawa Prefecture, Japan. It is located 6.2 kilometres (3.9 mi) from the northern terminal station at Ōfuna station.

== History ==
Mejiroyamashita station was opened on 1 July 1971 as part of the second phase of construction of the line, which extended its terminus to Shōnan-Enoshima Station.

== Station layout ==
Mejiroyamashita Station is located primarily at-grade station with single island platform serving two tracks. The station is unstaffed.
