= Enoshima Station =

Railway station in Fujisawa, Kanagawa Prefecture, Japan

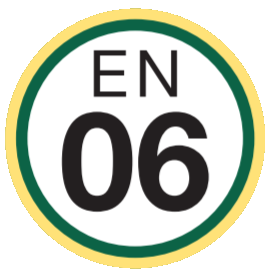
Enoshima Station 江ノ島駅

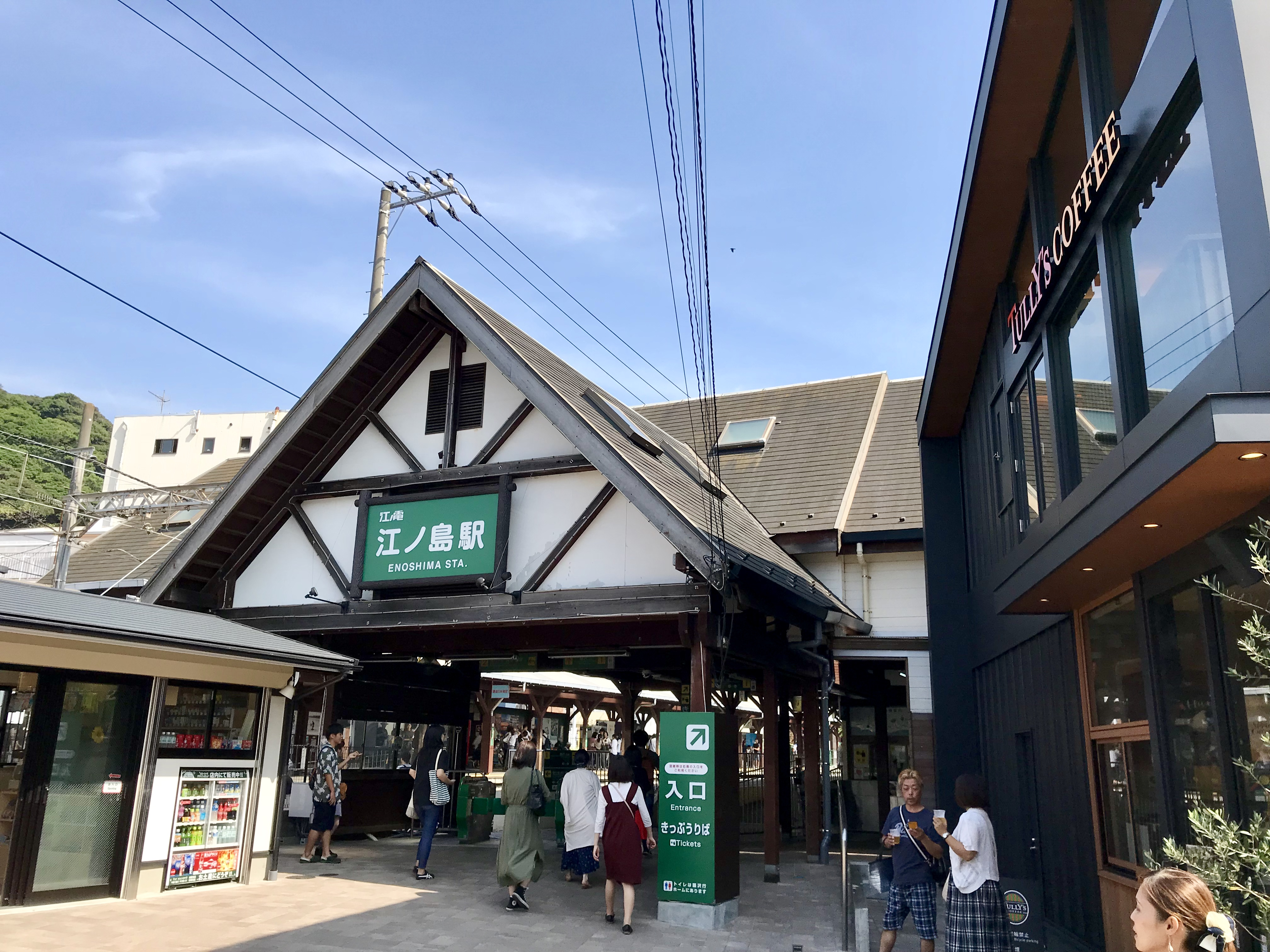
- Enoshima Station building in September 2018

General information
- Location: 1-4-7 Katase-Kaigan; Fujisawa; Japan
- Coordinates: 35°18′40″N 139°29′15″E
- Owner: Enoshima Electric Railway
- Distance: 3.3 km (2.1 mi) from Fujisawa
- Platforms: 2 side platforms
- Tracks: 2
- Connections: Odakyū Enoshima Line; Shonan Monorail; Bus stop

Construction
- Structure type: At-grade
- Accessible: Yes

Other information
- Status: Staffed (all day)
- Station code: EN06

History
- Opened: 1 September 1902; 123 years ago
- Rebuilt: 1999
- Former names: Katase (until 1929)

Passengers
- FY2019: 10,097 daily

Services
Preceding station	Enoshima Electric Railway	Following station
Shōnankaigankōen towards Fujisawa	Enoden	Koshigoe towards Kamakura
Location
- Location within Kanagawa Prefecture Location within Japan

Enoshima Station (Japanese: 江ノ島駅, Hepburn: Enoshima-eki) is a railway station on the Enoshima Electric Railway (Enoden) located in the city of Fujisawa, Japan. The station is the closest to the line's namesake, Enoshima island and is popular with tourists visiting the resort area.

== Service ==
Enoshima Station is served by the Enoshima Electric Railway Main Line and is located 3.3 km (2.1 mi) from the line's terminus at Fujisawa Station. Between this station and Koshigoe Station, the Enoden trains are street running with tracks laid in the middle of a public roadway. Immediately east of the station is the Enoshima Electric Railway headquarters, along with several train storage tracks.

The station consists of two opposed side platforms serving two ground-level tracks, with the platforms connected by a level crossing.

The Fujisawa-bound side of the station contains a staffed ticket office, coin lockers, a gift shop, and a Tully's Coffee outlet. Within the paid area, the station has a restroom and a waiting room. The station is staffed during all operating hours, with the ticket office open from 07:00 to 21:00.

== History ==
The station opened on 1 September 1902, as Katase Station (片瀬駅). It was renamed Enoshima Station in 1929. The current station building was rebuilt in 1999.

Station numbering was introduced to the Enoshima Electric Railway January 2014 with Enoshima being assigned station number EN06.

== Passenger statistics ==
In fiscal 2019, the station was used by an average of 10,097 passengers daily, making it the 3rd used of the 15 Enoden stations

The passenger figures for previous years are as shown below.

Fiscal year	Daily average
2005	6,231
2010	5,656
2015	7,345

== Surrounding area and transfer ==
- Katase-Enoshima Station (Odakyu Enoshima Line)
- Shonan-Enoshima Station (Shonan Monorail)
- Enoshima
- Enoshima Aquarium
- Katase Higashihama beach
- Katase Nishihama / Kugenuma Beach
- Shonan Shirayuri Gakuen Elementary School

== Popular culture ==
- This railway station was shown in the 5th episode of anime A Channel, where main characters were going to the sea by Enoshima Electric Railway Line Train, and were arguing about "it is train or tram".

== See also ==
- List of railway stations in Japan
