= Ōfuna Kannon =

Buddhist temple in Kamakura, Kanagawa, Japan

- 大船観音寺
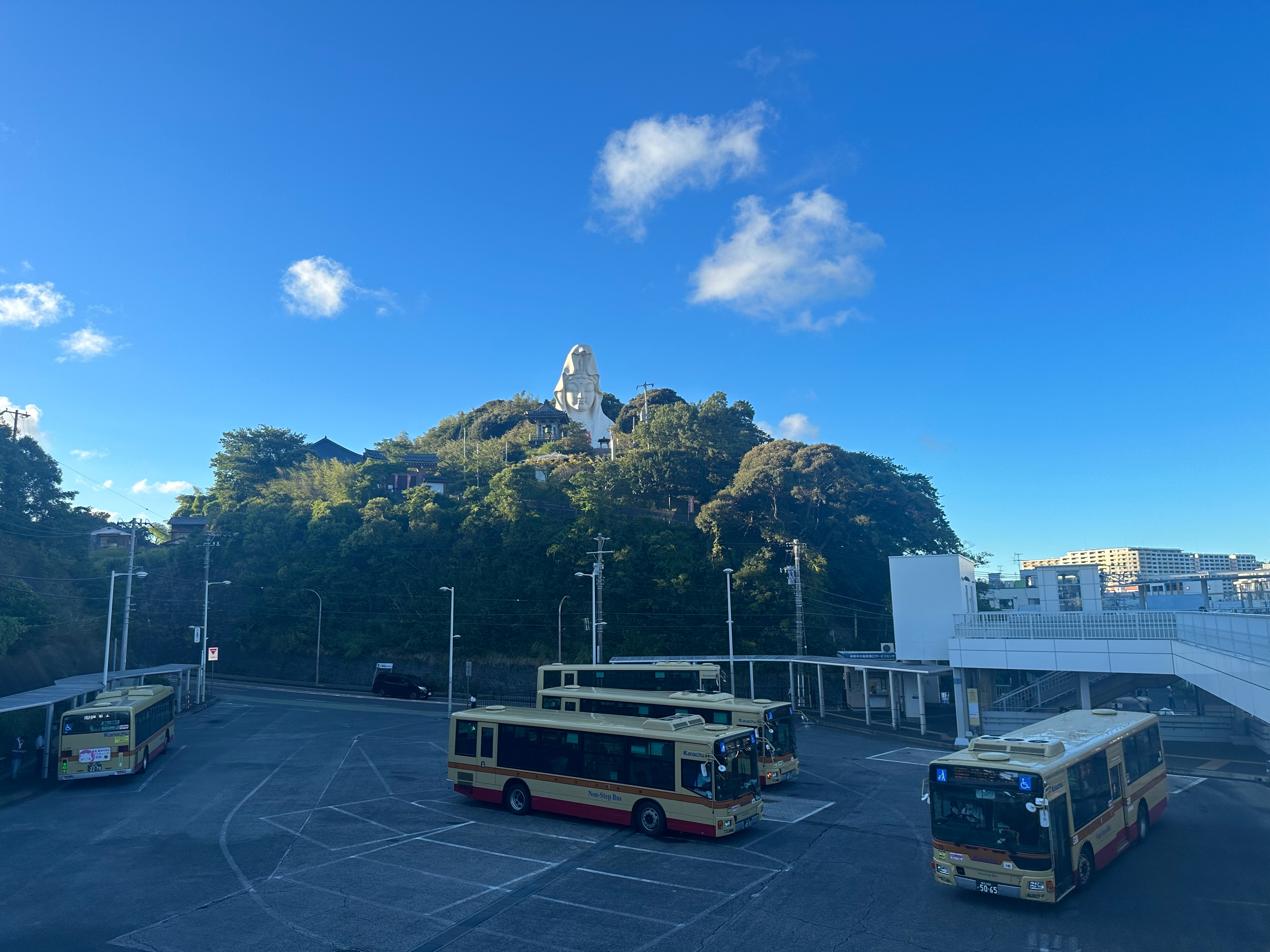
- Ōfuna Kannon

- Location within Japan

Religion
- Affiliation: Buddhist
- Prefecture: Kanagawa

Location
- Country: Japan
- Interactive map of Ōfuna Kannon
- Prefecture: Kanagawa
- Coordinates: 35°21′10.35″N 139°31′43.01″E

Architecture
- Groundbreaking: 1929
- Completed: 1960

Website
- The homepage of Ohfuna-Kannon-ji

Ōfuna Kannon Temple (大船観音寺, Ōfuna Kannonji) is a Buddhist temple in Kamakura, Kanagawa Prefecture, Japan. The statue stands at 25 meters/82 feet tall and weighs nearly 2,000 tons. It depicts the East Asian bodhisattva (a being that foregoes their nirvana in order to stay on Earth and help people) known as Guanyin or Kannon. Specifically, the Byakue (White-robed) Kannon, one of 33 forms of the Buddhist deity, said to prevent natural disasters, cure the sick, and assist women in childbirth. Ōfuna Kannon Temple (大船観音寺) is a Buddhist temple of the Sōtō school of Zen located in Ōfuna, northern Kamakura. Visitors heading to Kamakura will notice the most prominent feature of the Kannon-ji once their train approaches Ōfuna Station: the 25-metre tall snow-white statue of the bodhisattva Avalokiteśvara, known in Japan as Kannon (観音), the Goddess of Mercy.

== History ==
Construction of the Temple began in 1929 by the Sōtō school of Zen. The outline of the statue was complete by 1934 but work was suspended at the outbreak of the Pacific War. The Ofuna Kannon Society continued construction work in 1954 and the Temple was finally completed in 1960. The statue construction is that of sections of poured concrete and was performed entirely by hand. No concrete pump trucks were used. The surface of the statue is oft painted white. The statue itself contains a small museum and shrine and both are open for viewing.

The Kannon incorporates stones from ground zero of Hiroshima and Nagasaki to commemorate those who died in the explosions of the atomic bombs. A fire originating from the atomic fires of Hiroshima burns in a mushroom-formed statue.

This is from the documentation provided at the statue site:

The building of the statue of the "goddess of mercy of the white robe" at the Ofuna-Kannon-ji was organized "in general defense of the Fatherland" by Kentaro Kaneko and traditional nationalist Mitsuru Touyama, who had participated in the drafting of the Imperial Constitution. Originally praying for permanent world peace, the goddess of mercy belief spread and in 1929 the building of the statue began.

By 1934 the outline of the statue was complete, but the outbreak of war in the Pacific ended this steady progress, bringing extensive damage to the surrounding area and halting work on the statue for the next twenty years.

In 1954 the chief priest of the Soto sect of Zen, Zenji Rosen Takashina, the Minister of Education, Masazumi Andou, Minister of Justice, Ryouzou Makino, and Keita Goto all united in their support of the Ofuna-Kannon project. The Ofuna-Kannon Society was born and restoration of the statue started under the guidance of Yutaka Yamamoto, a professor at the Tokyo University of Arts. Construction was finally completed in 1960.

The Ofuna-Kannon Society was dissolved in 1981. Since then the site has been working as a temple under the direction of the Soji-ji, in Yokohama City. It contains stones carried from ground zero of Hiroshima and Nagasaki, which commemorate the souls of these who died as a result of the atomic bomb attacks

The Ofuna-kannon-ji is part of the Kamakura District, but due to its location it doesn't form part of the series temples and shrines that are popular amongst sightseers visiting Kamakura City. As a result, those who call at Ofuna-Kannon will find that over 60% of their fellow visitors are individuals with a critical belief who visit the temple on a regular basis for spiritual purposes.

Despite Asia's cultural diversity certain symbols and icons are visible throughout, providing common links between various nationalities. Kannon is such a symbol, and her statue at Ofuna provides a welcome sense of familiarity to foreigners living in

Japan who seek her out as a source of comfort during periods of solitude and homesickness. The goddess of mercy carries the prayers for peace of foreigners and Japanese citizens alike-the universality of this belief is celebrated every autumn in the Yume-Kannon festival. This festival is an opportunity for foreigners in Japan to show their belief in Kannon through song, dance, and traditional stalls. The celebrations take place in September, and all are invited to set up a stall, showcasing their vegetarian foods and other traditional items from their native country.

Thank you for visiting the temple today.

== Accessibility ==
Ōfuna Kannon is close to the Ōfuna Station and costs 300 yen to enter.

== See also ==
- List of tallest statues
