= Fujimichō Station (Kanagawa) =

Monorail station in Kamakura, Kanagawa Prefecture, Japan

Fujimichō 富士見町

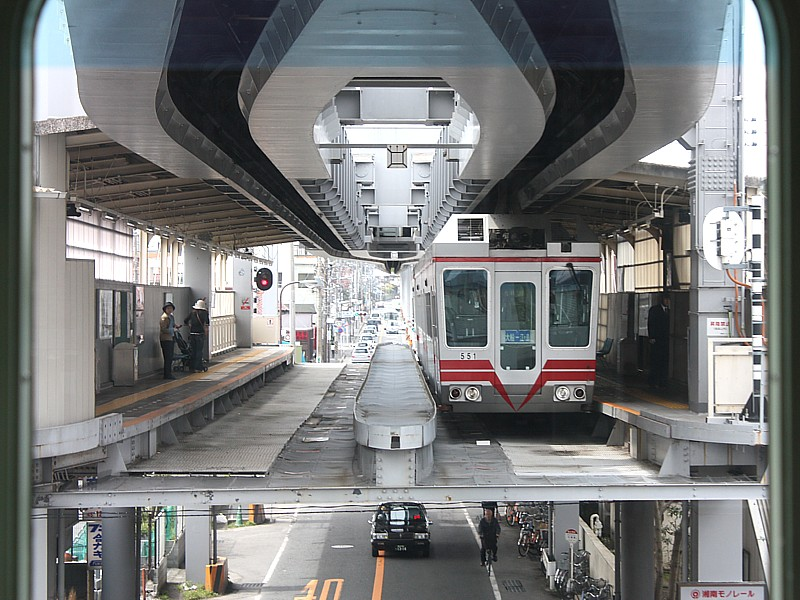
- Fujimichō Station

General information
- Location: Dai 2-19-17; Kamakura, Kanagawa; Japan
- Coordinates: 35°20′43.78″N 139°31′45.54″E
- Operator: Shōnan Monorail Company
- Line: Enoshima Line
- Distance: 0.9 km (0.56 mi) from Ōfuna
- Platforms: 2 side platforms
- Tracks: 2
- Connections: Enoden Bus

Construction
- Structure type: Elevated
- Accessible: Yes

Other information
- Station code: SMR2

History
- Opened: 7 March 1970

Services
Preceding station	Shonan Monorail	Following station
Shōnan-Machiya towards Shōnan-Enoshima	Enoshima Line	Ōfuna Terminus
Location

Fujimichō Station (Japanese: 富士見町駅, Hepburn: Fujimichō-eki) is a monorail train station on the Shōnan Monorail Enoshima Line located in Kamakura, Kanagawa Prefecture, Japan. It is located 0.9 kilometres (0.56 mi) from the northern terminus of the Shōnan Monorail Enoshima Line at Ōfuna Station.

== History ==
Fujimichō Station was opened on 7 March 1970 with the opening of the Enoshima Line between Ofuna and Nishi-Kamakura.

== Station layout ==
Fujimichō Station is an elevated station with dual opposed side platforms serving two tracks. The platforms have independent exits, and there is no interconnection between platforms. The station is unattended.
