= Gekkan Shōnen Jets =

Japanese manga magazine

- Issue #1 (Oct 1981) of Gekkan Shōnen Jets
- Categories: Shōnen manga
- Frequency: Monthly
- First issue: 1981
- Final issue: 1983
- Company: Hakusensha
- Country: Japan
- Based in: Tokyo
- Language: Japanese

Gekkan Shōnen Jets (月刊少年ジェッツ) was a monthly Japanese shōnen manga magazine published by Hakusensha. Its first issue, the October 1981 issue, was released in September 1981. The magazine ceased publication after the release of its March 1983 issue.

== Overview ==
Hakusensha, which had been primarily known for girls' manga, launched this boys' manga magazine in September 1981 (October issue) as its first magazine for men. Initially, it focused on sports-themed stories, and the layout of the magazine emphasized that it was a boys' comic magazine.

It ceased publication in 1983 (February issue) and was relaunched as Monthly Comicomi .

The name "Jets" remained as the label name until June 2016.
