= Shōnen Sunday (disambiguation) =

Shōnen Sunday (少年サンデー) can refer to the following magazines published in Japan by Shogakukan:

- Bessatsu Shōnen Sunday, a former monthly magazine
- Monthly Shōnen Sunday, a manga magazine published since June 2009
- Shōnen Sunday Super, a manga magazine published bimonthly since 1978
- Weekly Shōnen Sunday, a manga magazine published since 1959
- Shonen Sunday, a publishing label of Viz Media for series originally published in Weekly Shōnen Sunday
