= Mejiro-no-Mori =

Public wooded area in Toshima, Tokyo, Japan

Coordinates: 35.7230897°N 139.6988132°E

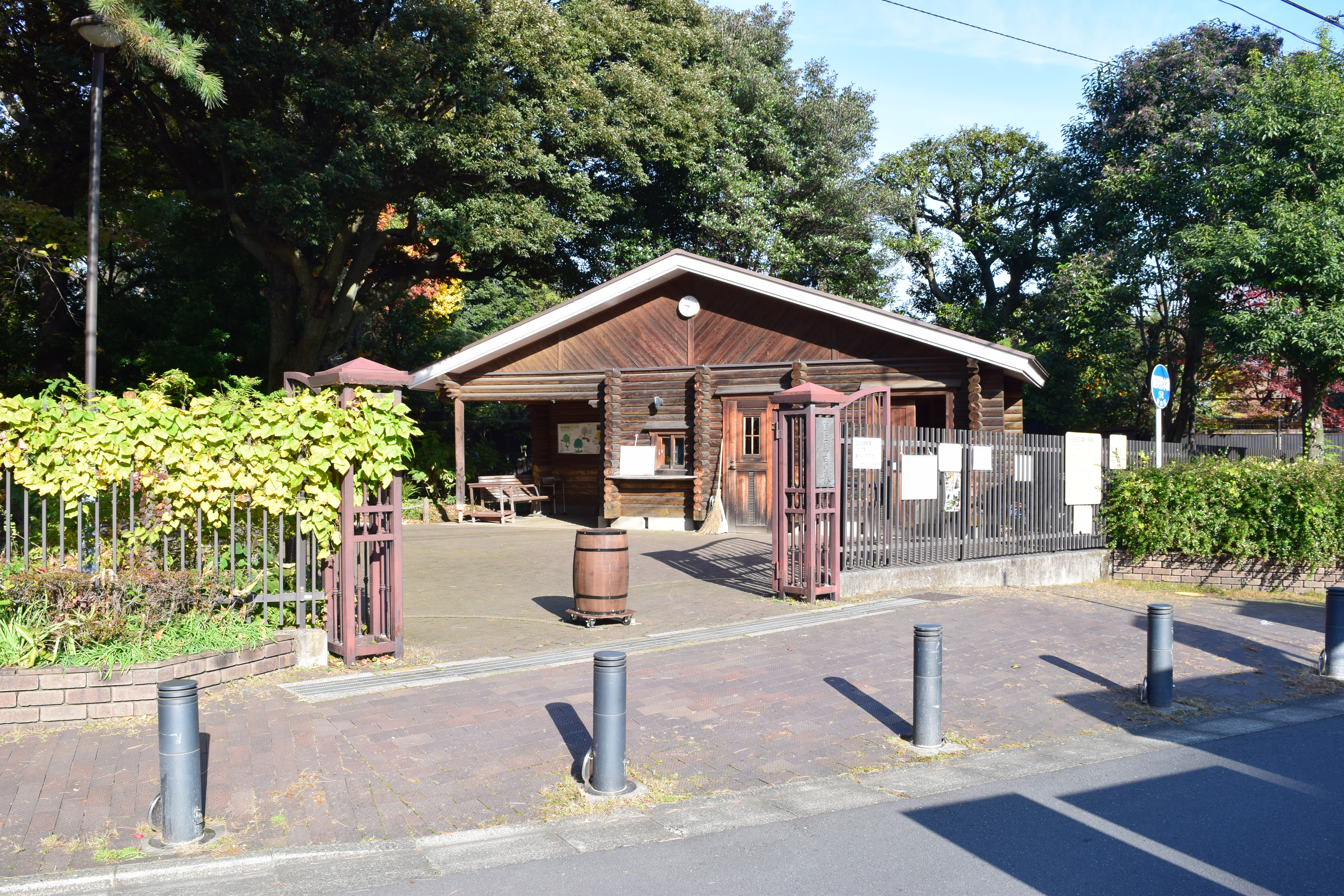
- The east entrance

- Location within Special wards of Tokyo Location within Tokyo Location within Japan
- Location: Toshima Ward, Tokyo, Japan
- Area: 3,201 square metres (0.791 acres)
- Created: April 1997
- Public transit: Shiinamachi Station

Mejiro-no-Mori (目白の森, Mejiro-no-Mori) is a public wooded area in Toshima Ward, Tokyo, Japan. Officially, it is not a public park, but a "forest for the residents of the ward" (区民の森 (Kumin-no-Mori)) as designated by Toshima Ward. It is open throughout the year.

== Facilities ==
Mejiro-no-Mori mainly consists of a small wooded area, but there are also benches, a log house (information center), a toilet with wheelchair access, a small pond (called Tonbo Ike (Dragonfly Pond)) and a sculpture.

== Attractions ==
Various bird species can be found in Mejiro-no-Mori, including Japanese tit (Parus minor), brown-eared bulbul (Hypsipetes amaurotis) and Japanese bush warbler (Horornis diphone). Also, freshwater crayfish (Procambarus clarkii) and dragonflies can be found in the pond. The trees and plants include crape myrtle (Lagerstroemia indica), Itajii Chinkapin (Castanopsis sieboldii), Chinese soapberry (Sapindus mukorossi) and the mochi tree (Ilex integra).

== Gallery ==
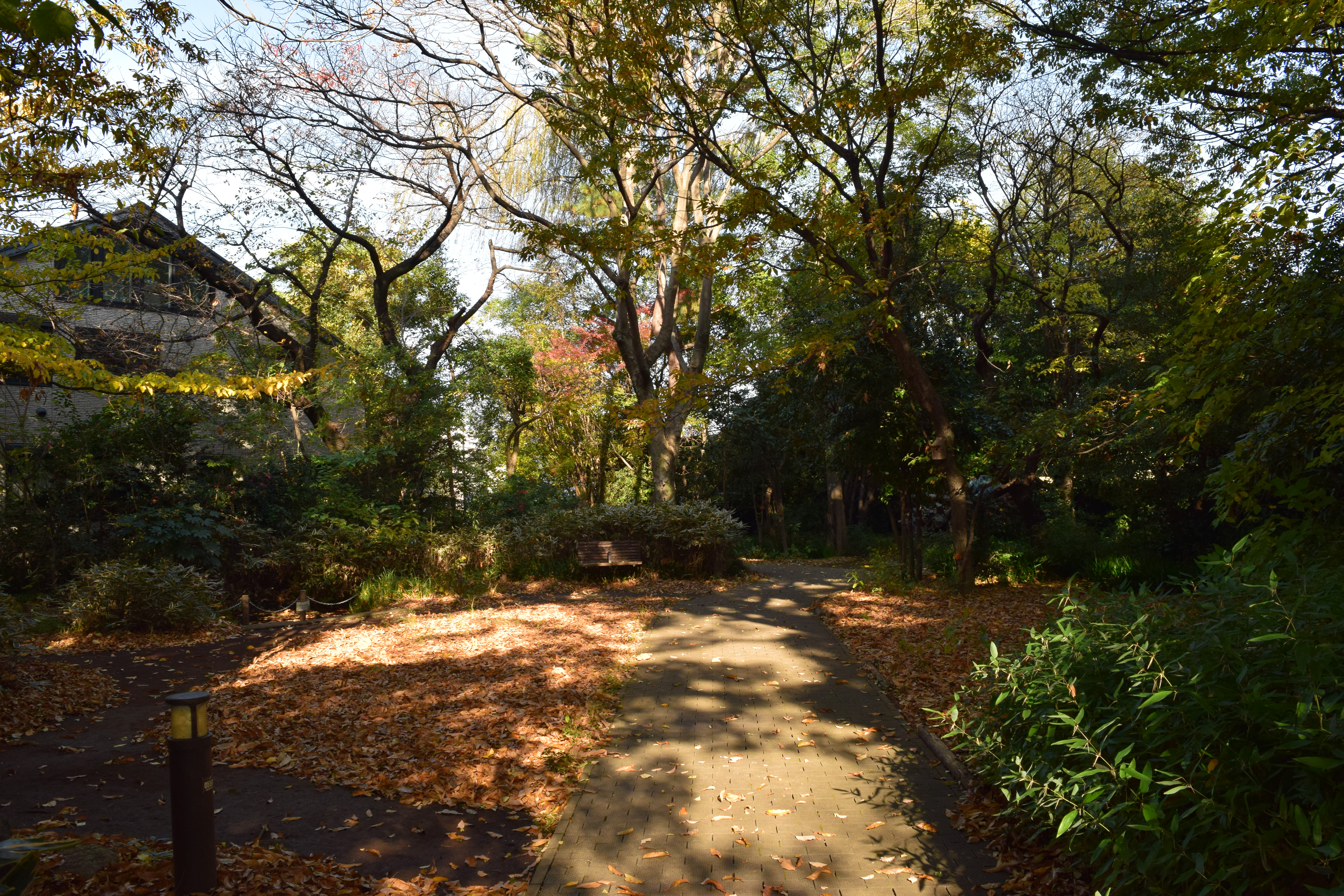
Open area in Mejiro-no-Mori

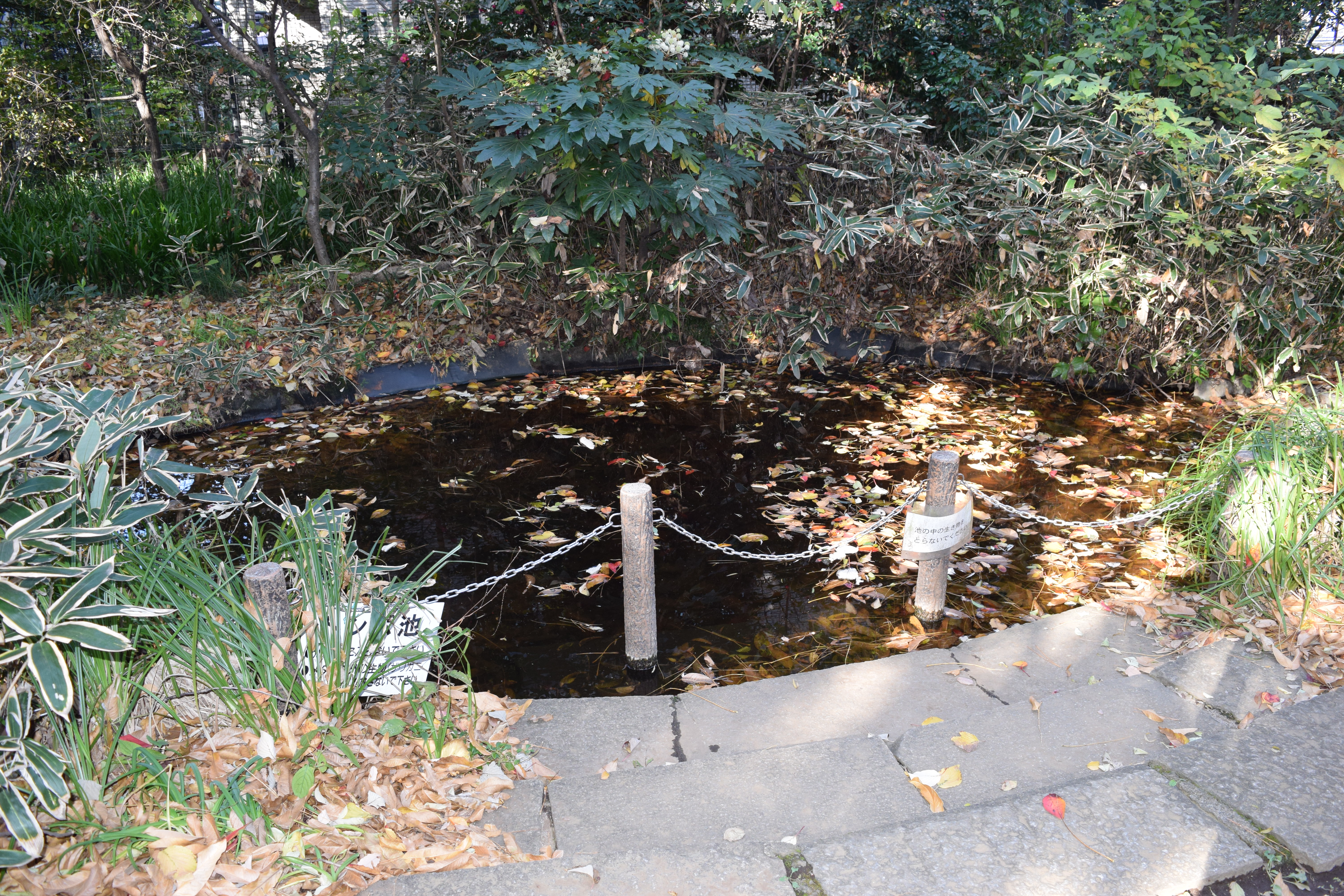
Small pond in Mejiro-no-Mori

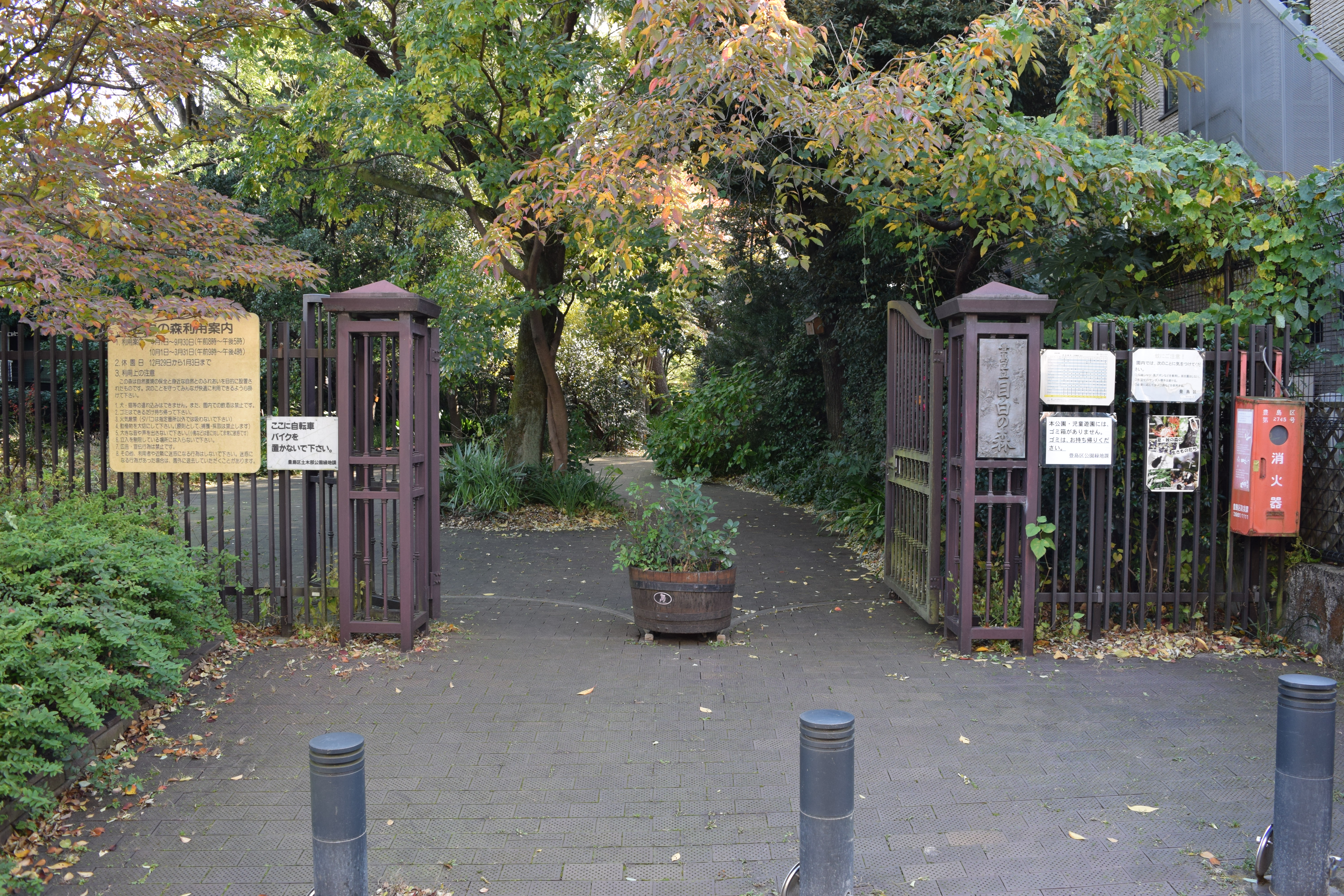
West entrance

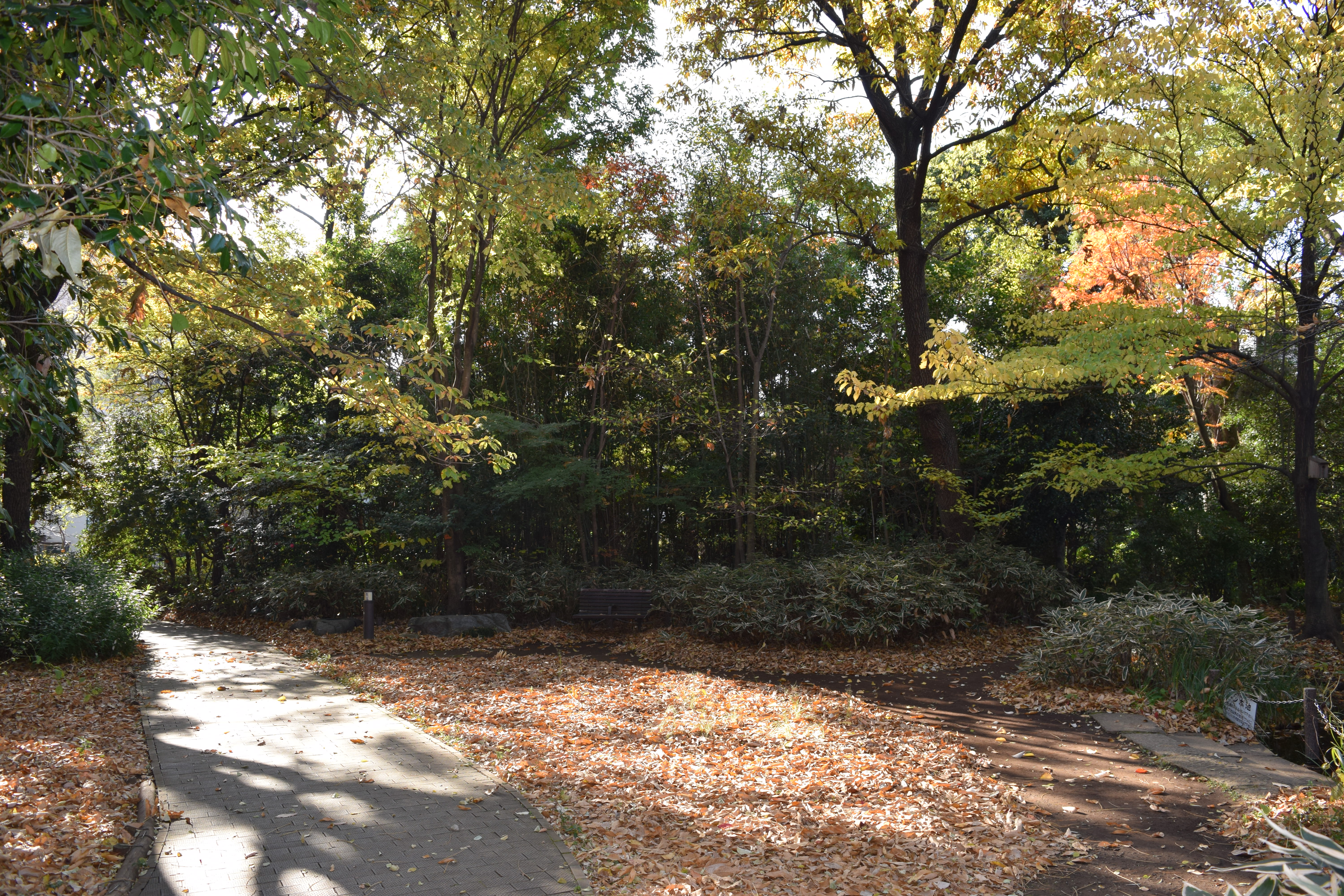
Trees in Mejiro-no-Mori

== See also ==
- Parks and gardens in Tokyo
- National Parks of Japan
