= Shonan Monorail =

Suspended monorail in Kanagawa, Japan

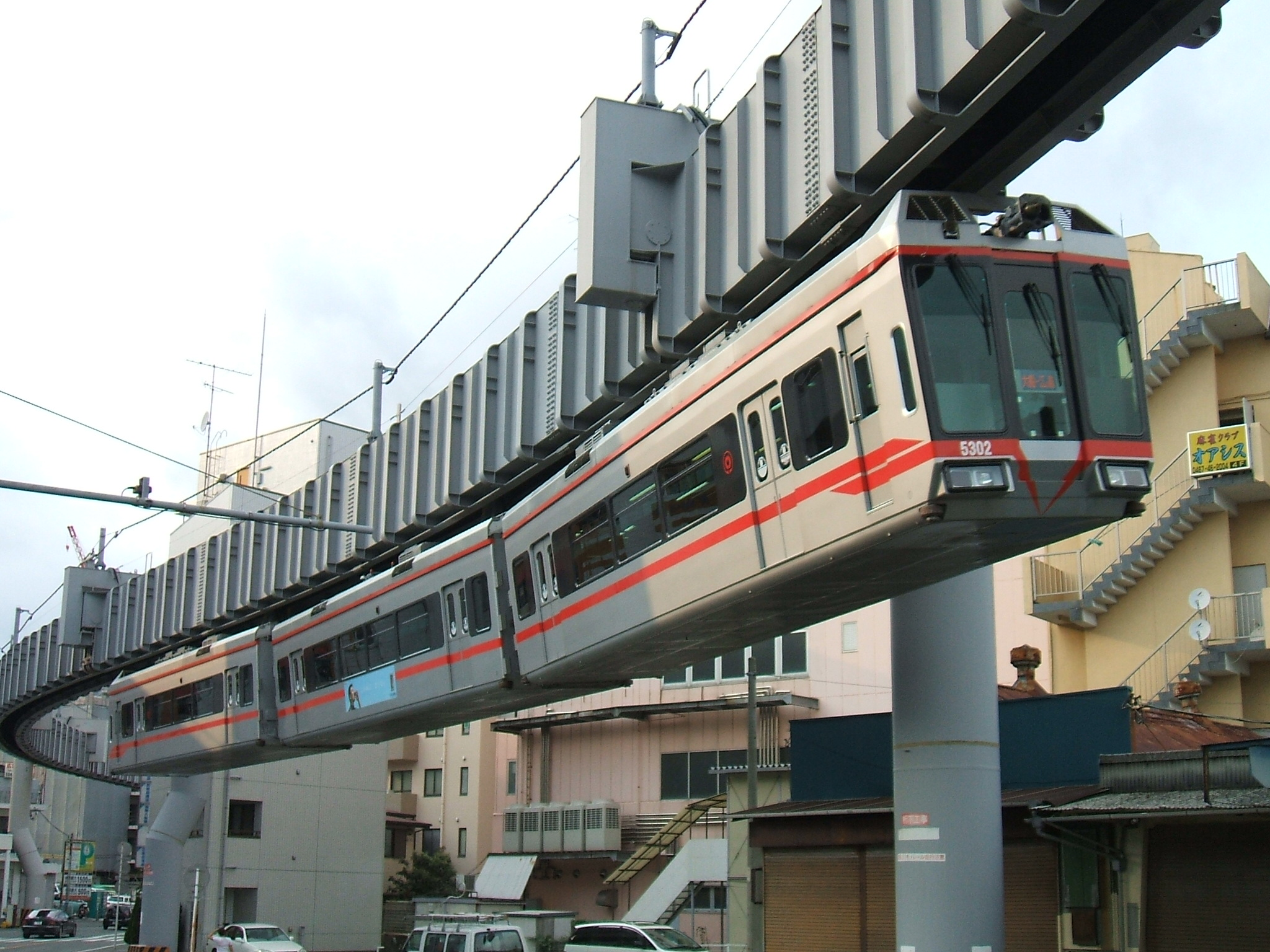
- A 5000 series train in August 2008

Overview
- Locale: Kanagawa Prefecture
- Transit type: Suspension monorail (SAFEGE-type)
- Number of stations: 8
- Daily ridership: 29,814 (JFY23)
- Website: kamakura-enoshima-monorail.jp

Operation
- Began operation: 7 March 1970; 56 years ago
- Operators: Shonan Monorail Co., Ltd., a subsidiary of Michinori Holdings
- Rolling stock: 5000 series
- Number of vehicles: 7
- Train length: 3 cars
- Headway: 7 minutes

Technical
- System length: 6.6 km (4.1 mi)
- No. of tracks: 1, passing loops at stations
- Minimum radius of curvature: Main line: 90 m (300 ft); At stations: 50 m (160 ft)
- Electrification: Contact rails, 1,500 V DC
- Top speed: 75 km/h (47 mph)
System map

The Shonan Monorail (Note: Japanese: 湘南モノレール, Hepburn: Shōnan Monorēru) is a suspended, SAFEGE-type monorail in the cities of Kamakura and Fujisawa in Kanagawa Prefecture, Japan. It is operated by the Shonan Monorail Co., Ltd. (Note: 湘南モノレール株式会社, Shōnan Monorēru Kabushiki-gaisha) which is a subsidiary of Michinori Holdings. The line opened on 7 March 1970, the first suspended monorail in Japan. Trains run on a 6.6-kilometre (4.1 mi) line called the Enoshima Line. It is a mostly single-track railway with passing loops at most stations. The line is used by locals commuting to jobs in Tokyo or Yokohama and by tourists visiting the resort area of Enoshima.

== History ==
Inside and outside a train near Kataseyama Station, 2021

During the 1960s, several monorail systems were tested across Japan. The Shonan Monorail was developed as a demonstration line for Mitsubishi Heavy Industries' suspended-type monorail system, which competed with Hitachi’s straddle-beam design. The project built upon data collected from the Higashiyama Park Monorail, a short suspended test line that operated within the Higashiyama Zoo and Botanical Gardens in Nagoya from 1964 to 1974. The route between Ōfuna station and the resort area of Enoshima was selected for its steep gradients and sharp curves, which could showcase suspended system’s performance. Mitsubishi also had an interest in the area, as the line could serve its nearby manufacturing plants and offices.

Construction utilized the combined resources of the Mitsubishi Group: the track and support towers were produced at the company's Yokohama Shipyard, rolling stock at its Mihara Machinery Works, electrical equipment by Mitsubishi Electric, and overall coordination by Mitsubishi Estate. The Shonan Monorail Company was established as a joint venture between Mitsubishi, the Keihin Kyuko Electric Railway (which owned the right of way), and Seibu Railway (which controlled the land surrounding Kataseyama Station).

The company applied for a construction license on 6 October 1965, which was approved later that month. The line was built above the former Keihin Kyuko Expressway, Japan’s first automobile-only road. Originally intended to host a conventional train from the Keihin Kyuko Electric Railway, the corridor was repurposed as a toll road and later transferred to the cities of Kamakura and Fujisawa. The route includes steep grades and tight curves—up to an 8.8% gradient and 25-metre (82 ft) minimum radius along the road. To balance performance and passenger comfort, the monorail’s design limited the gradient to 7.4%, and set a minimum curve radius of 100 metres (330 ft) on the main line, except for a single 90-metre (300 ft) curve near Ōfuna Station and 50-metre (160 ft) curves in station areas. Two tunnels were also constructed along the route: the 451-metre (1,480 ft) Kamakurayama Tunnel, which has a straight alignment where trains reach their top speed of 75 kilometres per hour (47 mph) and allows trains to bypass the steepest grades of the Keihin Kyuko Expressway; and the 205-metre (673 ft) Kataseyama Tunnel near the southern terminus. The line’s undulating profile has been compared to a roller coaster.

Construction on the first section between Ōfuna and Nishi-Kamakura began in 1967 and it opened on 7 March 1970 with two-car 300 series trains, followed by the extension to Shōnan-Enoshima on 1 July 1971. Due to growing ridership, three-car trains were introduced on 30 January 1975.

On 20 February 1990, a train collided with an aerial lift vehicle beneath the track near Kataseyama, seriously injuring the train operator but causing no passenger fatalities. Another incident occurred on 24 February 2008, when a train overran Nishi-Kamakura station due to a brake malfunction; no injuries occurred, and service resumed after safety modifications were made. Another collision with an aerial lift vehicle occurred on 7 November 2008, also without injuries.

In May 2015, majority ownership of the Shonan Monorail transferred from the Mitsubishi Group to Michinori Holdings. In 2018, the line began accepting IC fare cards such as Pasmo and Suica, and was twinned with Germany’s Wuppertal Schwebebahn, another suspended monorail and a popular tourist attraction.

== Stations ==
The Shonan Monorail Enoshima Line (江の島線, Enoshima-sen) travels 6.6 kilometres (4.1 mi) every seven to eight minutes between Ōfuna Station and Enoshima, making six stops. The average length of a single trip is 14 minutes. The line includes two tunnels (between Shōnan-Fukasawa and Nishi-Kamakura stations, and between Mejiroyamashita and Shōnan-Enoshima stations). The line's maintenance workshop is located at the Shonan Monorail Headquarters in Kamakura City.

Trains can pass each other at stations marked "◇"; they cannot pass at stations marked "|".

No.	Station	Distance in km (mi)		Transfers	Track layout	Location
No.	Station	Between stations	Total	Transfers	Track layout	Location
	Ōfuna 大船	—N/a	0 (0)	Tokaido Main Line (JT07); Negishi Line (JK01); Yokosuka Line (JO09); Shonan-Shinjuku Line (JS09)	|	Kamakura
	Fujimichō 富士見町	0.9 (0.56)	0.9 (0.56)		◇	Kamakura
	Shōnan-Machiya 湘南町屋	1.1 (0.68)	2.0 (1.2)		|	Kamakura
	Shōnan-Fukasawa 湘南深沢	0.6 (0.37)	2.6 (1.6)		◇	Kamakura
	Nishi-Kamakura 西鎌倉	2.1 (1.3)	4.7 (2.9)		◇	Kamakura
	Kataseyama 片瀬山	0.8 (0.50)	5.5 (3.4)		|	Kamakura
	Mejiroyamashita 目白山下	0.7 (0.43)	6.2 (3.9)		◇	Fujisawa
	Shōnan-Enoshima 湘南江の島	0.4 (0.25)	6.6 (4.1)	Enoshima Electric Railway (Enoshima: EN06); Odakyu Enoshima Line (Katase-Enoshima: OE16)	|	Fujisawa

== Rolling stock ==
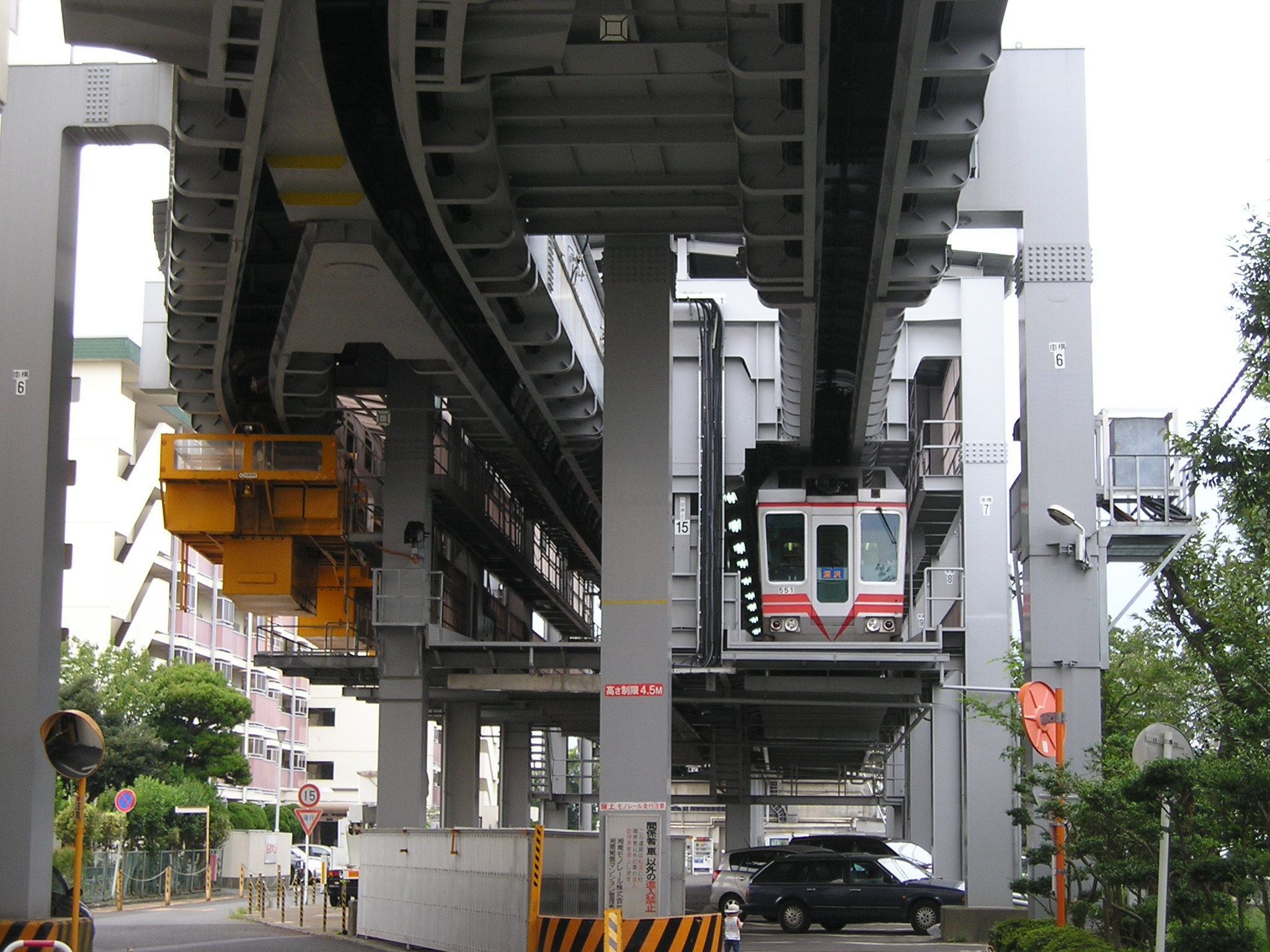
A Shonan Monorail train at the depot near Shonan-Fukasawa station. A track switch can be seen at upper left. Also visible on the left are maintenance vehicles.

Since 2004, the line has been operated using a fleet of seven three-car aluminium-bodied 5000 series trainsets. The 5000 series is equipped with a variable voltage variable frequency (VVVF) AC motor drive system, which controls speed and torque by varying the input electricity. Compared to prior DC motor drive systems, VVVF allows for regenerative braking, smooth acceleration and deceleration, and requires fewer inspections and less maintenance because, unlike a DC motor, it has no commutator brush or contact switch.

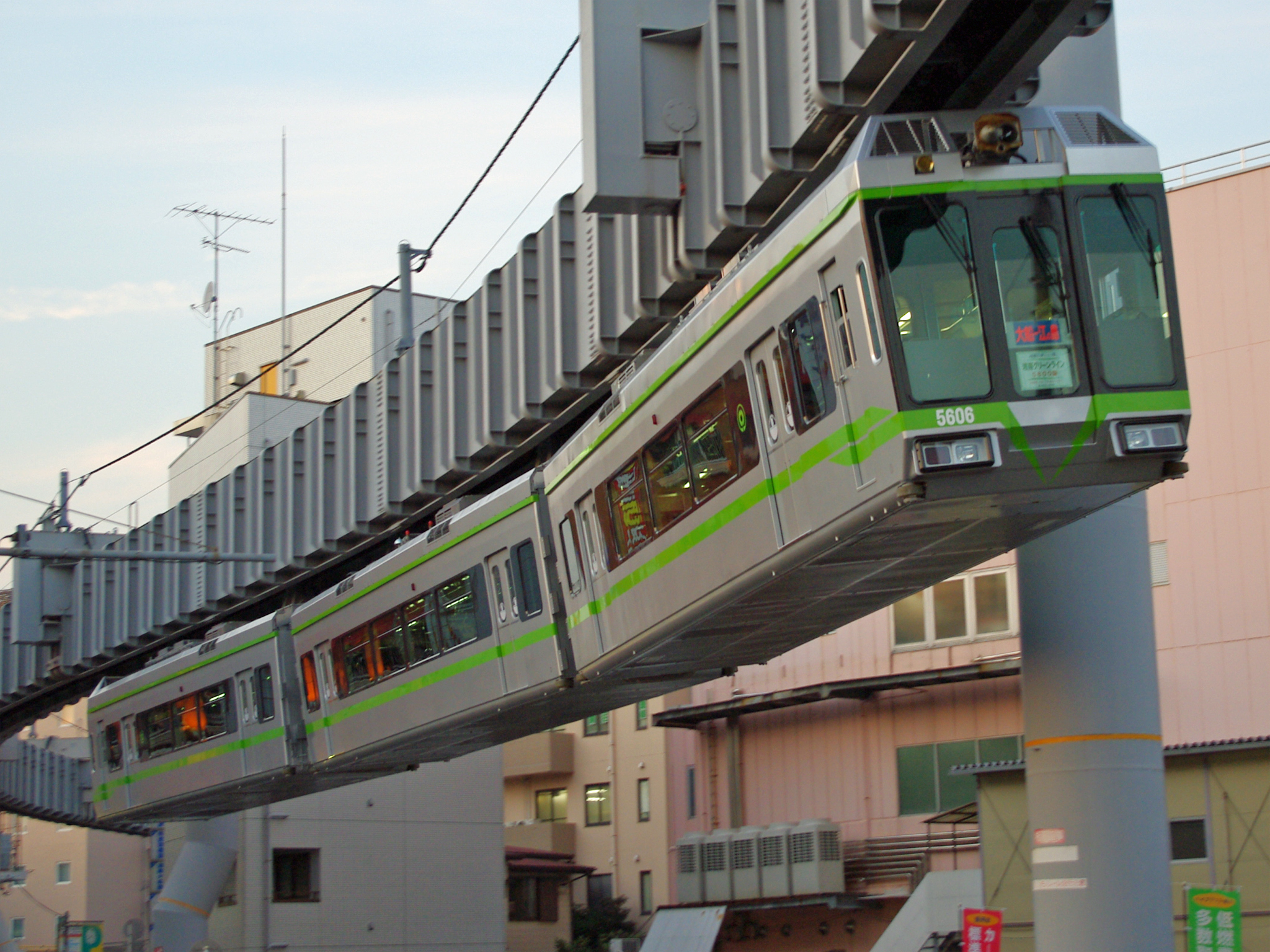
A 5000 series set in October 2009

=== Former ===
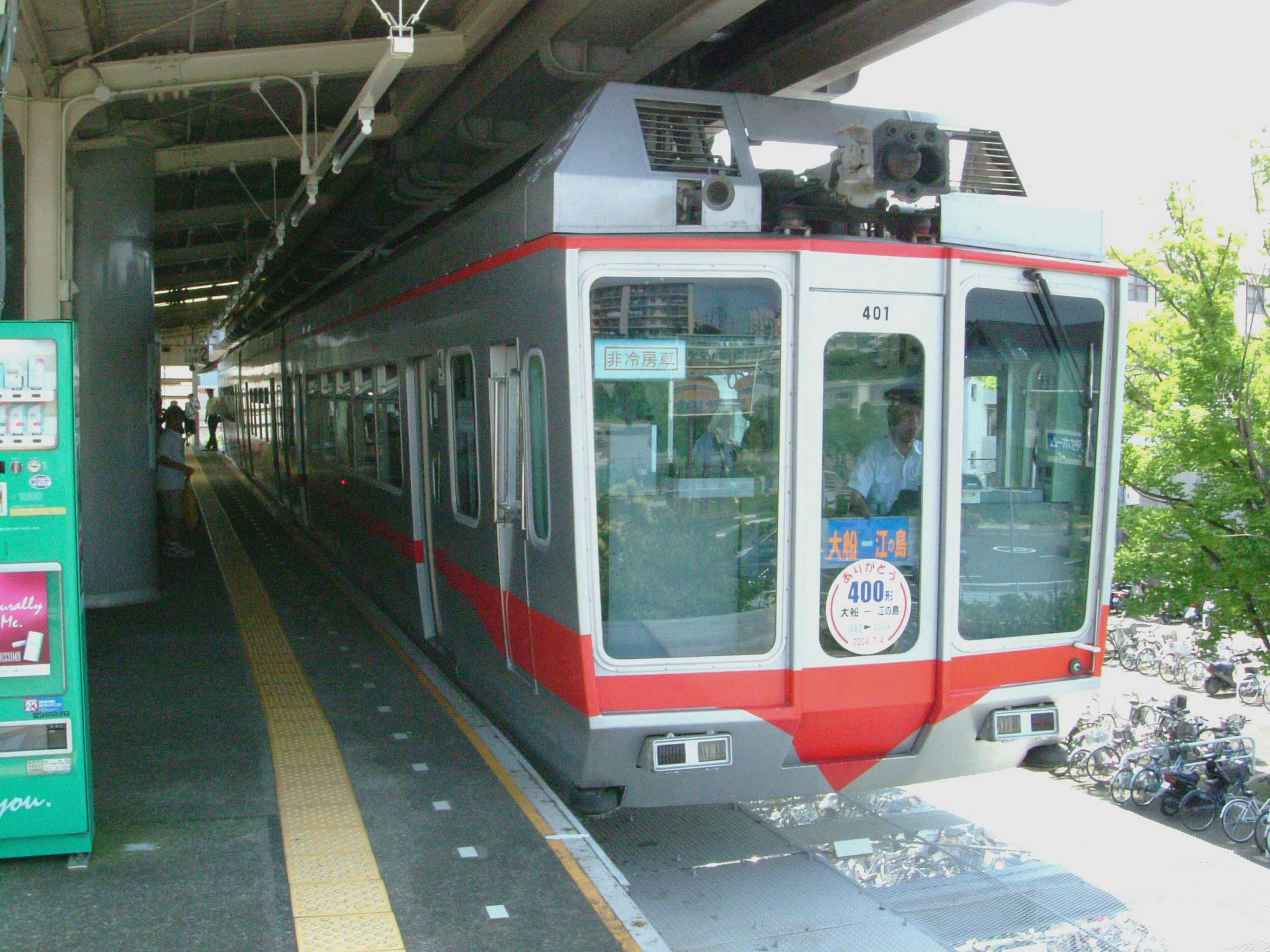
A 400 series set in 2004

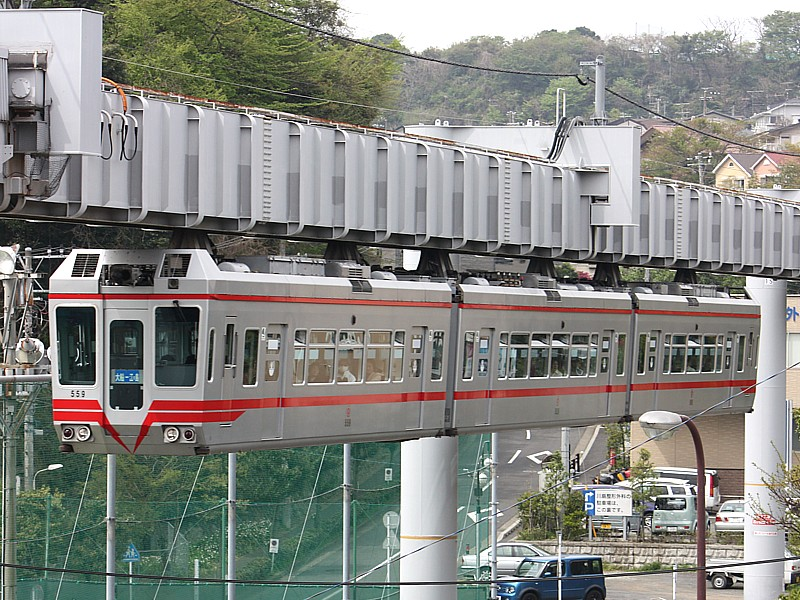
A 500 series set in April 2008

Services were initially operated using a fleet of six two-car 300 series trainsets built by Mitsubishi Heavy Industries. Two sets were increased to three cars from February 1975 to provide additional capacity. The last of the 300 series sets were withdrawn by July 1992, following the introduction of new 500 series trains.

The three-car 400 series trains were introduced in 1980 and operated until July 2004.

The 500 series trains, introduced in 1988, were the first air-conditioned trains on the line. The last 500 series train was withdrawn from service on 26 June 2016.

== See also ==
- Monorails in Japan
- List of rapid transit systems
