= Shōnan-Enoshima Station =

Monorail station in Fujisawa, Kanagawa Prefecture, Japan

Shōnan-Enoshima 湘南江の島

- Shōnan-Enoshima station, March 2026

General information
- Location: Katase 3-15-1; Fujisawa, Kanagawa; Japan
- Coordinates: 35°18′42″N 139°29′16″E
- Operator: Shōnan Monorail Company
- Line: Enoshima Line
- Distance: 6.6 km (4.1 mi) from Ōfuna
- Platforms: Bay platform
- Tracks: 1
- Connections: Enoshima Electric Railway; Odakyu Enoshima Line; Enoden Bus

Construction
- Structure type: Elevated
- Accessible: Yes

Other information
- Station code: SMR8

History
- Opened: 1 July 1971

Services
Preceding station	Shonan Monorail	Following station
Terminus	Enoshima Line	Mejiroyamashita towards Ōfuna
Location

Shōnan-Enoshima station (Japanese: 湘南江の島駅, Hepburn: Shōnan-Enoshima-eki) is the southern terminal station of the Shōnan Monorail, located in Fujisawa, Kanagawa Prefecture, Japan. It is located 6.6 kilometres (4.1 mi) from the northern terminus at Ōfuna Station.

== History ==
Shōnan-Enoshima station was opened on 1 July 1971 as part of the second phase of construction of the line, which extended its terminus from Nishi-Kamakura Station.

Renovation works on the station took place between July and December 2018. Along with a refreshed exterior, new escalators and elevators were built to connect the ground floor with the fifth floor, where the monorail departs from. An open terrace at the top of the building provides an overlook of the area, with Sagami Bay and Mt. Fuji visible on a clear day.

== Station layout ==
Shōnan-Enoshima station is an elevated station with single bay platform serving one track for bi-directional traffic. The platform is located on the top floor of a five-story station building.

== Surrounding area and transfer ==
- Enoshima Electric Railway (Enoshima: EN06)
- Odakyu Enoshima Line (Katase-Enoshima: OE16)
- Enoshima
