= Ōfuna Station =

Railway and monorail station in Kamakura, Kanagawa Prefecture, Japan

OFNJT07 JK01 JO09 JS09 Ōfuna 大船駅

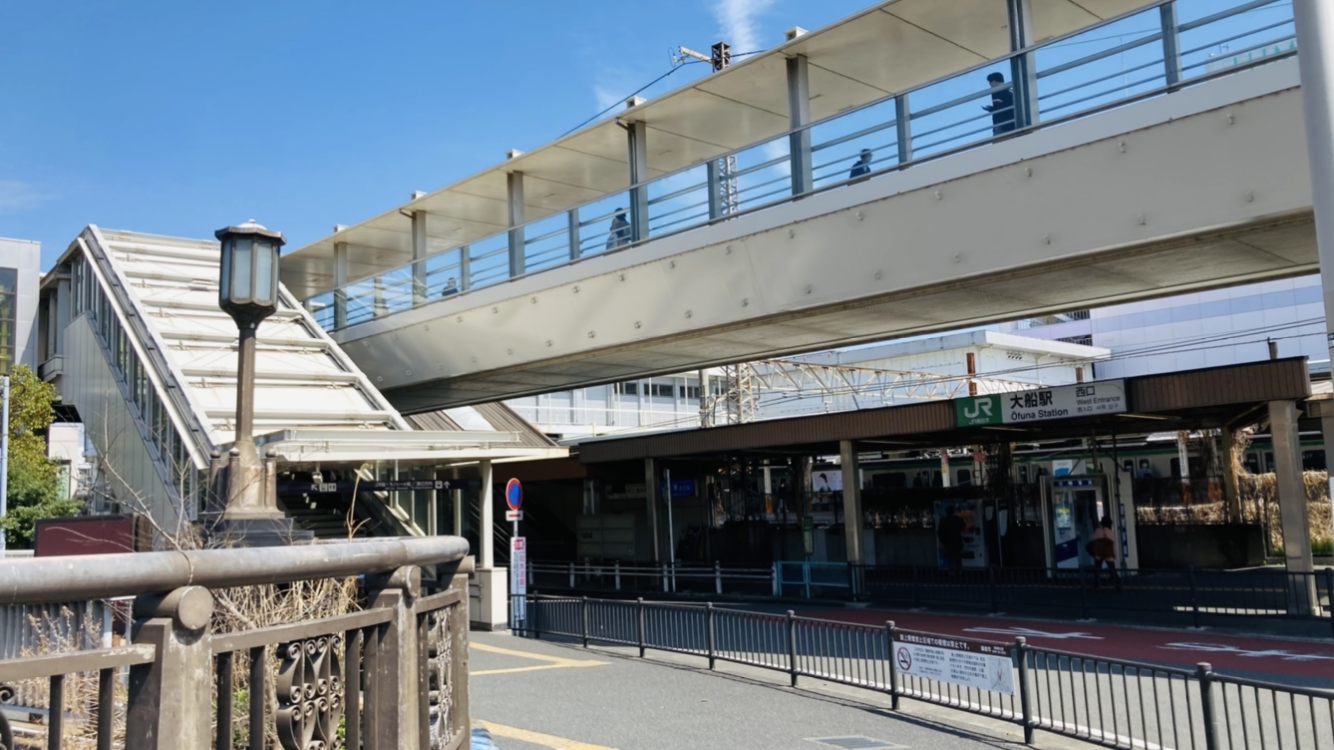
- West entrance to Ōfuna Station, March 2022

General information
- Location: 1 Ōfuna; Kamakura, Kanagawa; Japan
- Coordinates: 35°21′12″N 139°31′52″E
- Operator: JR East, Shonan Monorail
- Lines: Tōkaidō Main Line; Negishi Line; Yokosuka Line; Shōnan-Shinjuku Line; Shonan Monorail
- Connections: Bus terminal

History
- Opened: November 1, 1888

Passengers
- JR, FY2013: 97,118 daily

Services
Preceding station	JR East	Following station
Odawara JT16 towards Itō or Atami	Odoriko	Yokohama towards Tokyo
Fujisawa JT08 towards Odawara	Shōnan	Shinagawa towards Tokyo
Fujisawa JT08 towards Atami	Tōkaidō Line	Totsuka towards Tokyo
Terminus	Narita Express	Totsuka towards Narita Airport Terminal 1
Kita-Kamakura JO08 towards Kurihama	Yokosuka Line	Totsuka towards Tokyo
Fujisawa JT08 towards Odawara	Shōnan–Shinjuku Line Special Rapid Rapid	Totsuka towards Takasaki, Maebashi or Utsunomiya
Kita-Kamakura JS08 towards Zushi	Shōnan–Shinjuku Line Rapid Local	Totsuka towards Takasaki, Maebashi or Utsunomiya
Terminus	Negishi Line	Hongōdai JK02 towards Yokohama
Terminus	Yokohama Line Local	Hongōdai JK02 towards Hachiōji
Preceding station	Shonan Monorail	Following station
Fujimichō towards Shōnan-Enoshima	Enoshima Line	Terminus
Location

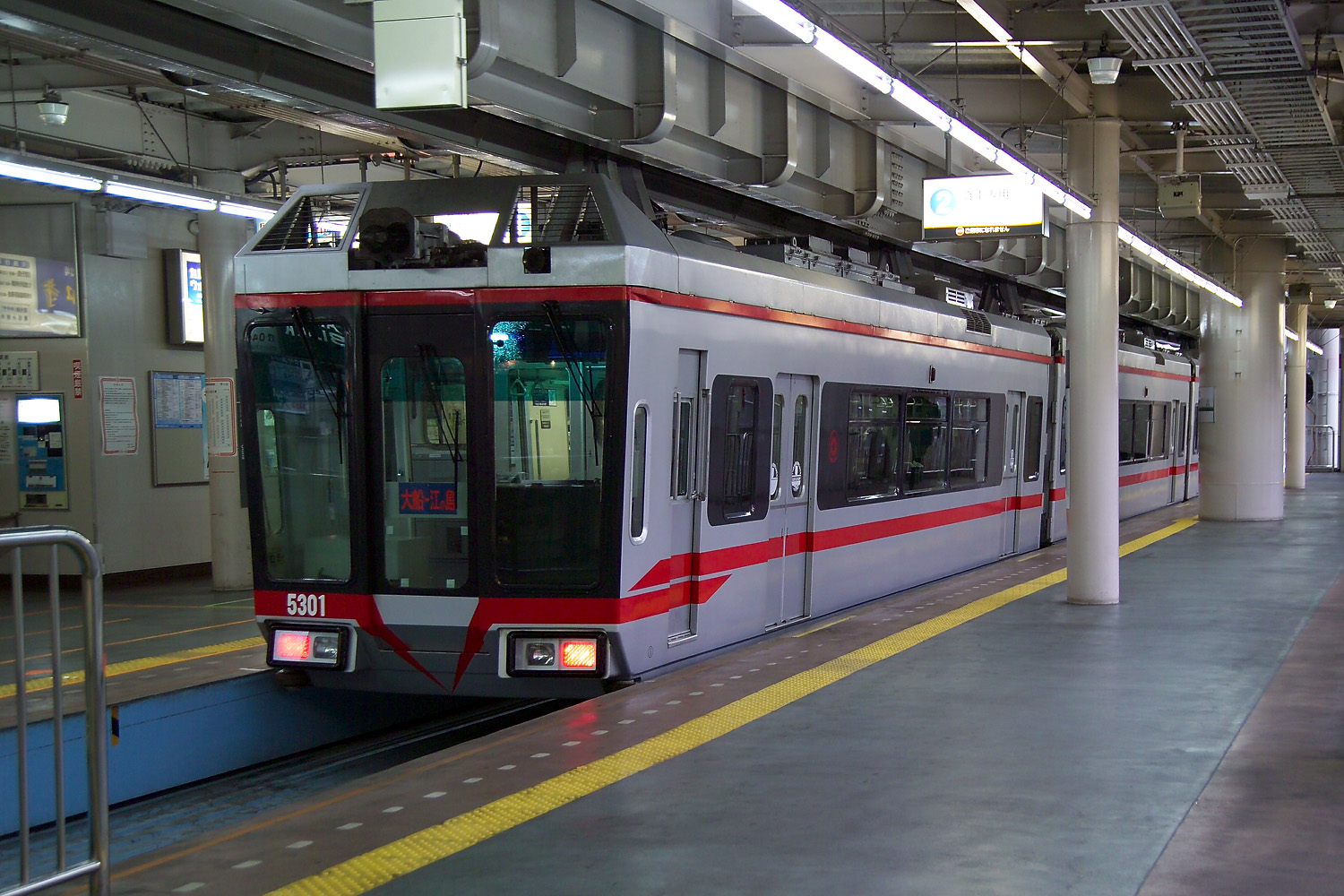
Shonan Monorail at Ōfuna Station

Ōfuna Station (Japanese: 大船駅, romanized: Ōfuna-eki) is a railway station in Kamakura, Kanagawa, Japan, operated by East Japan Railway Company (JR East) and Shonan Monorail.

== Lines ==
Ōfuna station is served by the Tokaido Main Line, Shōnan-Shinjuku Line, Negishi Line (Keihin-Tōhoku Line), Yokosuka Line, as well as the Shonan Monorail. It is 46.5 km from the terminus of the Tōkaidō Main Line at Tokyo Station.

== Station layout ==
Ōfuna stationis an elevated station with five island platforms serving a total of 11 tracks. The connected Shonan Monorail station has a single bay platform.

There are above-track station buildings at both ends of the platforms, toward Fujisawa and toward Totsuka, offering passage between lines inside the ticket gates. The Kashio River, which runs between the two current station buildings, is a city boundary, meaning that the end of the station near Fujisawa is in Kamakura, while the end toward Totsuka is in Sakae-ku, Yokohama. However, the station master's office is, as was before the station's rebuilding, on the Kamakura side, so the station is treated as a Kamakura station, and not considered to be within the city of Yokohama.

The Fujisawa-side station building has the southern ticket gates and connects to East and West exits. The station building is connected by a passageway beside the building to the Shonan Monorail station. There is also a Midori no Madoguchi staffed ticket office and a View Plaza travel agency.

In the Totsuka-side station building is the northern ticket gate, connected to the Kasama Entrance.

=== Platforms ===
1-2	Tōkaidō Line (Ueno-Tokyo Line)	for Yokohama, Tokyo, Ueno, Ōmiya; Utsunomiya Line for Utsunomiya and Kuroiso; Takasaki Line for Takasaki and Maebashi
1-2	Shōnan-Shinjuku Line	for Shinjuku, Ikebukuro, Ōmiya, Kumagaya, Takasaki, and Maebashi (via Takasaki Line)
3-4	Tōkaidō Line	for Hiratsuka, Kōzu, Odawara, Atami and Numazu; Itō Line for Itō
5-6	Yokosuka Line	for Yokohama, Musashi-Kosugi, Shinagawa and Tokyo; Sōbu Line (Rapid) for Chiba, Narita Line for Narita Airport, Uchibō Line for Kimitsu, Sotobō Line for Kazusa-Ichinomiya
5-6	Shōnan-Shinjuku Line	for Shinjuku, Ikebukuro, Ōmiya, Oyama, and Utsunomiya (via Utsunomiya Line)
5-6	■ Narita Express	for Yokohama, Tokyo, Narita Airport
7	Yokosuka Line	for Zushi, Kamakura, Yokosuka, and Kurihama
7	Shōnan-Shinjuku Line	for Shinjuku, Ikebukuro, Ōmiya, Oyama, and Utsunomiya (via Utsunomiya Line)
8	Yokosuka Line	for Zushi, Kamakura, Yokosuka, and Kurihama
9-10	Negishi Line	for Isogo, Yokohama, Tokyo, Ueno, and Ōmiya (via Keihin Tōhoku Line)
9-10	Yokohama Line	for Yokohama, Higashi-Kanagawa, Shin-Yokohama, Machida, and Hachioji

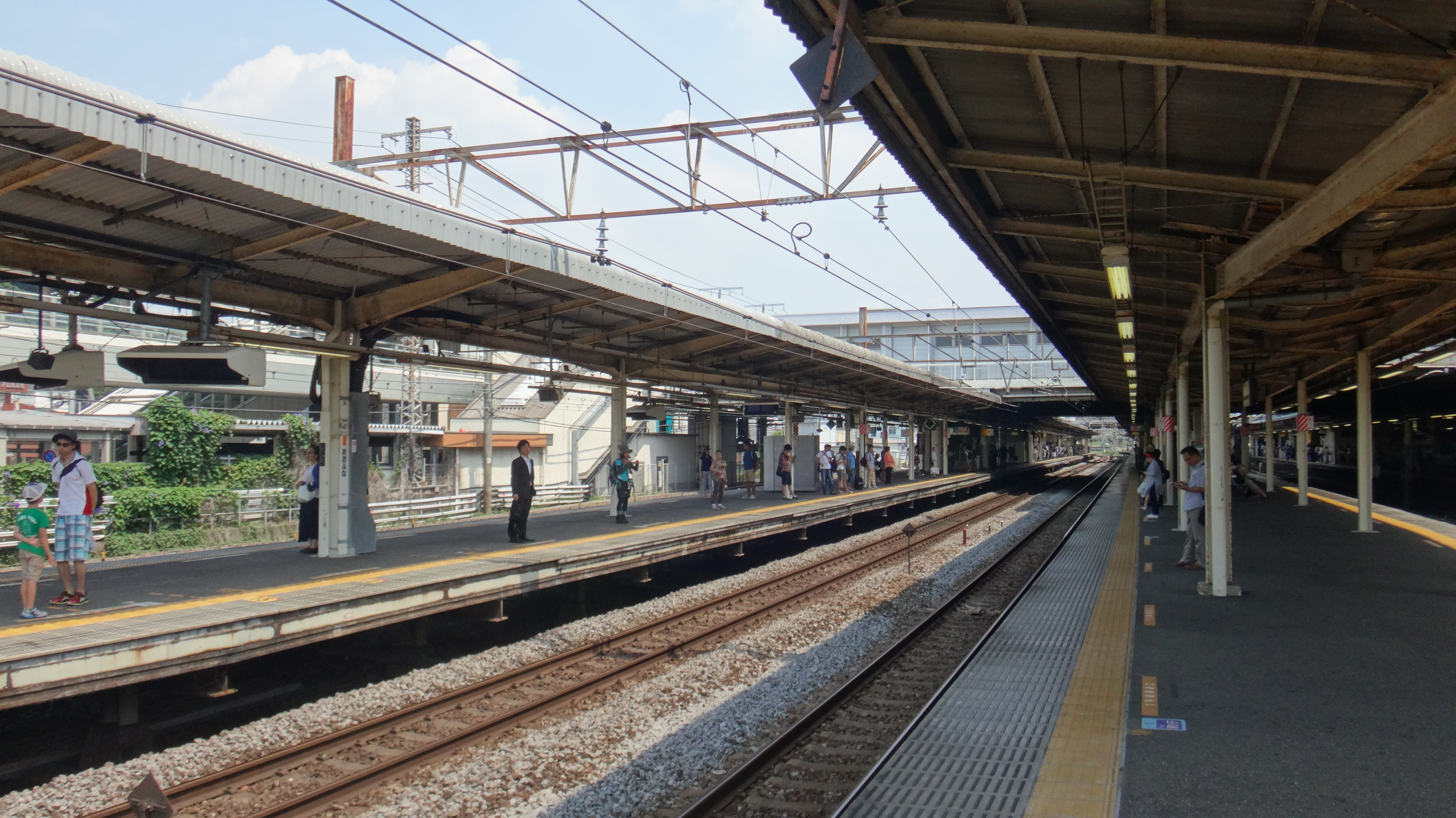
The south end of the down Tokaido Line platforms (3–4), July 2015

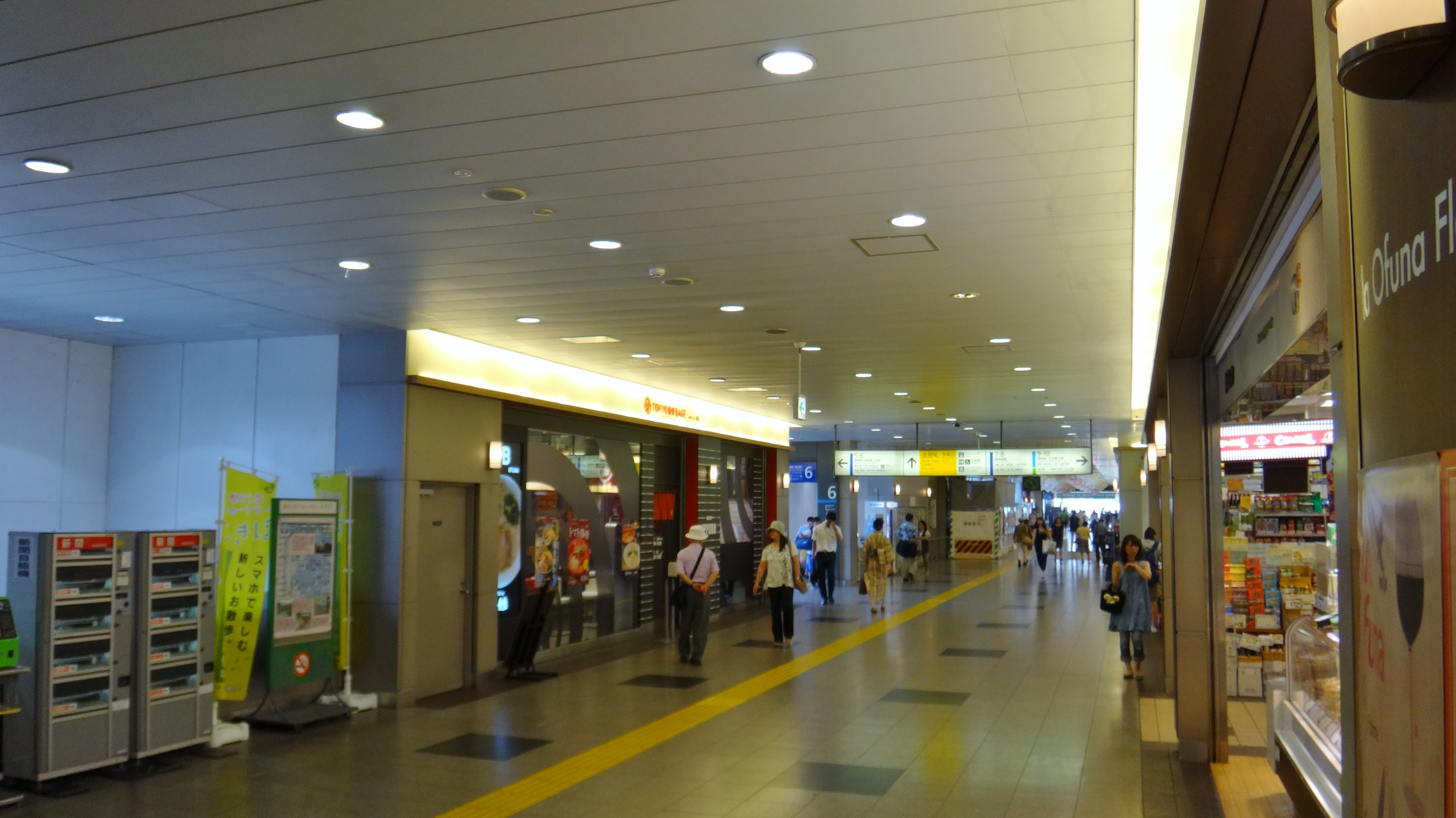
The station interior, July 2015

== History ==
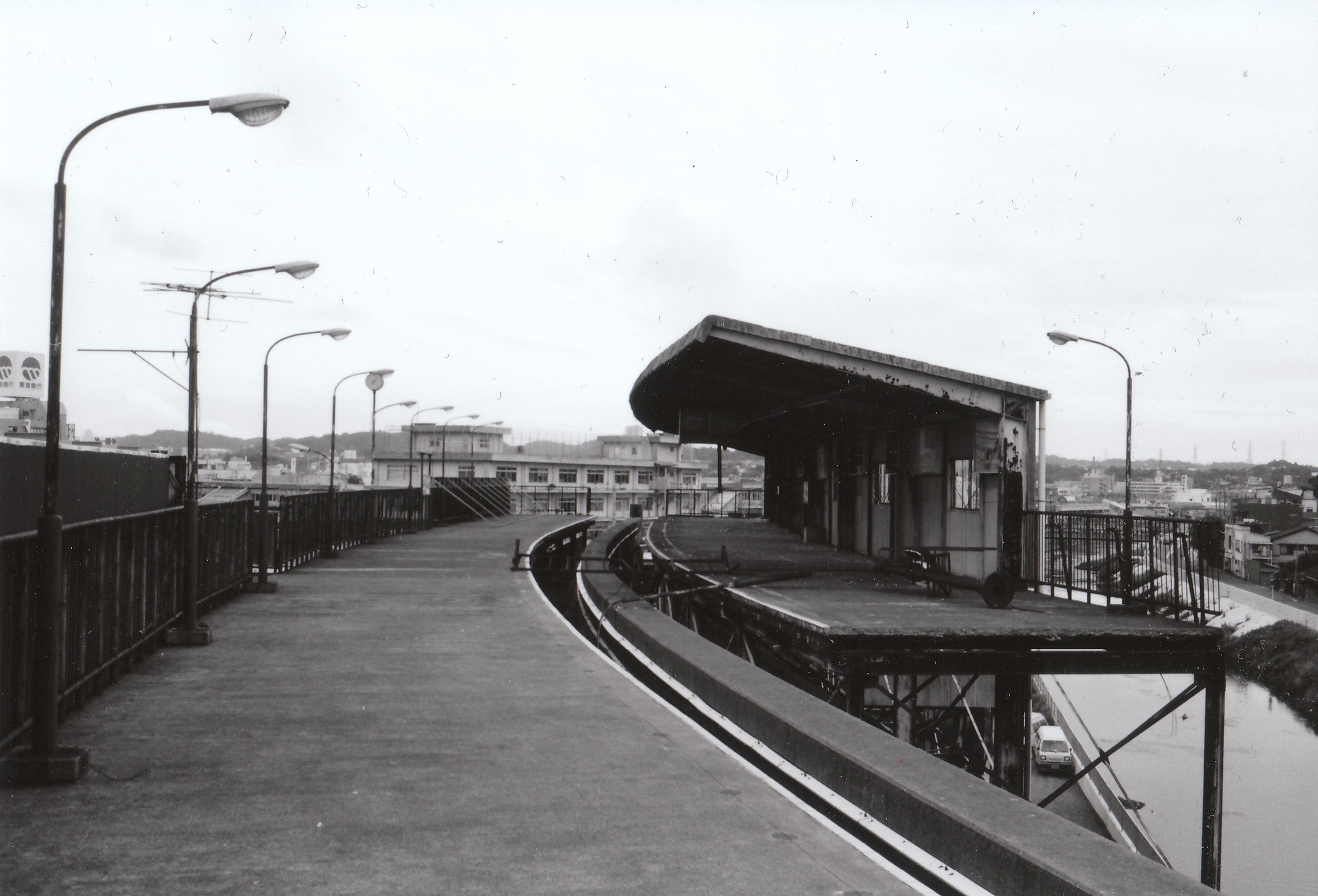
Yokohama Dreamland Monorail platforms in June 1984

Ōfuna Station opened on November 1, 1888, as a station on the Tōkaidō Main Line. The Yokosuka Line between Ōfuna and Yokosuka opened on June 16, 1889. Freight operations began in 1894.

In May 1966, the Yokohama Dreamland Monorail began operations from Ōfuna to Yokohama Dreamland, an amusement park built some 7 km north of the station. However, the monorail stopped running in September 1967 after cracks were found in the guideway. The monorail station was eventually decommissioned in 1992 and its former site is now an apartment block.

On March 7, 1970, another monorail began operations from Ōfuna to the south. This Shonan Monorail eventually connected the station to Enoshima.

== Passenger statistics ==
In fiscal 2013, the JR East station was used by an average of 97,118 passengers daily (boarding passengers only), making it the 42nd-busiest station operated by JR East. A total of 4,817,536 passengers used the Shōnan Monorail station in fiscal 2012. The daily average passenger figures (boarding passengers only) for JR East in previous years are as shown below.

Fiscal year	Daily average
2000	83,660
2005	87,333
2010	93,679
2011	93,397
2012	95,317
2013	97,118

== See also ==
- List of railway stations in Japan
