= Yuigahama Station =

Railway station in Kamakura, Kanagawa Prefecture, Japan

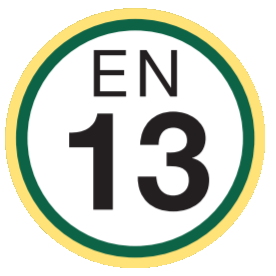
Yuigahama Station 由比ヶ浜駅

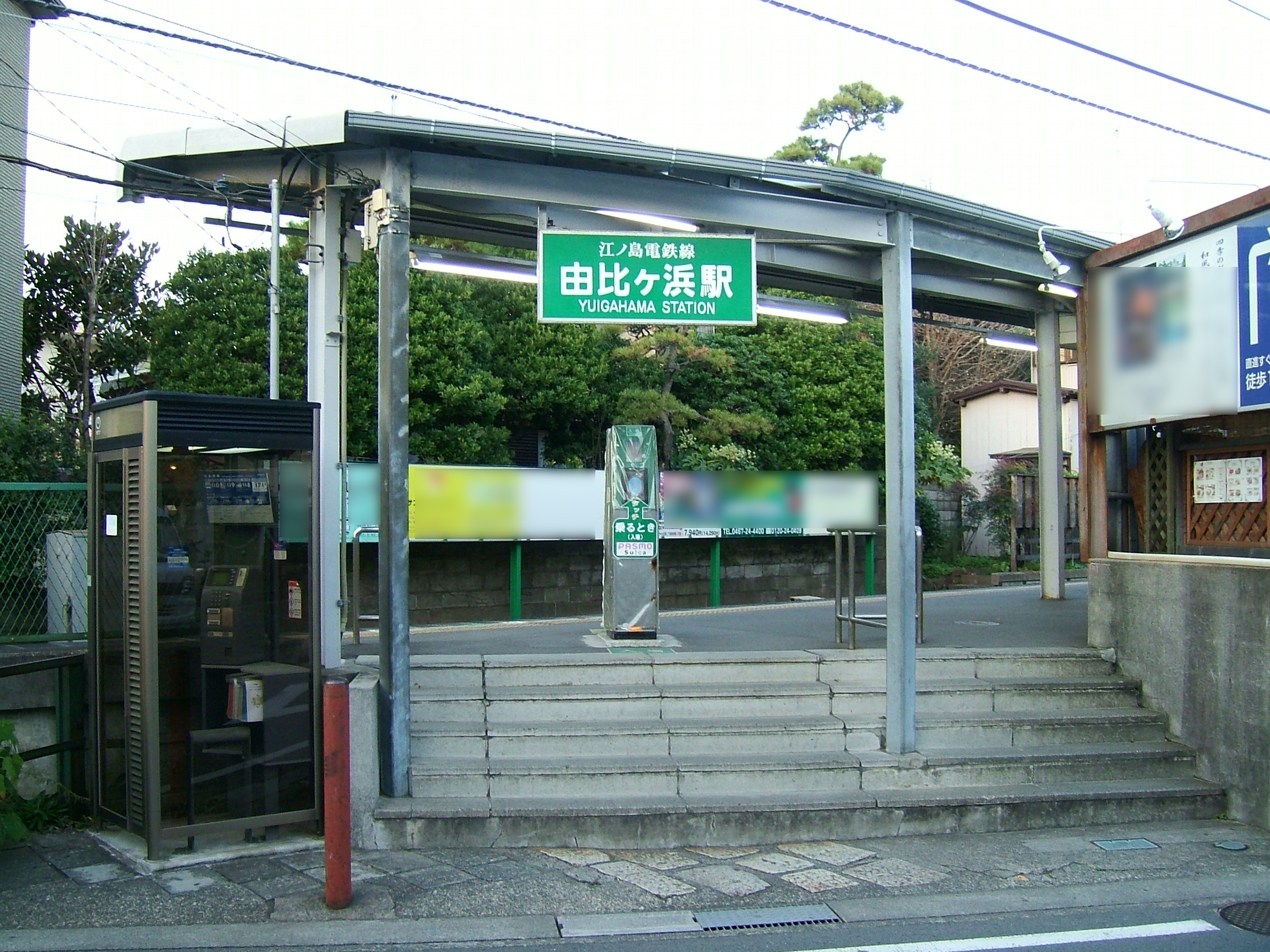
- Yuigahama Station Exit

General information
- Location: 3-10-13 Yuigahama; Kamakura; Japan
- Coordinates: 35°18′46″N 139°32′30″E
- Owner: Enoshima Electric Railway
- Distance: 8.9 km (5.5 mi) from Fujisawa
- Platforms: 1 side platform
- Tracks: 1

Construction
- Structure type: At-grade
- Accessible: Yes

Other information
- Status: Unstaffed
- Station code: EN13

History
- Opened: 16 August 1907

Passengers
- FY2019: 2,449 daily

Services
Preceding station	Enoshima Electric Railway	Following station
Hase towards Fujisawa	Enoden	Wadazuka towards Kamakura
Location
- Location within Kanagawa Prefecture Location within Japan

Yuigahama Station (Japanese: 由比ヶ浜駅, Hepburn: Yuigahama-eki) is a railway station on the Enoshima Electric Railway (Enoden) located in the Yuigahama neighborhood of Kamakura, Japan.

== Service ==
Yuigahama Station is served by the Enoshima Electric Railway Main Line and is located 8.9 kilometers (5.5 mi) from the line's terminus at Fujisawa Station.

The station consists of a single side platform serving one track used for bi-directional traffic. The station is equipped with a restroom, but is unstaffed.

== History ==
Yuigahama Station was opened on 16 August 1907.

Station numbering was introduced to the Enoshima Electric Railway January 2014 with Yuigahama being assigned station number EN13.

== Passenger statistics ==
In fiscal 2019, the station was used by an average of 2,449 passengers daily, making it the 11th used of the 15 Enoden stations

The average passenger figures for previous years (boarding passengers only) are as shown below.

Fiscal year	daily average
2005	531
2010	323
2015	1,022

== Surrounding area ==
- Amanawa Jinja
- Yuigahama Beach
