= Ishigami =

Ishigami (written: 石上 or 石神) is a Japanese surname. Notable people with the surname include:

- Jun'ya Ishigami (石上 純也, born 1974), Japanese architect
- Kosei Ishigami (石神 幸征, born 1990), Japanese footballer
- Naoya Ishigami (石神 直哉, born 1985), Japanese footballer
- Peter Baptist Tadamaro Ishigami (ペトロ・バプティスタ 石神 忠真郎, 1920–2014), Japanese Roman Catholic bishop
- Shizuka Ishigami (石上 静香, born 1988), Japanese voice actress
- Yoshinori Ishigami (石神 良訓, born 1957), Japanese footballer

== Fictional characters ==
- Yū Ishigami (石上 優), a character in the manga series Kaguya-sama: Love Is War
- Senku Ishigami (石神千空), a character from the manga and anime series Dr. Stone

== See also ==
- Ishigami Station, a railway station in Fujisawa, Kanagawa Prefecture, Japan
