= Yanagikōji Station =

Railway station in Fujisawa, Kanagawa Prefecture, Japan

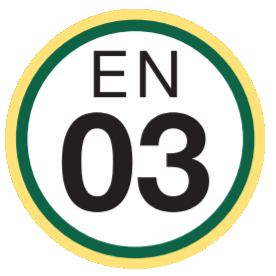
Yanagikōji Station 柳小路駅

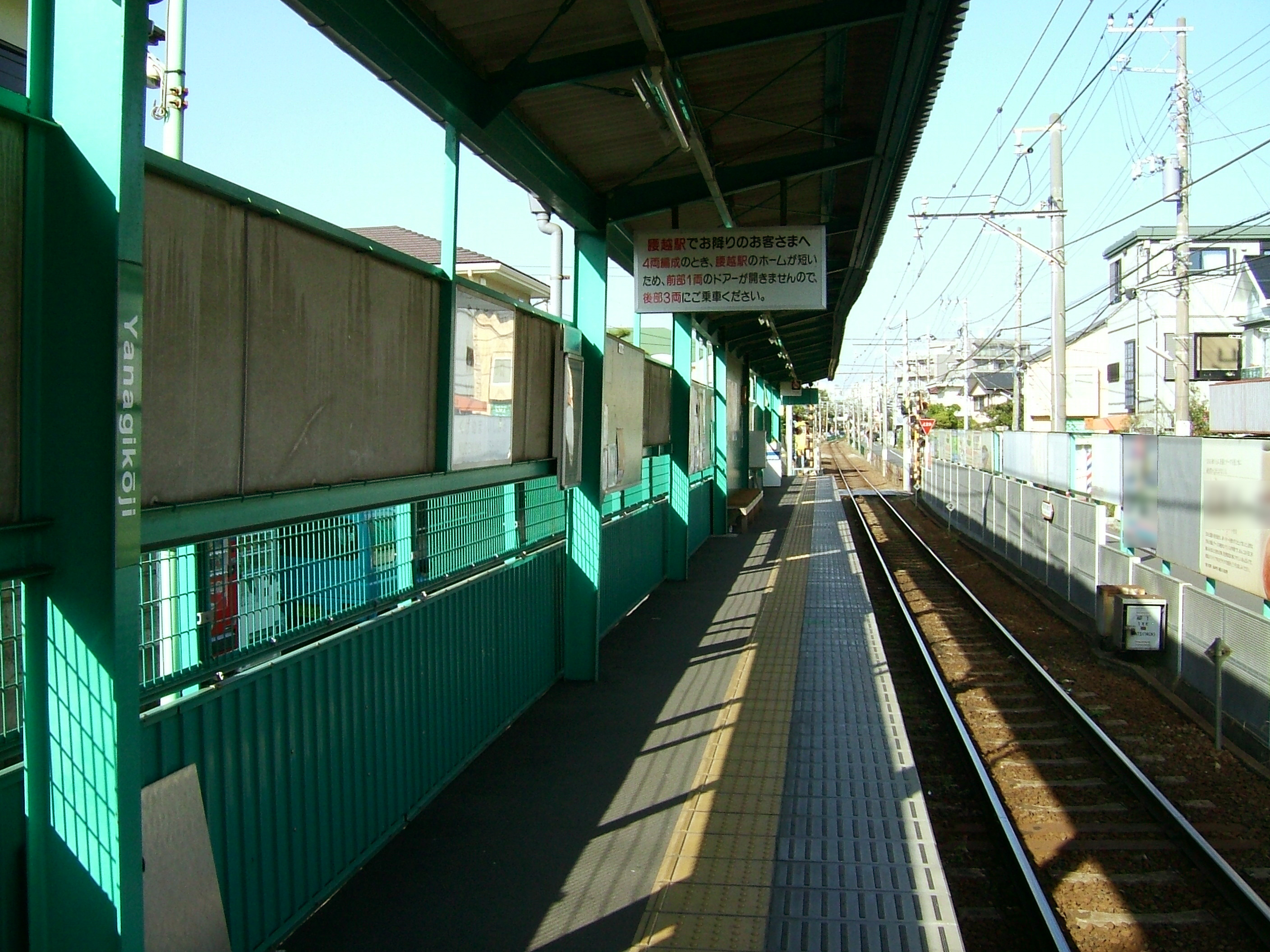
- Yanagikōji Station platform

General information
- Location: 4-8-11 Kugenuma Fujigaya; Fujisawa; Japan
- Coordinates: 35°19′38″N 139°29′07″E
- Owner: Enoshima Electric Railway
- Distance: 1.2 km (0.75 mi) from Fujisawa
- Platforms: 1 side platform
- Tracks: 1

Construction
- Structure type: At-grade
- Accessible: Yes

Other information
- Status: Unstaffed
- Station code: EN03

History
- Opened: 1 April 1920

Passengers
- FY2019: 2,714 daily

Services
Preceding station	Enoshima Electric Railway	Following station
Ishigami towards Fujisawa	Enoden	Kugenuma towards Kamakura
Location
- Location within Kanagawa Prefecture Location within Japan

Yanagikōji Station (Japanese: 柳小路駅, Hepburn: Yanagikōji-eki) is a railway station on the Enoshima Electric Railway (Enoden) located in the city of Fujisawa, Japan.

== Service ==
Yanagikōji Station is served by the Enoshima Electric Railway Main Line and is located 1.2 kilometers (0.75 mi) from the line's terminus at Fujisawa Station.

The station consists of a single side platform serving one track used for bi-directional traffic. The station is unstaffed.

== History ==
Yanagikōji Station was opened on 1 April 1920. It was closed on 30 June 1944 during World War II and reopened on 15 July 1950.

Station numbering was introduced to the Enoshima Electric Railway January 2014 with Yanagikōji being assigned station numbers EN03.

== Passenger statistics ==
In fiscal 2019, the station was used by an average of 2,714 passengers daily, making it 10th used of the 15 Enoden stations

The passenger figures for previous years are as shown below.

Fiscal year	daily average
2005	2,178
2010	2,073
2015	2,544

== Surrounding area ==
- Kugenuma High School
