= Kugenuma Station =

Railway station in Fujisawa, Kanagawa Prefecture, Japan

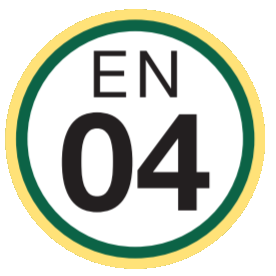
Kugenuma Station 鵠沼駅

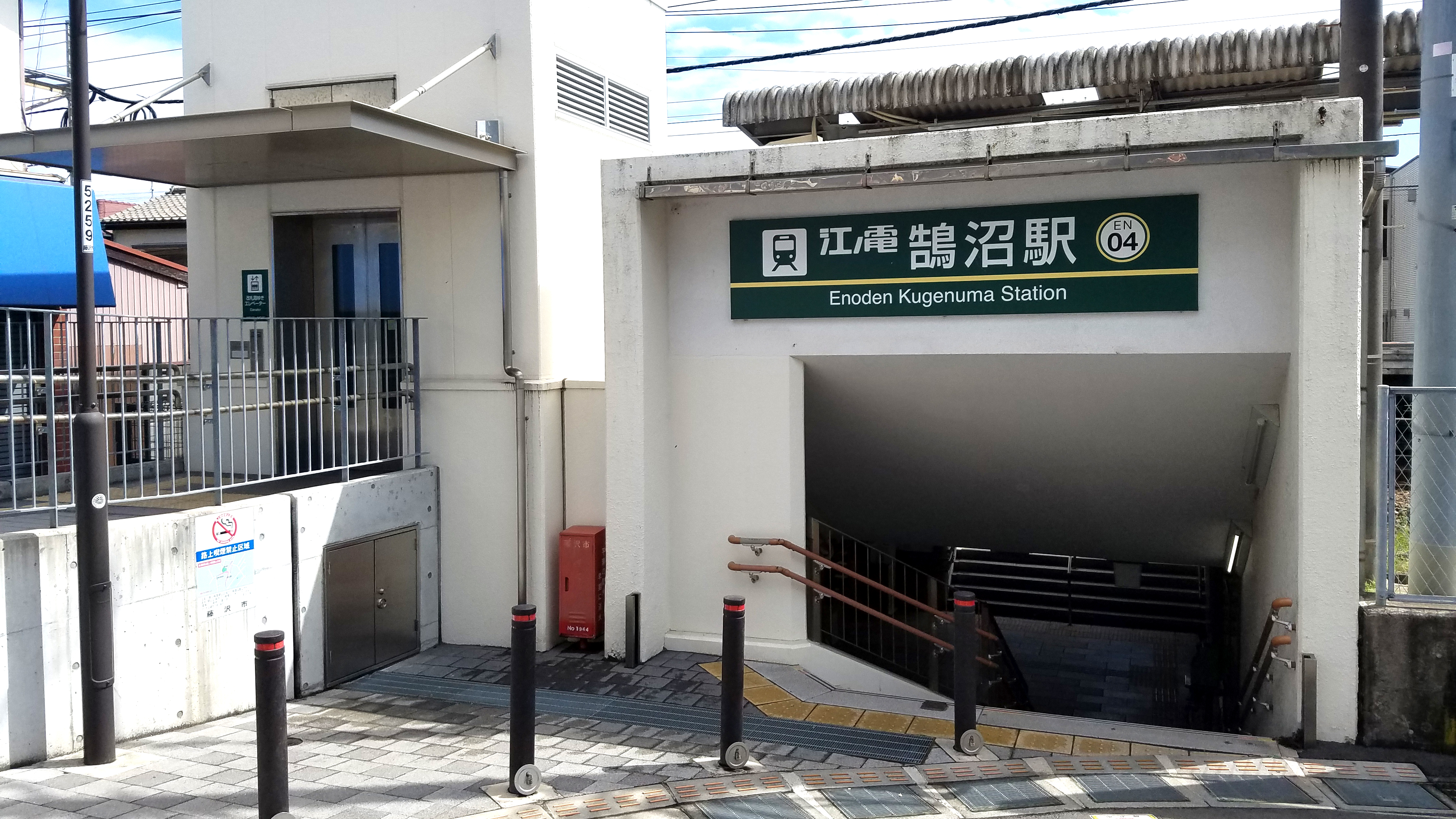
- Kugenuma Station west exit in 2020

General information
- Location: 1-1-1 Kugenuma-Matsugaoka; Fujisawa; Japan
- Coordinates: 35°19′17″N 139°28′58″E
- Owner: Enoshima Electric Railway
- Distance: 1.9 km (1.2 mi) from Fujisawa
- Platforms: 1 island platform
- Tracks: 2

Construction
- Structure type: Embankment
- Accessible: Yes

Other information
- Status: Unstaffed
- Station code: EN04

History
- Opened: 1 September 1902
- Rebuilt: 1985

Passengers
- FY2019: 4,278 daily

Services
Preceding station	Enoshima Electric Railway	Following station
Yanagikōji towards Fujisawa	Enoden	Shōnankaigankōen towards Kamakura
Location
- Location within Kanagawa Prefecture Location within Japan

Kugenuma Station (Japanese: 鵠沼駅, Hepburn: Kugenuma-eki) is a railway station on the Enoshima Electric Railway (Enoden) located in the city of Fujisawa, Japan.

== Service ==
Kugenuma Station is served by the Enoshima Electric Railway Main Line and is located 1.9 km (1.2 mi) from the line's terminus at Fujisawa Station.

The station consists of a single island platform serving two tracks. An underground concourse beneath the platform functions as the station building and contains the fare collection area. A waiting room is located on the platform, while a restroom is provided on the underground level.

An elevator connects the underground level with the platform and the west side of the station. The east side of the station is accessible only by stairs. The station is unstaffed.

== History ==
Kugenuma Station was opened on 1 September 1902. The station building was rebuilt in 1985.

Station numbering was introduced to the Enoshima Electric Railway in January 2014, with Kugenuma being assigned station numbers EN04.

== Passenger statistics ==
In fiscal 2019, the station was used by an average of 4,278 passengers daily, making it the 4th used of the 15 Enoden stations

The passenger figures for previous years are as shown below.

Fiscal year	daily average
2005	5,100
2010	4,258
2015	4,730

== Surrounding area ==
- Sakai River
- Shonan Gakuen Junior and Senior High School
