= Shōnankaigankōen Station =

Railway station in Fujisawa, Kanagawa Prefecture, Japan

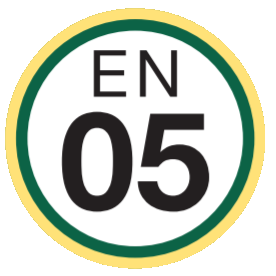
Shōnankaigankōen Station 湘南海岸公園駅

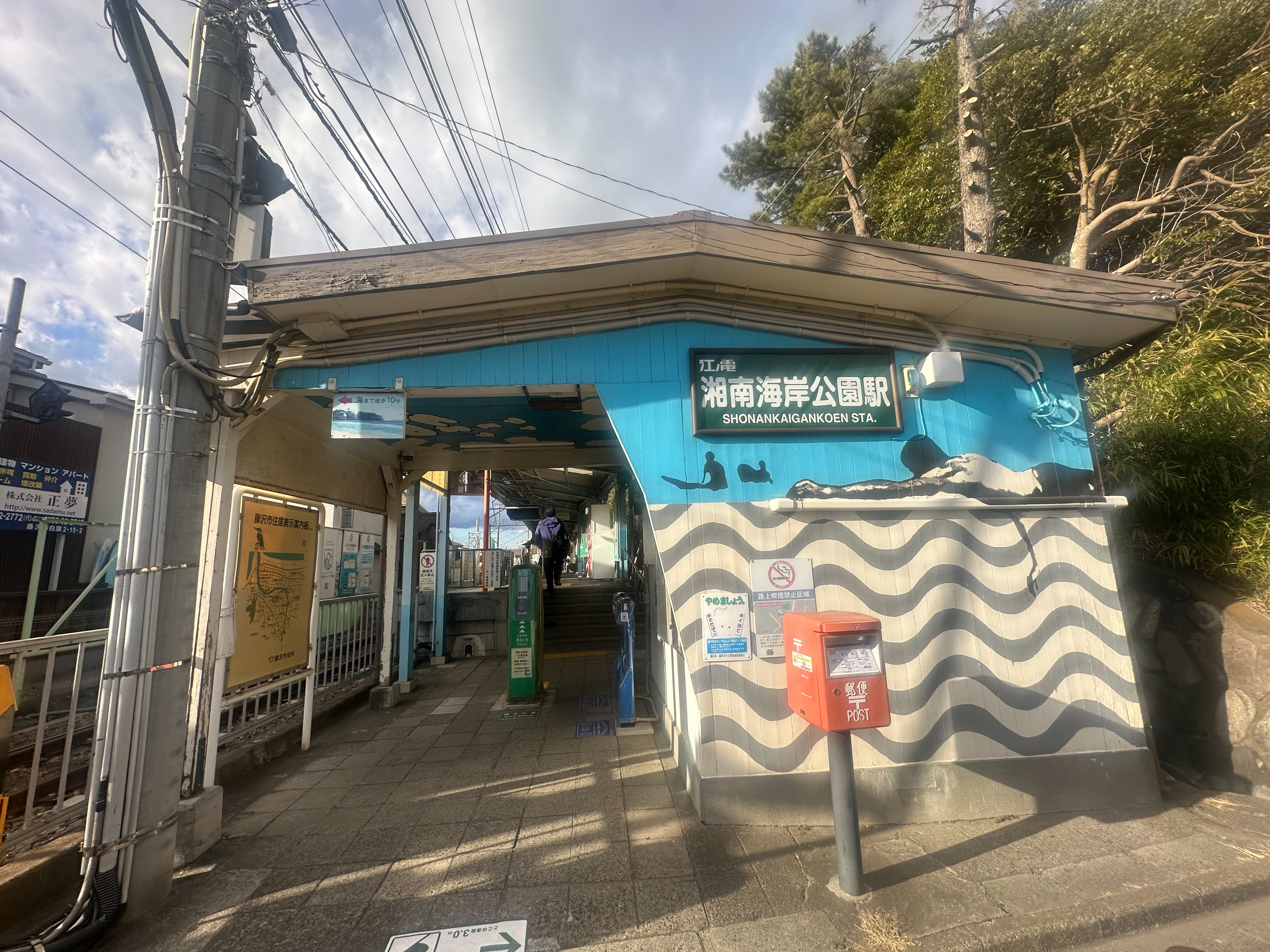
- Shōnankaigankōen Station East Exit

General information
- Location: 4-9-22 Katase; Fujisawa; Japan
- Coordinates: 35°18′55″N 139°29′00″E
- Owner: Enoshima Electric Railway
- Distance: 2.7 km (1.7 mi) from Fujisawa
- Platforms: 1 side platform
- Tracks: 1

Construction
- Structure type: At-grade
- Accessible: Yes

Other information
- Status: Unstaffed
- Station code: EN05

History
- Opened: 1 September 1904
- Former names: Nishikata (until 1958)

Passengers
- FY2019: 1,976 daily

Services
Preceding station	Enoshima Electric Railway	Following station
Kugenuma towards Fujisawa	Enoden	Enoshima towards Kamakura
Location
- Location within Kanagawa Prefecture Location within Japan

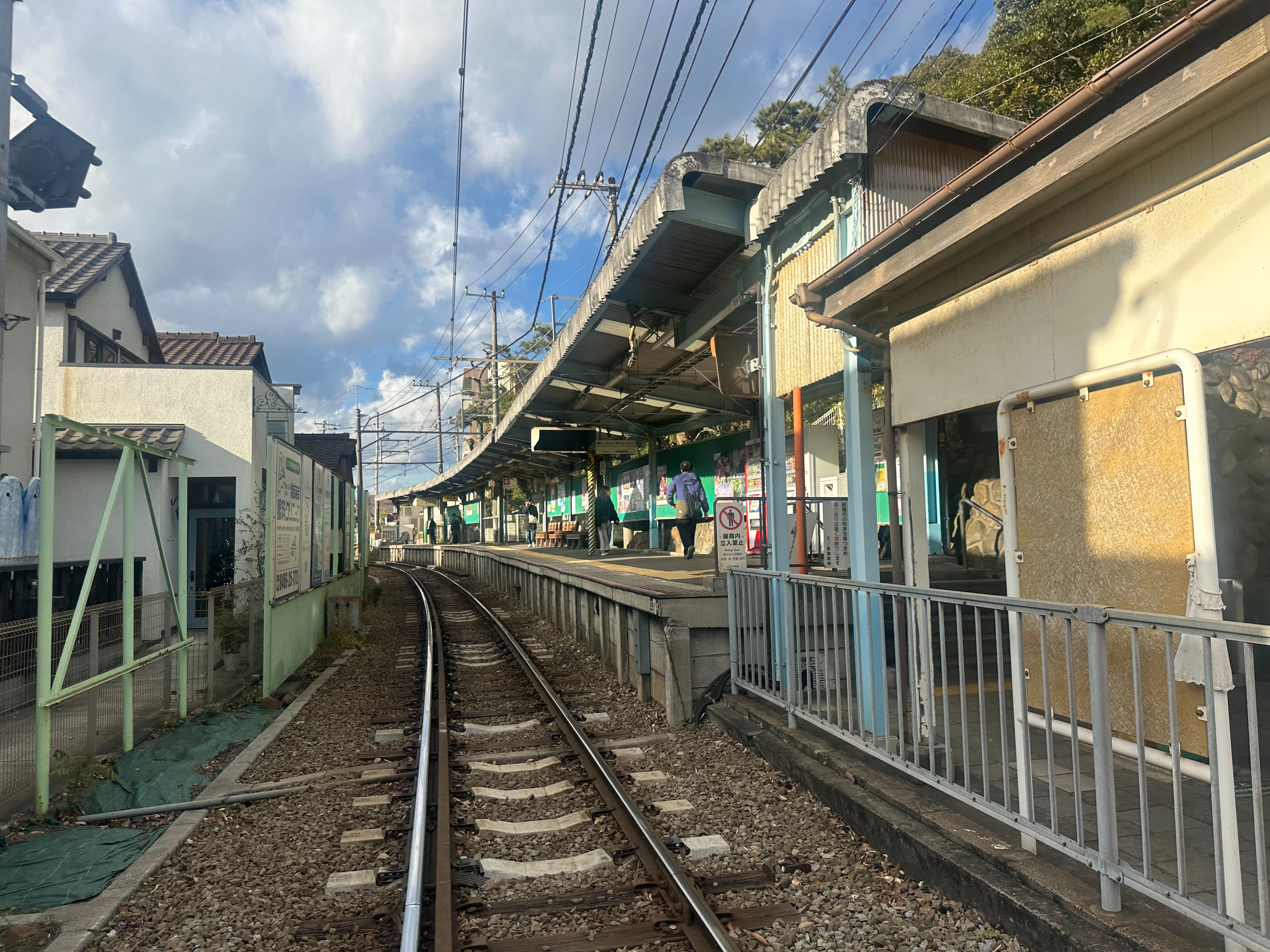
Station platform

Shōnankaigankōen Station (Japanese: 湘南海岸公園駅, Hepburn: Shōnankaigankōen-eki; lit. 'Shōnan Kaigan Park Station') is a railway station on the Enoshima Electric Railway (Enoden) located in the city of Fujisawa, Japan.

== Service ==
Shōnankaigankōen Station is served by the Enoshima Electric Railway Main Line and is located 2.7 kilometers (1.7 mi) from the line's terminus at Fujisawa Station.

The station consists of a single side platform serving one track used for bi-directional traffic. The station is unstaffed.

== History ==
Shōnankaigankōen Station was opened on 1 September 1904 as Nishikata Station (西方駅, Nishikata-eki). It was renamed to its present name on 1 December 1958.

Station numbering was introduced to the Enoshima Electric Railway January 2014 with Shōnankaigankōen being assigned station number EN05.

== Passenger statistics ==
In fiscal 2019, the station was used by an average of 1,976 passengers daily, making it the 12th used of the 15 Enoden stations

The passenger figures for previous years are as shown below.

Fiscal year	daily average
2005	1,418
2010	1,529
2015	2,423

== Surrounding area ==
- Shōnankaigan Park
- Shōnan Beach
- Suwa Shrine
