= Wadazuka Station =

Railway station in Kamakura, Kanagawa Prefecture, Japan

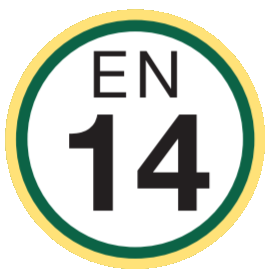
Wadazuka Station 和田塚駅

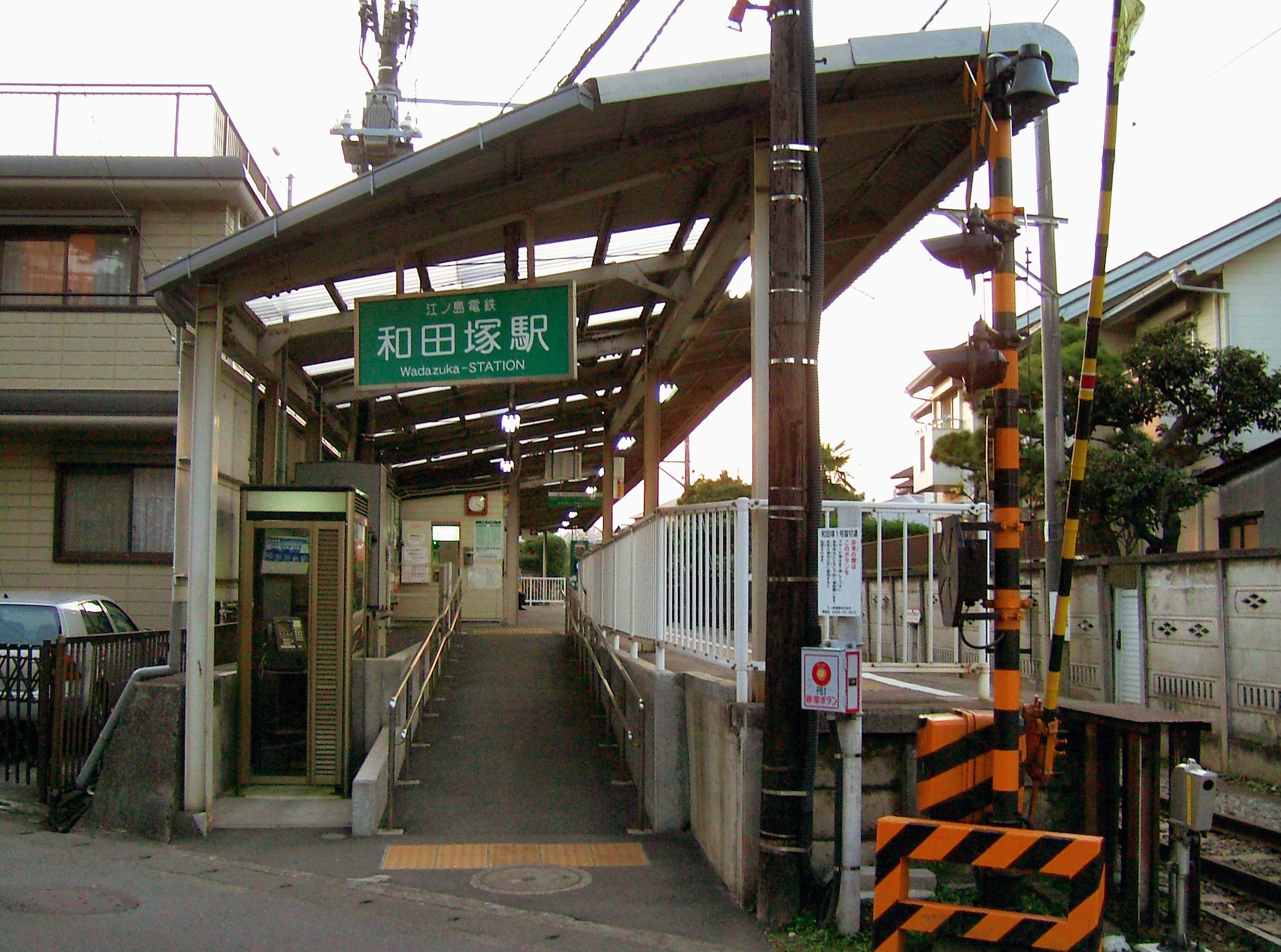
- Wadazuka Station Exit

General information
- Location: 3-4-1 Yuigahama; Kamakura; Japan
- Coordinates: 35°18′49″N 139°32′43″E
- Owner: Enoshima Electric Railway
- Distance: 9.2 km (5.7 mi) from Fujisawa
- Platforms: 1 side platform
- Tracks: 1

Construction
- Structure type: At-grade
- Accessible: Yes

Other information
- Status: Unstaffed
- Station code: EN14

History
- Opened: 16 August 1907

Passengers
- FY2019: 1,275 daily

Services
Preceding station	Enoshima Electric Railway	Following station
Yuigahama towards Fujisawa	Enoden	Kamakura Terminus
Location
- Location within Kanagawa Prefecture Location within Japan

Wadazuka Station (Japanese: 和田塚駅, Hepburn: Wadazuka-eki) is a railway station on the Enoshima Electric Railway (Enoden) located in the Yuigahama neighborhood of Kamakura, Japan.

== Service ==
Wadazuka Station is served by the Enoshima Electric Railway Main Line and is located 9.2 kilometers (5.7 mi) from the line's terminus at Fujisawa Station.

The station consists of a single side platform serving one track used for bi-directional traffic. The station is equipped with a restroom, but is unstaffed.

== History ==
Wadazuka Station was opened on 16 August 1907.

Station numbering was introduced to the Enoshima Electric Railway January 2014 with Wadazuka being assigned station number EN14.

== Passenger statistics ==
In fiscal 2019, the station was used by an average of 1,275 passengers daily, making it the 4th used of the 15 Enoden stations

The average passenger figures for previous years (boarding passengers only) are as shown below.

Fiscal year	daily average
2005	313
2010	189
2015	750

== Surrounding area ==
- Kamakura Kaihin Koen
