= Enoshima Electric Railway =

Railway in Kanagawa Prefecture, Japan

Enoshima Electric Railway Co., Ltd.

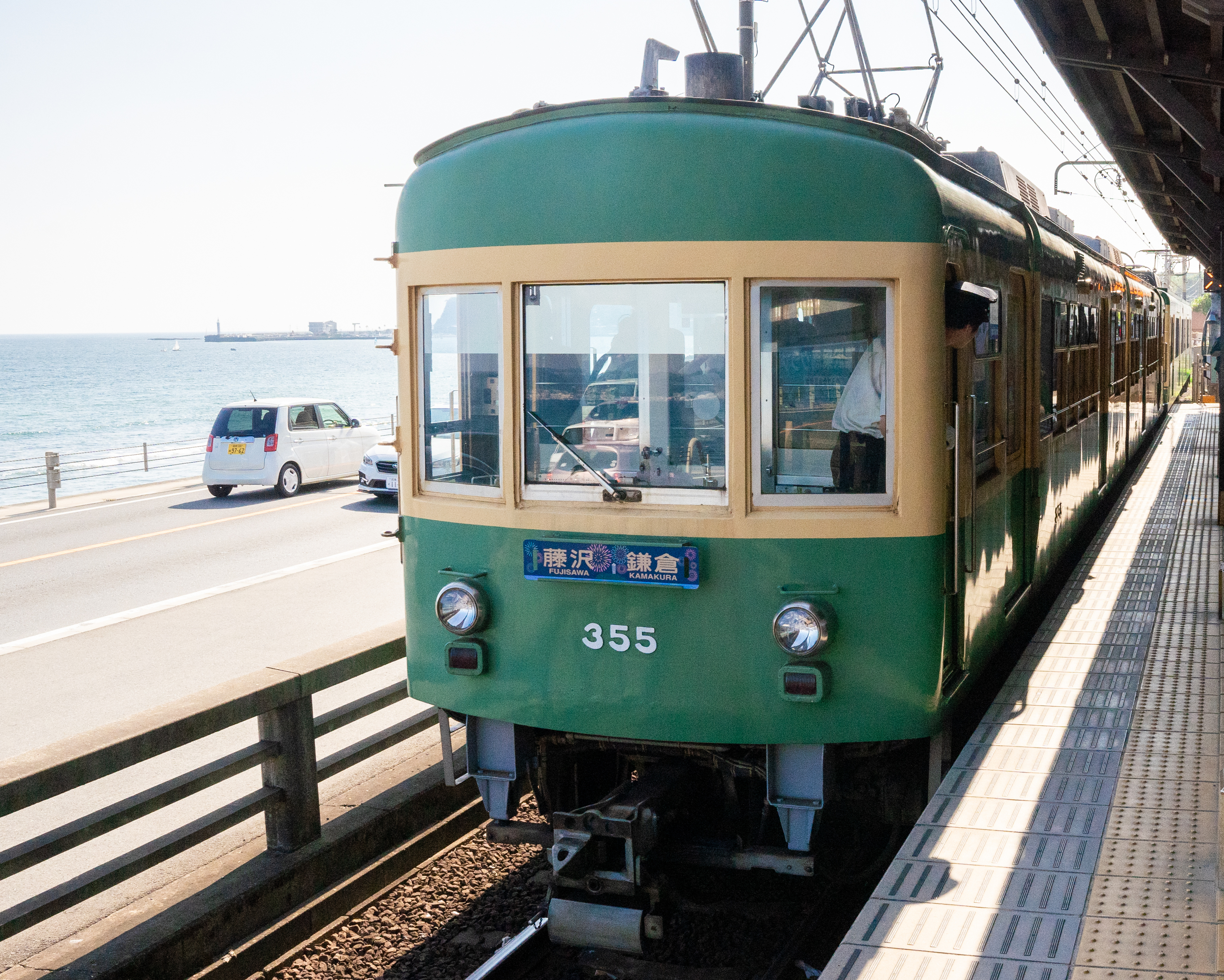
- 300 series train, dating to 1960, running along the coast at Kamakurakōkōmae Station

Overview
- Other name: Enoden
- Native name: 江ノ島電鉄株式会社
- Owner: Odakyu Group
- Locale: Fujisawa, Kanagawa, Japan
- Termini: Fujisawa; Kamakura
- Stations: 15
- Website: enoden.co.jp/en

Service
- Depots: Gokurakuji; Enoshima
- Ridership: 18,099,000 (JFY2023)

History
- Opened: 25 November 1900

Technical
- Line length: 10 km (6.2 mi)
- Num of tracks: 1
- Track gauge: 1,067 mm (3 ft 6 in)
- Electrification: Overhead line, 600 V DC
- Operating speed: 45 km/h (28 mph)
- Signaling: Automatic block
- Train protection system: ATS
Route map

Enoshima Electric Railway Co., Ltd. (Japanese: 江ノ島電鉄株式会社, Hepburn: Enoshima Dentetsu Kabushiki Gaisha) is a private railway operator in Kanagawa Prefecture, Japan. Its sole line runs between Kamakura Station in Kamakura and Fujisawa Station in Fujisawa, and both the company and the line are commonly known as Enoden (江ノ電). (Note: A contraction of the company's Japanese name, Enoshima Dentetsu.) A wholly owned subsidiary of the Odakyu Group, the company also operates local bus services. The line is popular with visitors to the Shōnan coast, especially those traveling to Enoshima, as sections run close to the shoreline with views of Sagami Bay; its distinctive rolling stock, appearances in television productions, and short street-running segment have further contributed to its appeal.

The 10-kilometre (6.2 mi) line is built to a 1,067 mm (3 ft 6 in) narrow gauge and is primarily single-track, with passing loops at five of its fifteen stations to permit bidirectional operation. A 450-metre (1,480 ft) section between Koshigoe and Enoshima features street running. The route is regulated under the Railway Business Act, with an exemption permitting street running, a provision shared by only a few other lines, including the Keihan Keishin Line, Keihan Ishiyama-Sakamoto Line, and Kumamoto Electric Railway. Trains operate on 600 V DC power from overhead lines.

The railway opened on 25 November 1900. Ownership later passed to the Yokohama Electric Railway Company in 1911, Tokyo Electric Power Company in 1921, the second Enoshima Electric Railway Co. in 1926, Tokyu Corporation in 1938, Enoshima Kamakura Tourist Company in 1949, and Odakyu in 1953. The present company was established on 1 September 1981 as an Odakyu subsidiary.

== Stations ==
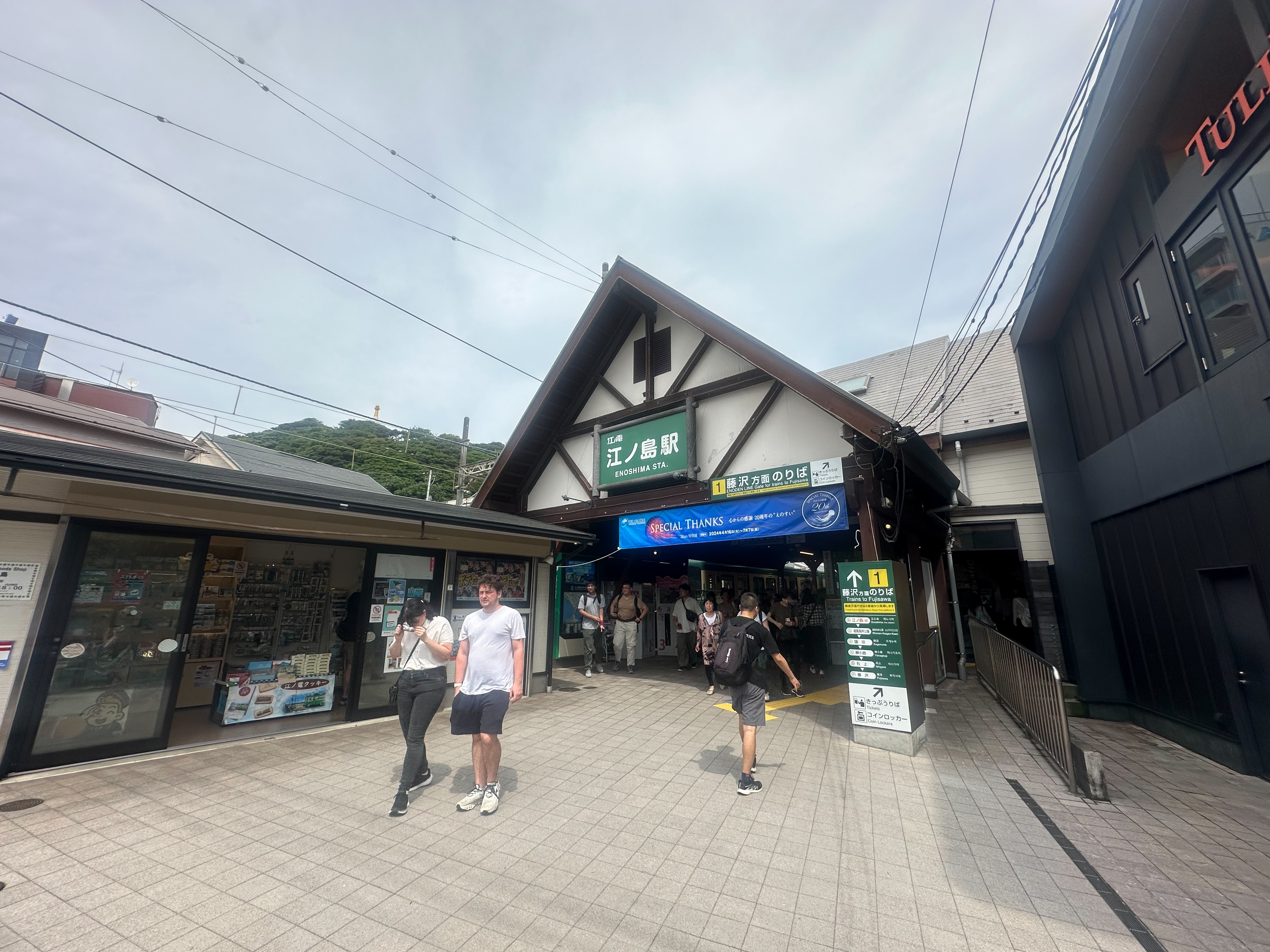
Enoshima Station, 2024

The entire line is located in Kanagawa Prefecture.

Trains can pass one another at stations marked "◇" and "^" and cannot pass at stations marked "｜".

No.	Station	Distance in km (mi)		Transfers	Track layout	Location
No.	Station	Between stations	Total	Transfers	Track layout	Location
EN-01	Fujisawa 藤沢	—N/a	0 (0)	Tōkaidō Line (JT08); Odakyū Enoshima Line (OE13)	|	Fujisawa
EN-02	Ishigami 石上	0.6 (0.37)	0.6 (0.37)		|	Fujisawa
EN-03	Yanagikōji 柳小路	0.6 (0.37)	1.2 (0.75)		|	Fujisawa
EN-04	Kugenuma 鵠沼	0.7 (0.43)	1.9 (1.2)		◇	Fujisawa
EN-05	Shōnankaigankōen 湘南海岸公園	0.8 (0.50)	2.7 (1.7)		|	Fujisawa
EN-06	Enoshima 江ノ島	0.6 (0.37)	3.3 (2.1)	Odakyū Enoshima Line (Katase-Enoshima: OE16); Shonan Monorail (Shōnan-Enoshima: SMR8)	◇	Fujisawa
EN-07	Koshigoe 腰越	0.6 (0.37)	3.9 (2.4)		|	Kamakura
EN-08	Kamakurakōkōmae 鎌倉高校前	0.8 (0.50)	4.7 (2.9)		|	Kamakura
	Minegahara Signal Station	—N/a	5.1 (3.2)		◇	Kamakura
EN-09	Shichirigahama 七里ヶ浜	0.9 (0.56)	5.6 (3.5)		|	Kamakura
EN-10	Inamuragasaki 稲村ケ崎	1.2 (0.75)	6.8 (4.2)		◇	Kamakura
EN-11	Gokurakuji 極楽寺	0.8 (0.50)	7.6 (4.7)		|	Kamakura
EN-12	Hase 長谷	0.7 (0.43)	8.3 (5.2)		◇	Kamakura
EN-13	Yuigahama 由比ヶ浜	0.6 (0.37)	8.9 (5.5)		|	Kamakura
EN-14	Wadazuka 和田塚	0.3 (0.19)	9.2 (5.7)		|	Kamakura
EN-15	Kamakura 鎌倉	0.8 (0.50)	10.0 (6.2)	Yokosuka Line (JO07); Shōnan–Shinjuku Line (JS07)	^	Kamakura

== Rolling stock ==
As of 14 July 2026, Enoden operates a fleet of 16 two-car electric multiple unit (EMU) train types as shown below.

Type	Car numbers		Manufacturer	Date built	Notes
300 series	305	355	Toyoko Sharyo	May 1960	Rebuilt from former Keio DeHa 2000.
1000 series	1002	1052	Tokyu Car	November 1979	Scheduled to be retired by January 2027.
1000 series	1101	1151	Tokyu Car	December 1981	
1000 series	1201	1251	Tokyu Car	December 1983	
1000 series	1501	1551	Tokyu Car	November 1979	
1000 series	1502	1552	Tokyu Car	November 1979	
2000 series	2001	2051	Tokyu Car	March 1990	
2000 series	2002	2052	Tokyu Car	March 1991	
2000 series	2003	2053	Tokyu Car	July 1991	
10 series	10	50	Tokyu Car	March 1997	
20 series	21	61	Tokyu Car	March 2002	Built using running gear from former 500 series.
20 series	22	62	Tokyu Car	March 2003	
500 series	501	551	Tokyu Car	March 2006	
500 series	502	552	Tokyu Car	March 2008	
700 series	701	751	J-TREC	April 2026	Currently replacing the 1000 series sets.
700 series	702	752	J-TREC	April 2026	Currently replacing the 1000 series sets.

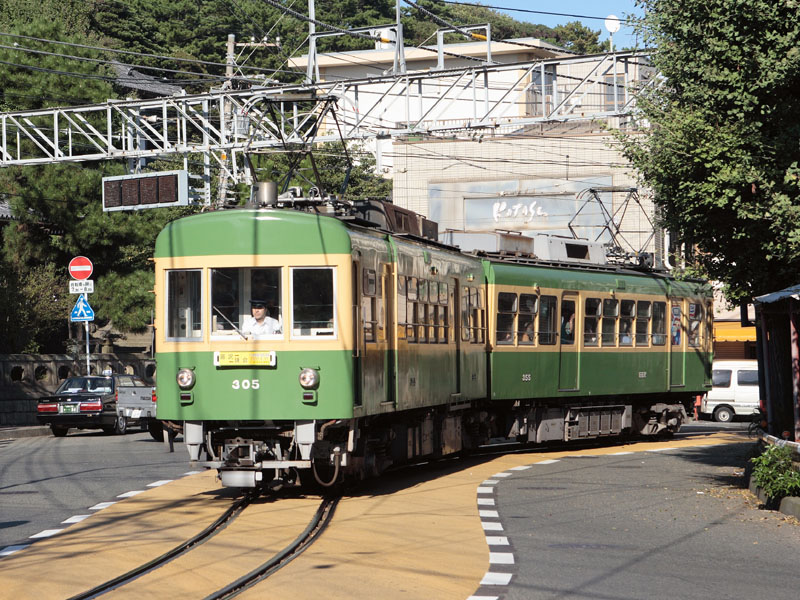
300 series set, the oldest in the fleet, pictured in 2005

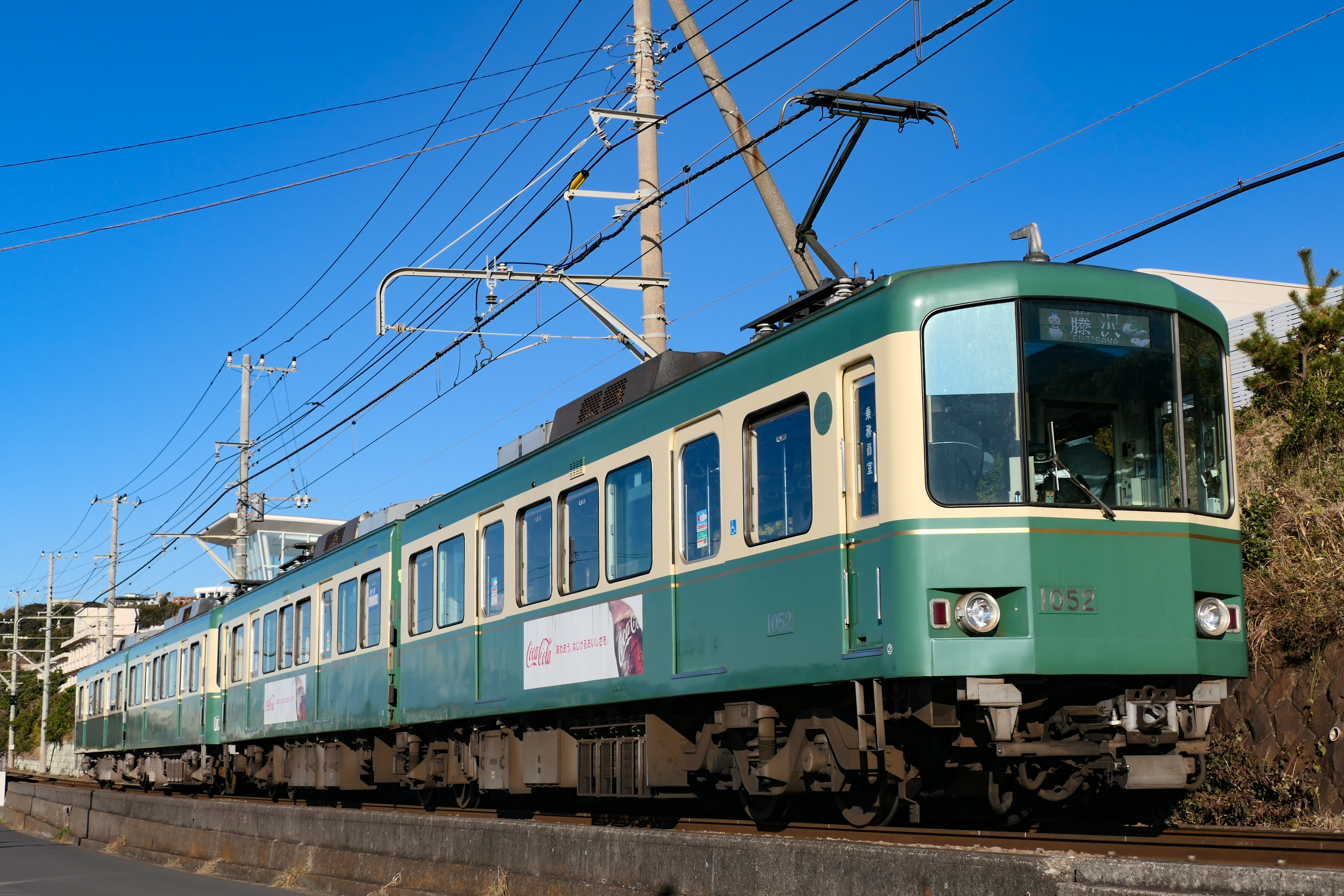
1000 series, pictured in 2020

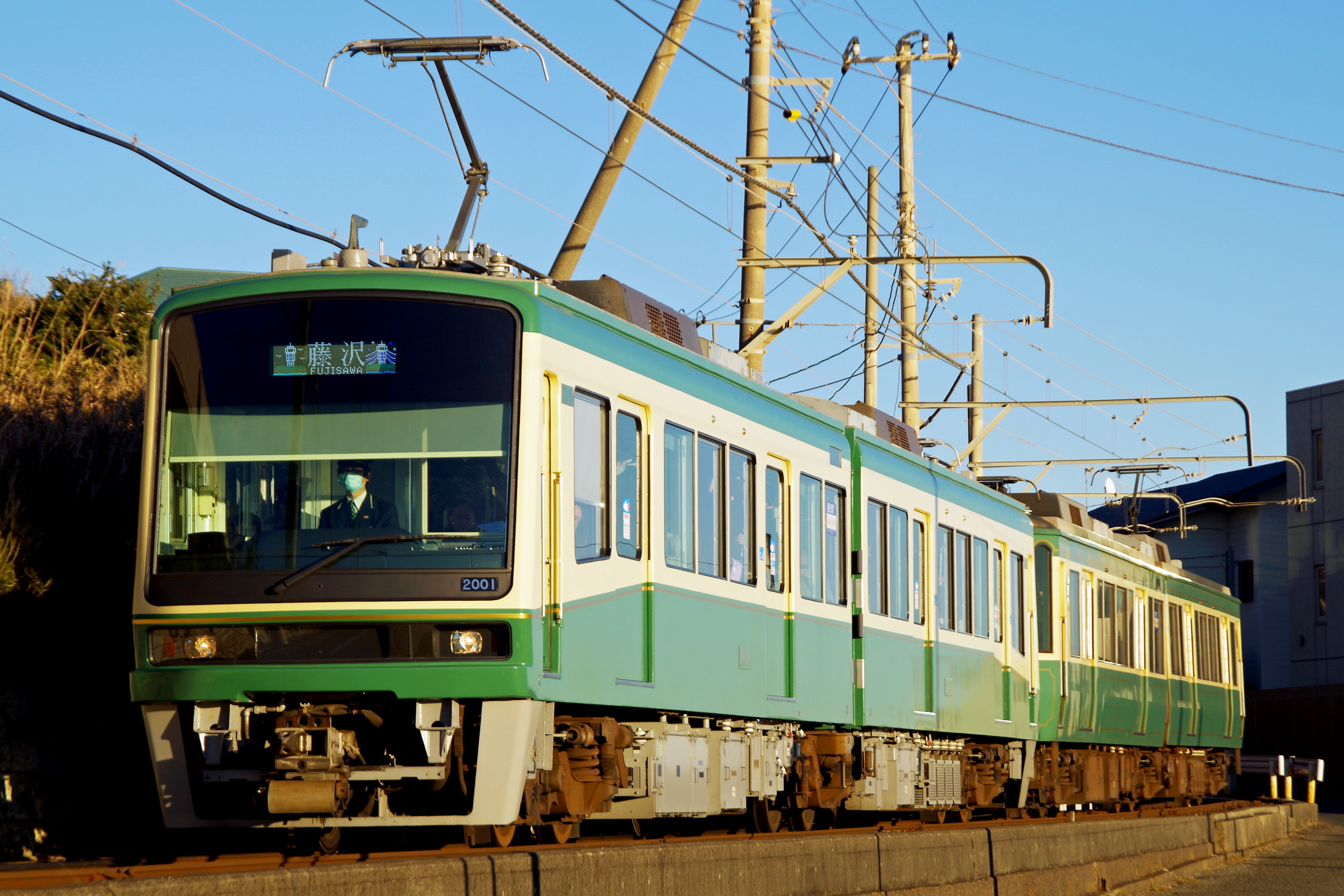
2000 series, pictured in 2017

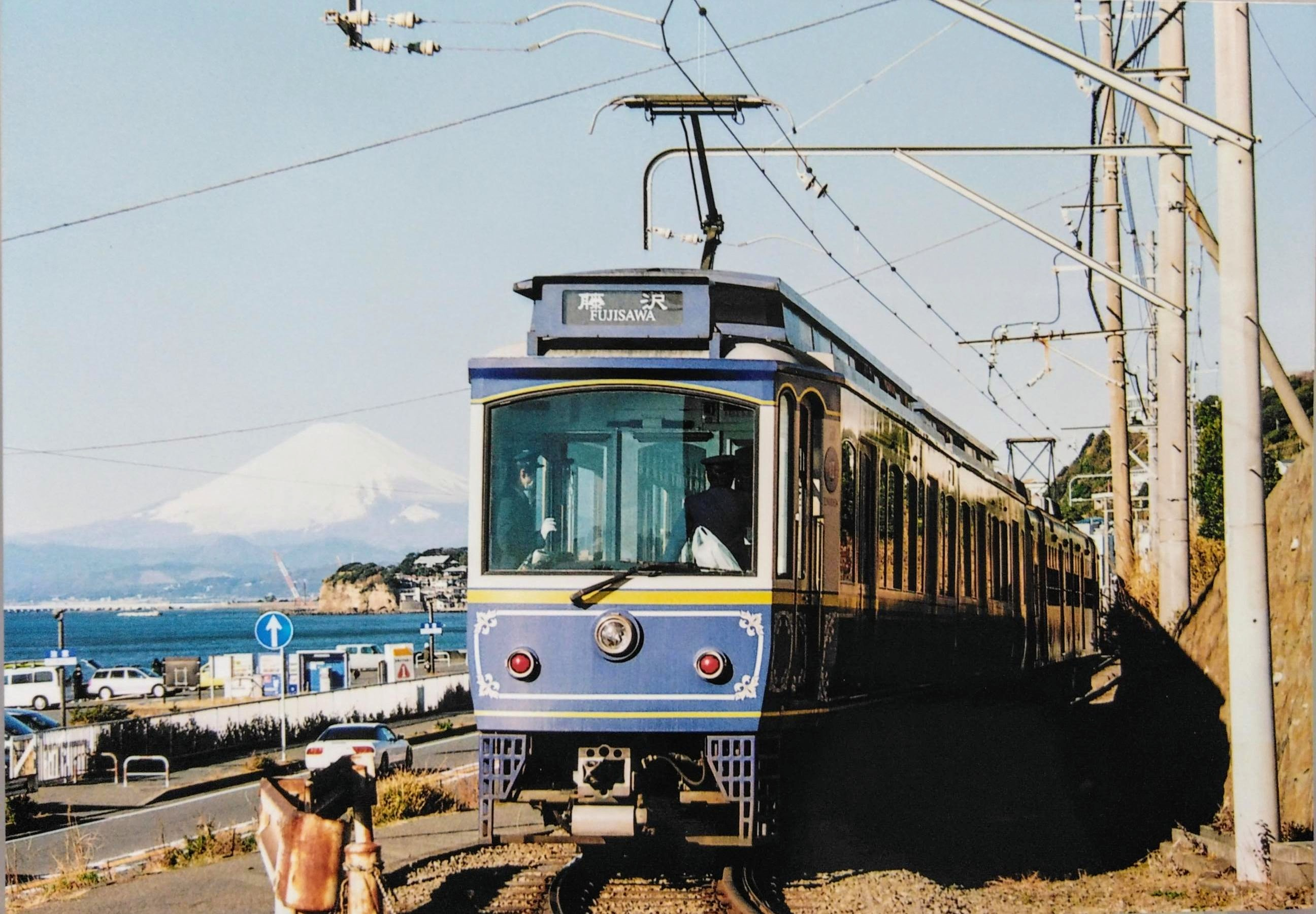
10 series, pictured in 2024

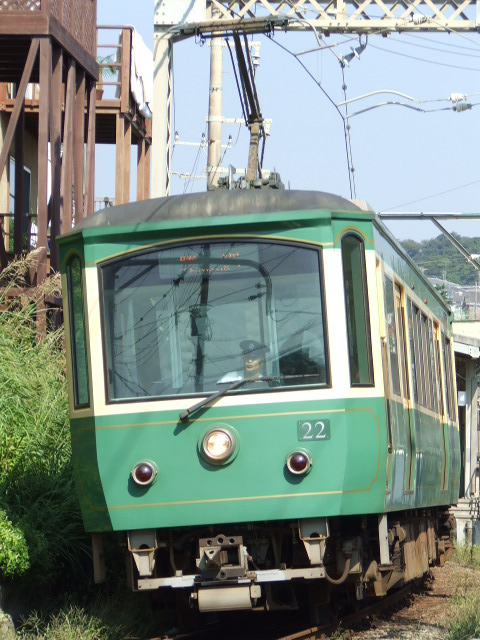
20 series, pictured in 2007

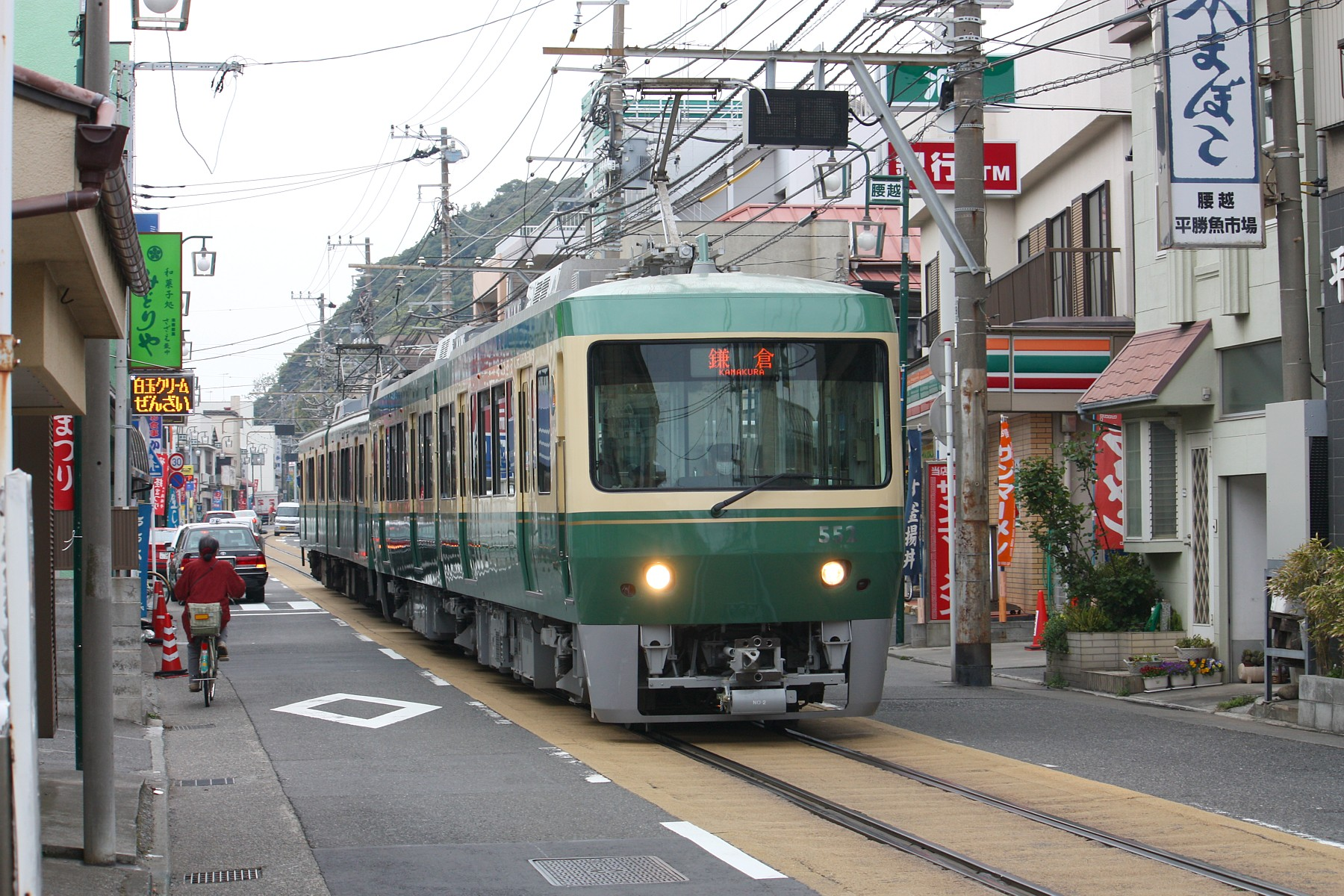
500 series set, pictured in 2008

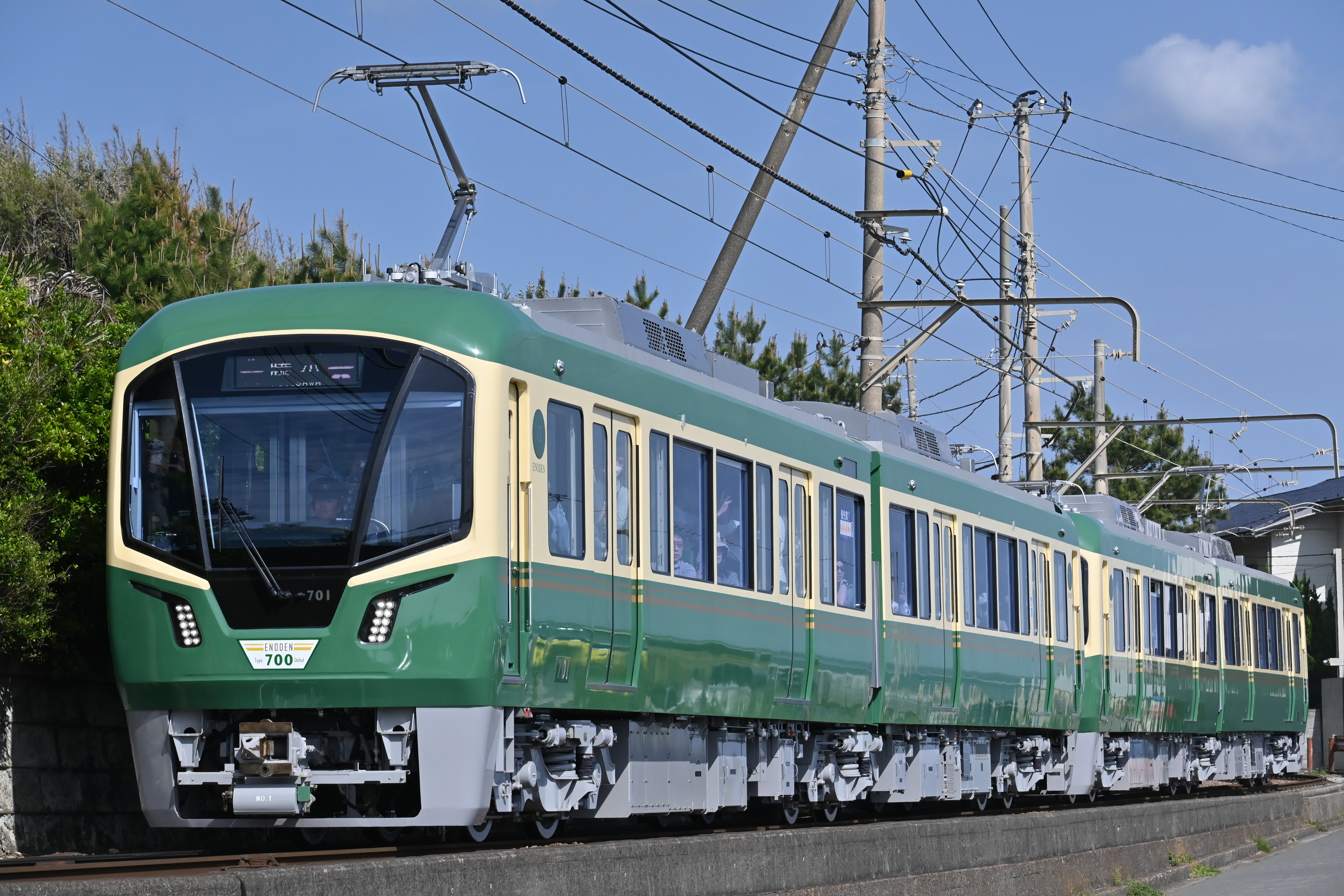
700 series set, pictured in 2026

Several trains, 2024

=== Former rolling stock ===
- 100 series (1931–1980, one car preserved)
- 500 series (original)
- Some 1000 series (1979–2026, car nos. 1001 and 1051)
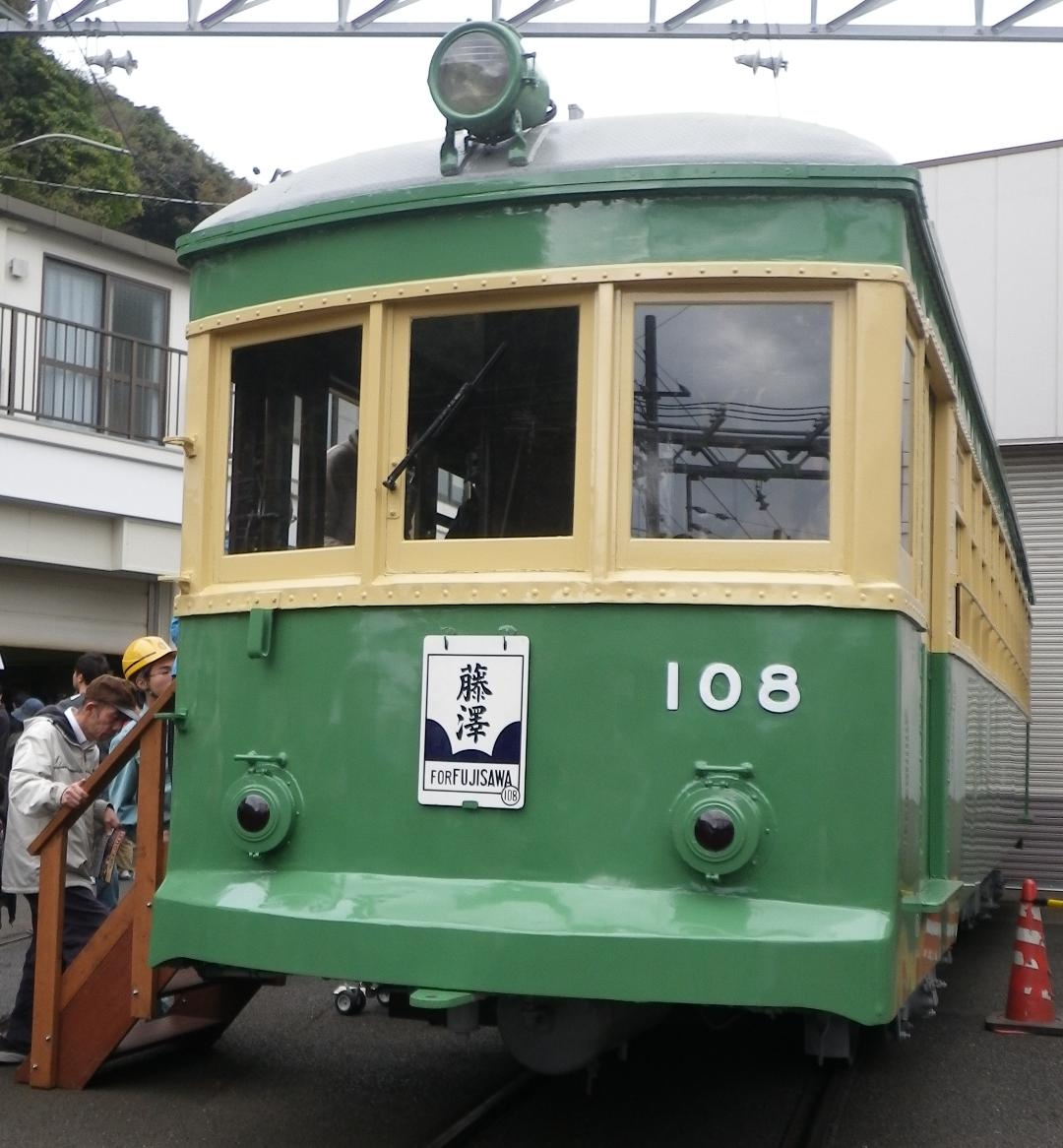
100 series, preserved car pictured in 2010

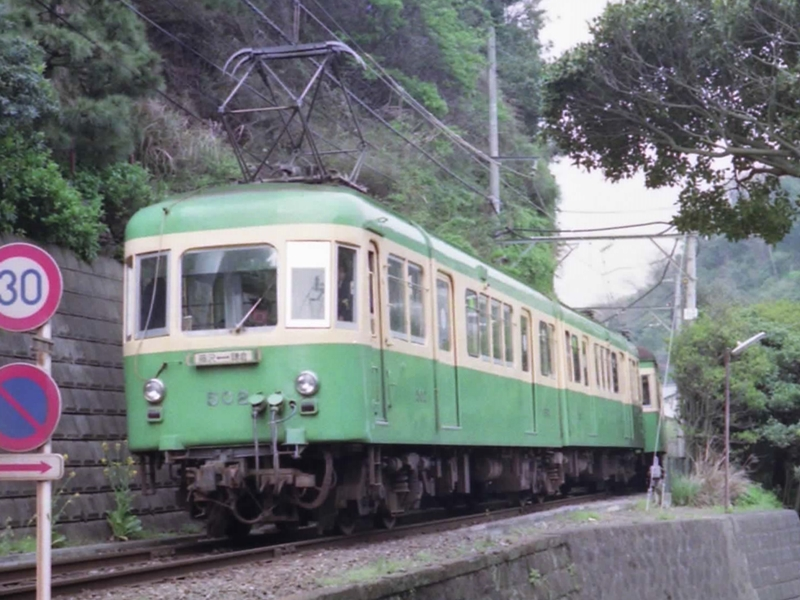
Original 500 series set in April 1992

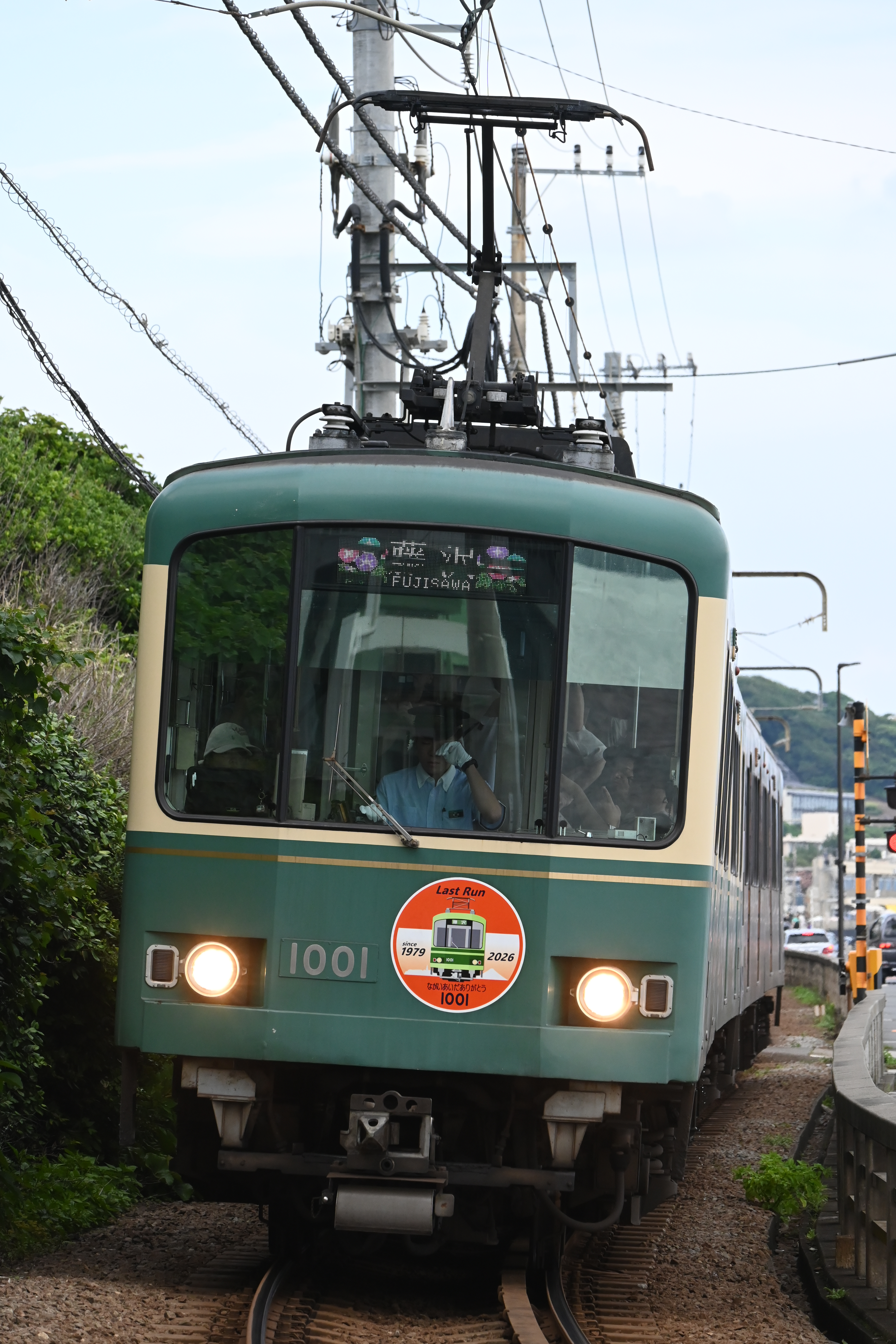
1001 with commemorative headboard in July 2026

== Popular culture ==
=== Music ===
Japanese alternative rock band Asian Kung-Fu Generation's fifth studio album, Surf Bungaku Kamakura (released 2008), had each track named after a stop on the railway line starting with Fujisawa and ending with Kamakura. The band has since announced a continuation of this album for the rest of the stations that did not originally have a song, starting withYanagikōji Parallel Universe releasing as a B-side track in 2022.

=== Film and drama ===
Gokurakuji Station is one of the settings for the 2015 film Our Little Sister.

Netflix series Can This Love Be Translated? which follows the romance between interpreter Joo Ho-jin and actress Cha Mu-hee, was filmed in Enoden Train, Gorakuji Station, and train crossing near Tanaka Barber Shop.

=== Anime ===
The Enoshima Electric Railway and its rolling stock painted in the company's green-and-yellow colours have made numerous appearances in Japanese animated series, including those adapted from manga and light novel series such as:

- Slam Dunk (1993)
- Millennium Actress (2001)
- Sweet Blue Flowers (2009)
- A Channel (2011)
- Tsuritama (2012)
- Tari Tari (2012)
- Ping Pong: The Animation (2014)
- Hanayamata (2014)
- Myriad Colors Phantom World (2016)
- Minami Kamakura High School Girls Cycling Club (2017)
- Anonymous Noise (2017)
- Your Voice -KIMIKOE- (2017)
- Rascal Does Not Dream of Bunny Girl Senpai (2018)
- Super Cub (2021)
- Senpai Is an Otokonoko (2024)
- Watari-kun's ****** Is About to Collapse (2025)
- Anyway, I'm Falling in Love with You (2025)
- The Klutzy Class Monitor and the Girl with the Short Skirt (2026)

=== Video games ===
- Enoden's railway line is simulated its entirety in the train simulator arcade game Densha de Go! Ryojōhen.
