= Ishigami Station =

Railway station in Fujisawa, Kanagawa Prefecture, Japan

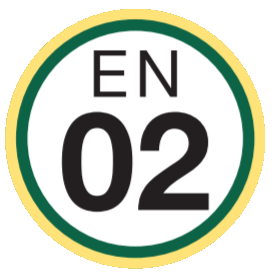
Ishigami Station 石上駅

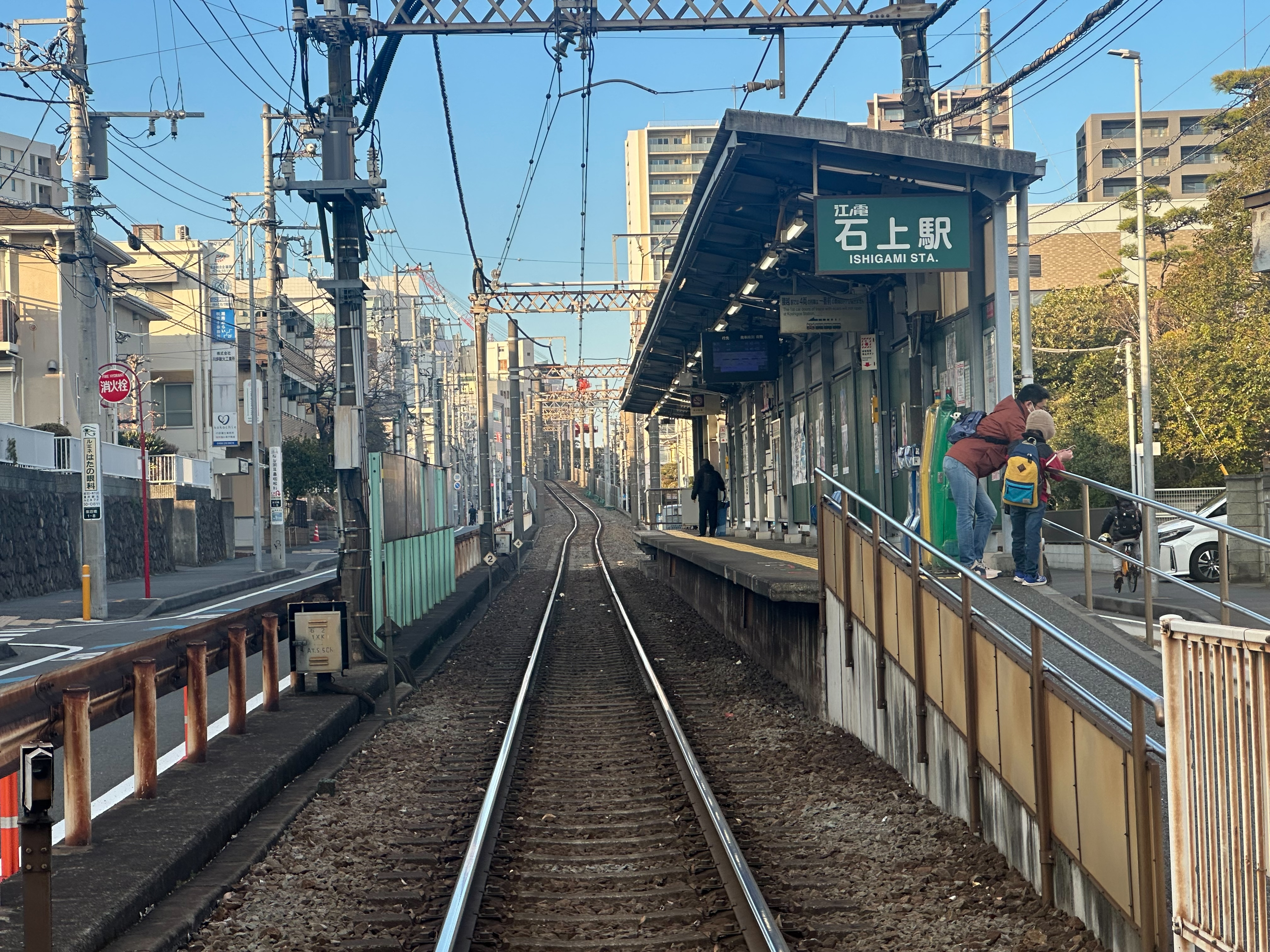
- Enoden Ishigami Station platform, 2025

General information
- Location: 1-9-3 Kugenuma Tachibana; Fujisawa; Japan
- Coordinates: 35°19′57″N 139°29′08″E
- Owner: Enoshima Electric Railway
- Distance: 0.6 km (0.37 mi) from Fujisawa
- Platforms: 1 side platform
- Tracks: 1

Construction
- Structure type: At-grade
- Accessible: Yes

Other information
- Status: Unstaffed
- Station code: EN02

History
- Opened: 1 April 1920
- Former names: Takasago (until 1950)

Passengers
- FY2019: 729 daily

Services
Preceding station	Enoshima Electric Railway	Following station
Fujisawa Terminus	Enoden	Yanagikōji towards Kamakura
Location
- Location within Kanagawa Prefecture Location within Kanto Area Location within Japan

Ishigami Station (Japanese: 石上駅, Hepburn: Ishigami-eki) is a railway station on the Enoshima Electric Railway (Enoden) located in the city of Fujisawa, Japan.

== Service ==
Ishigami Station is served by the Enoshima Electric Railway Main Line and is located 0.6 kilometers (0.37 mi) from the line's terminus at Fujisawa Station.

The station consists of a single side platform serving one track used for bi-directional traffic. The station is unstaffed.

== History ==
Ishigami Station was opened on 1 April 1920 as Takasuna Station (高砂駅, Takasuna-eki). From 1902–1944, an "Ishigami Signal Stop" existed to the north of the present station. This stop, as well as Takasuna Station were closed in 1944 during World War II. Takasuna Station reopened in 1950 under the name "Ishigami Station".

Station numbering was introduced to the Enoshima Electric Railway January 2014 with Ishigami being assigned station numbers EN02.

In 2023 the station was one of six stations redecorated with painted murals as part of the “Art Station” initiative connected with the Enoshima International Art Festival.

== Passenger statistics ==
In fiscal 2019, the station was used by an average of 729 passengers daily, making it the least used of any of the Enoden stations

The passenger figures for previous years are as shown below.

Fiscal year	daily average
2005	561
2010	465
2015	704

== Surrounding area ==
- Fujisawa Joint Government Building
- Fujisawa City Concert Hall
- Prince Chichibu Memorial Gymnasium
- Fujisawa Medical Center
- Fujisawa City South Civic Library
