= Hase Station (Kanagawa) =

Railway station in Kamakura, Kanagawa Prefecture, Japan

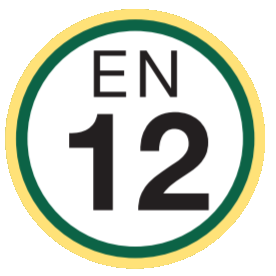
Hase Station 長谷駅

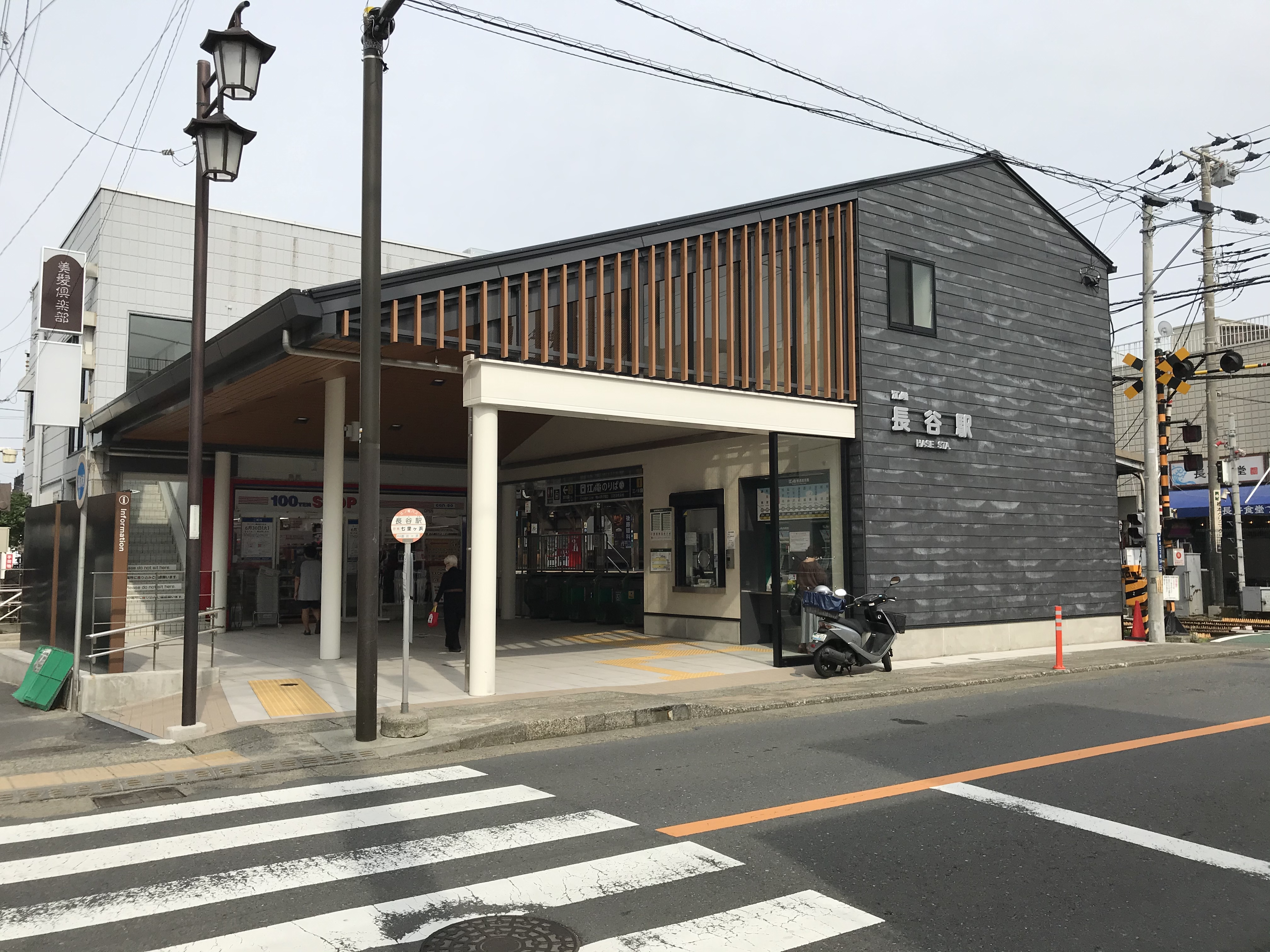
- Hase Station, June 2020

General information
- Location: 2-14-10 Hase; Kamakura; Japan
- Coordinates: 35°18′41″N 139°32′11″E
- Owner: Enoshima Electric Railway
- Distance: 8.3 km (5.2 mi) from Fujisawa
- Platforms: 2 side platforms
- Tracks: 1

Construction
- Structure type: At-grade
- Accessible: Yes

Other information
- Status: Staffed (all day)
- Station code: EN12

History
- Opened: 16 August 1907
- Rebuilt: 2020

Passengers
- FY2019: 9,276 daily

Services
Preceding station	Enoshima Electric Railway	Following station
Gokurakuji towards Fujisawa	Enoden	Yuigahama towards Kamakura
Location
- Location within Kanagawa Prefecture Location within Japan

Hase Station (Japanese: 長谷駅, Hepburn: Hase-eki) is a railway station on the Enoshima Electric Railway (Enoden) located in the Hase neighborhood of Kamakura, Japan.

== Service ==
Hase Station is served by the Enoshima Electric Railway Main Line and is located 8.3 kilometers (5.2 mi) from the line's terminus at Fujisawa Station.

The station consists of two opposed side platforms serving two ground-level tracks. The Kamakura-bound side of the station contains a staffed ticket office, coin lockers, and a Tully's Coffee outlet. Within the paid area, the station has a restroom. The station is staffed during all operating hours, with the ticket office open from 10:00 to 19:00.

== History ==
Hase Station was opened on 16 August 1907. The current station building dates from April 2020.

Station numbering was introduced to the Enoshima Electric Railway January 2014 with Hase being assigned station number EN12.

== Passenger statistics ==
In fiscal 2019, the station was used by an average of 9,276 passengers daily, making it the 4th used of the 15 Enoden stations.

The average passenger figures for previous years (boarding passengers only) are as shown below.

Fiscal year	daily average
2005	3,275
2010	3,412
2015	5,734

== Surrounding area ==
Hase Station is located close to several of Kamakura's major tourist attractions, including the Kamakura Daibutsu and Hase-dera.
