= Kamakura Station =

Railway station in Kamakura, Kanagawa Prefecture, Japan

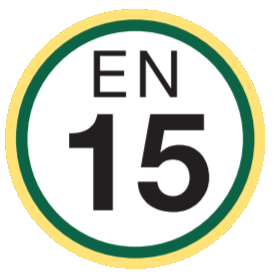
JO07 JS07 Kamakura Station 鎌倉駅

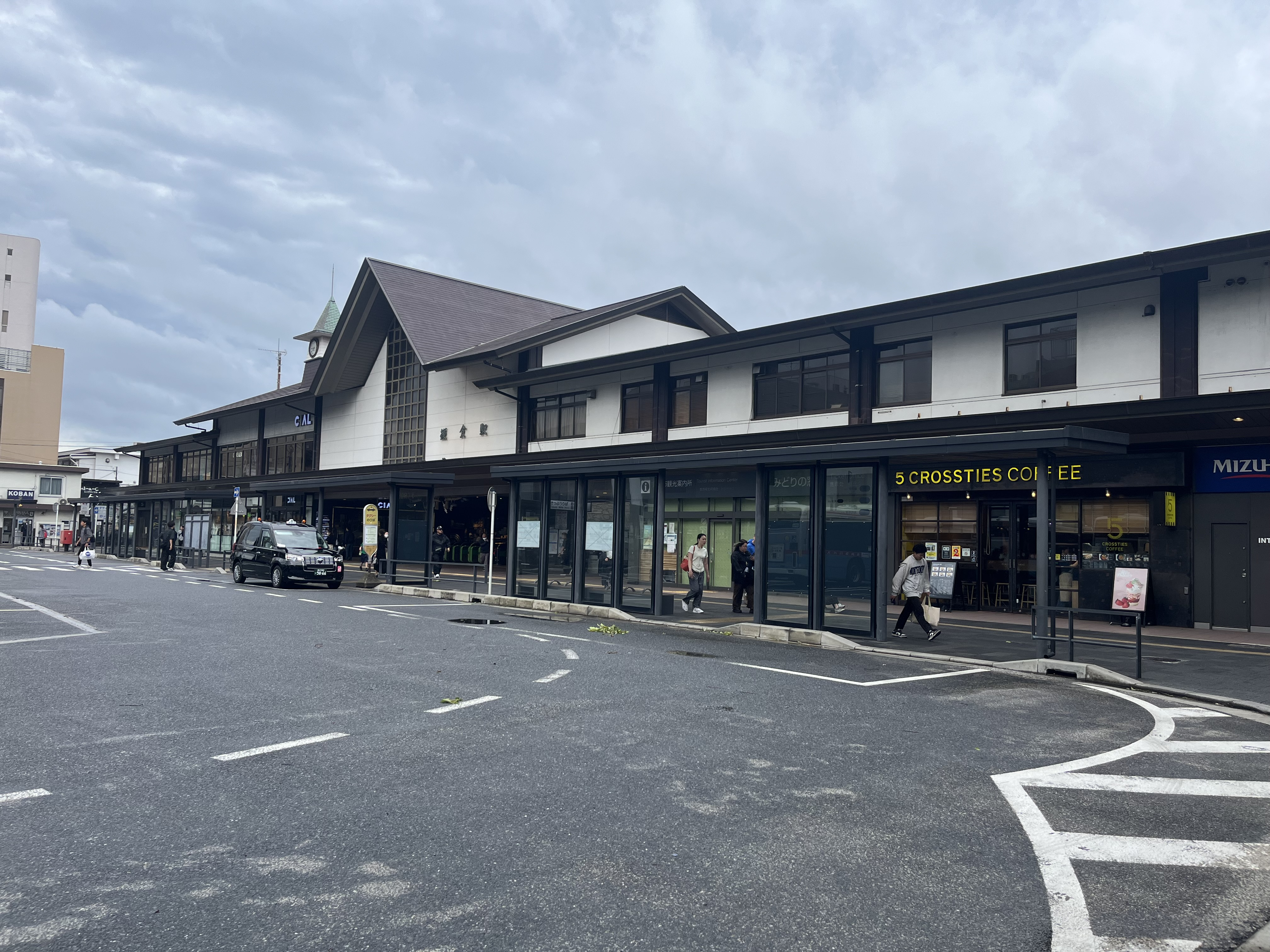
- Kamakura Station east entrance

General information
- Location: 1-1-1 Komachi; Kamakura; Japan
- Coordinates: 35°19′8.66″N 139°33′1.57″E
- Distance: Yokosuka Line: 53.9 km (33.5 mi) from Tokyo; Enoshima Electric Railway: 10 km (6.2 mi) from Fujisawa
- Train operators: JR East; Enoshima Electric Railway
- Connections: Bus terminal

Construction
- Structure type: At-grade

Other information
- Station code: Yokosuka Line: JO07; Shonan-Shinjuku Line: JS07; Enoshima Electric Railway: EN15

History
- Opened: 16 June 1889

Passengers
- FY2008: 40,374 daily (JR East)

Services
Preceding station	JR East	Following station
Zushi JO06 towards Kurihama	Yokosuka Line	Kita-Kamakura JO08 towards Tokyo
Zushi JS06 Terminus	Shōnan–Shinjuku Line Rapid Local	Kita-Kamakura JS08 towards Utsunomiya
Preceding station	Enoshima Electric Railway	Following station
Wadazuka towards Fujisawa	Enoden	Terminus
Location

Kamakura Station (Japanese: 鎌倉駅, Hepburn: Kamakura-eki) is a railway station on the Yokosuka Line in Kamakura, Kanagawa, Japan, operated by East Japan Railway Company (JR East).

== Lines ==
Kamakura Station is served by the Yokosuka Line and Shōnan-Shinjuku Line. It is located 4.5 km (2.8 mi) from the junction at Ōfuna Station, and 53.9 km (33.5 mi) from Tokyo Station. It is also the terminal station for the Enoshima Electric Railway, whose station is adjacent and located 10 kilometres (6.2 mi) from the line's origin at Fujisawa.

== Station layout ==
=== JR East Station ===
JR Kamakura Station has a single island platform connected to the station building by two underpasses. Beside the two main lines there is also one additional line where trains can stop. Because the platform is built on a hill, its elevation is higher than the ticket gates and Enoden platform.

Because the station serves a popular tourist area, there are many extra trains at weekends and holidays. However, in spite of the extra side line for trains to stop in, trains cannot change direction at this station, so many trains meant to serve this station have to run between Zushi and Tamachi Depot. In the evening, passenger trains also run from Tamachi Depot to Zushi, then back to Kamakura.

In most areas with stairs there are elevators and escalators. There are also two automatic vending machines for Green car (first class) tickets for use with Suica on the platform.

At the station's east exit there were previously several shops, especially restaurants. However, this area was rebuilt as Ekisuto Kamakura (エキスト鎌倉), a shopping facility which opened on 31 October 2007. Besides a convenience store and a Kamakura tourist information center, the first floor consists entirely of eateries. There is a "Midori no Madoguchi" staffed ticket counter the east entrance, which operates during the hours 7:00 to 20:00.

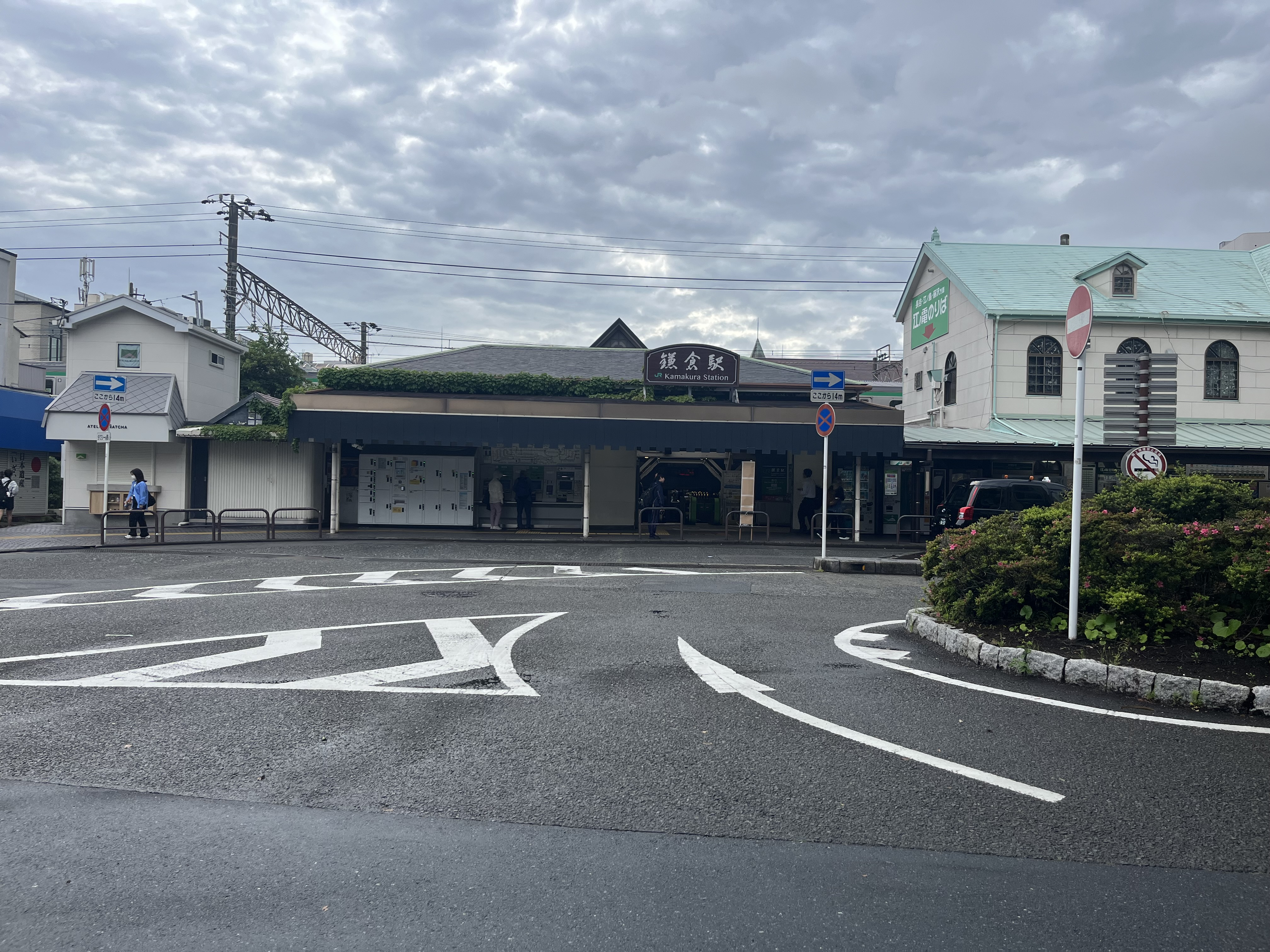
West Exit

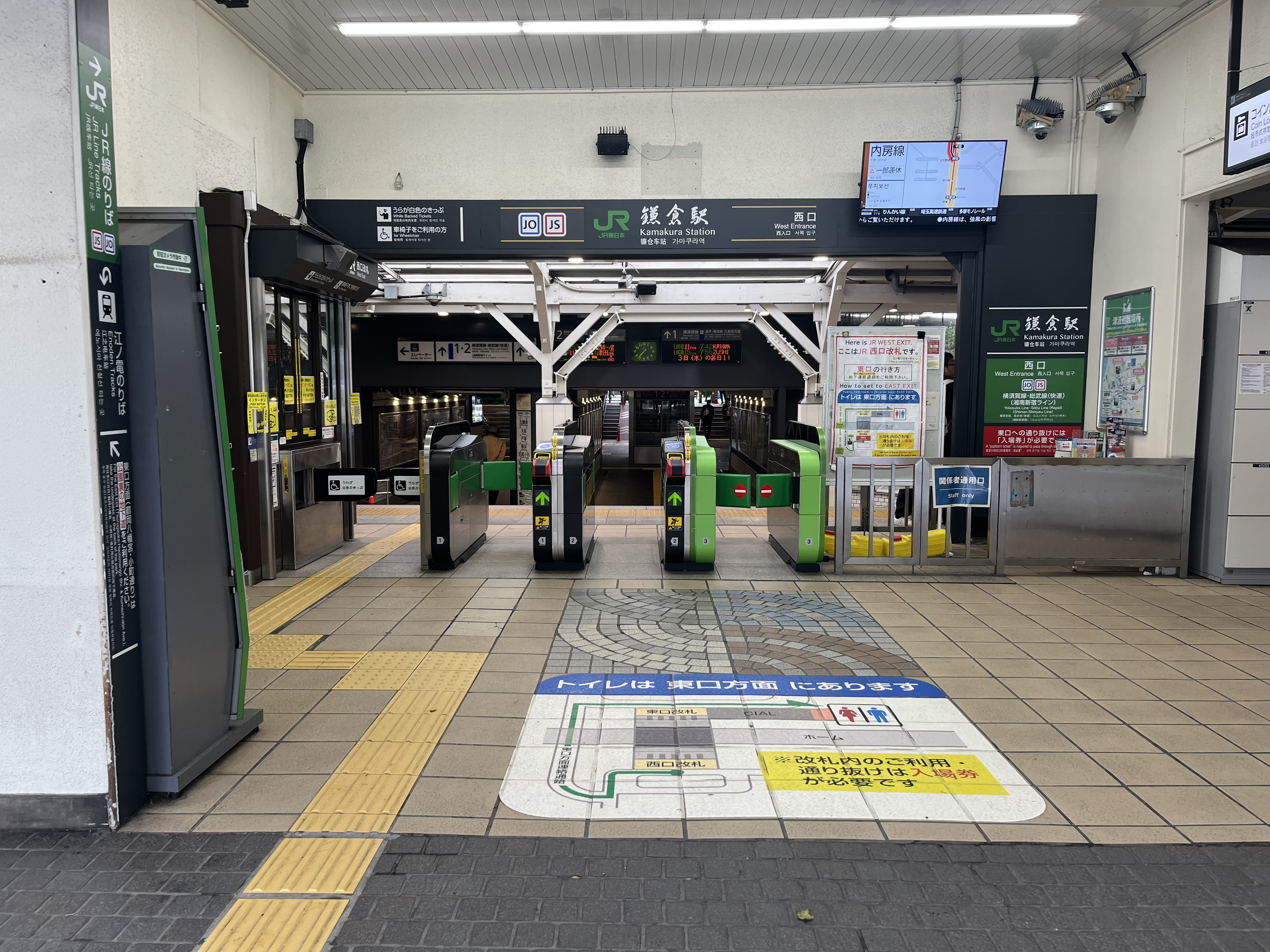
West Ticket Gate

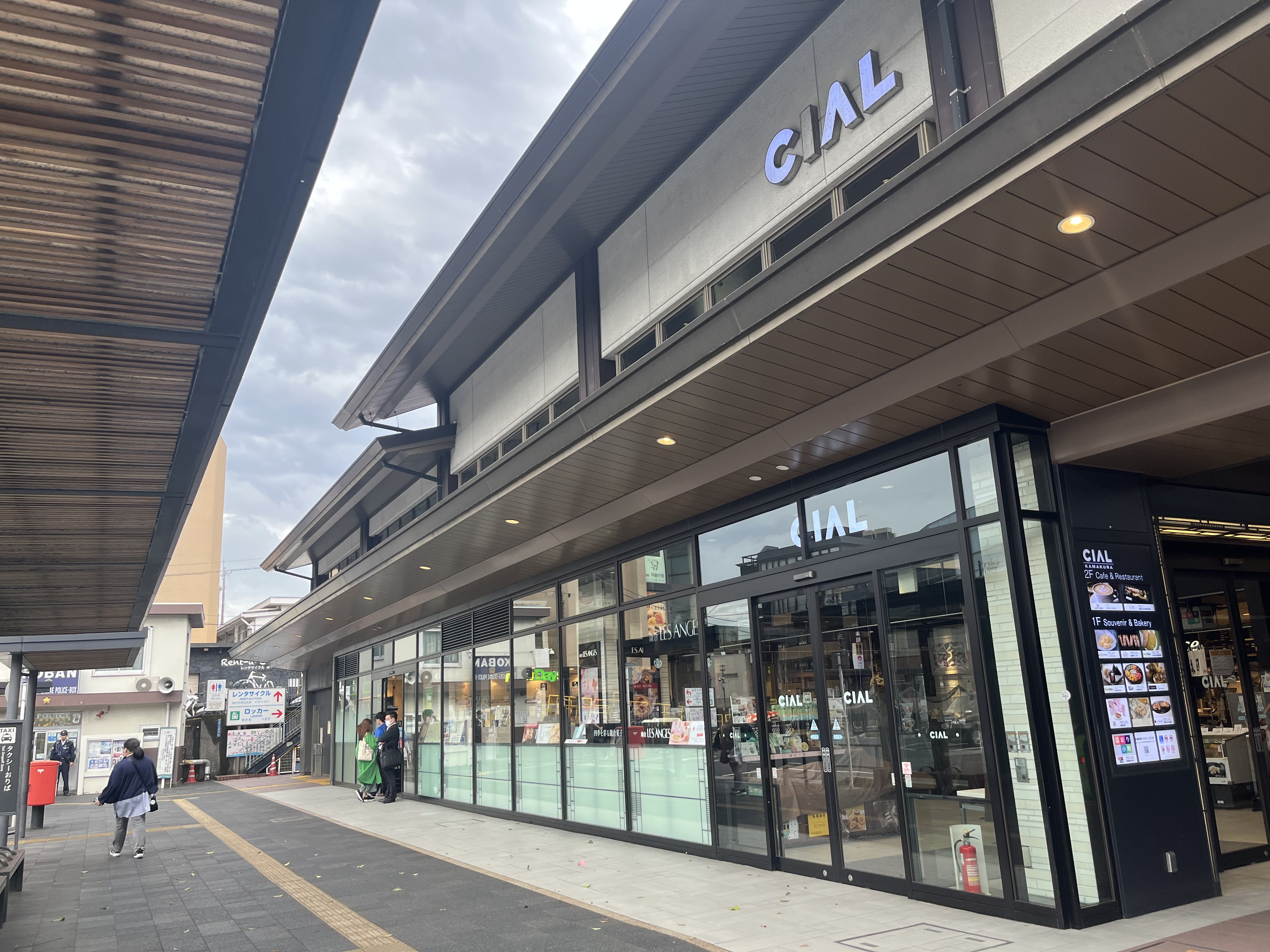
CIAL Kamakura

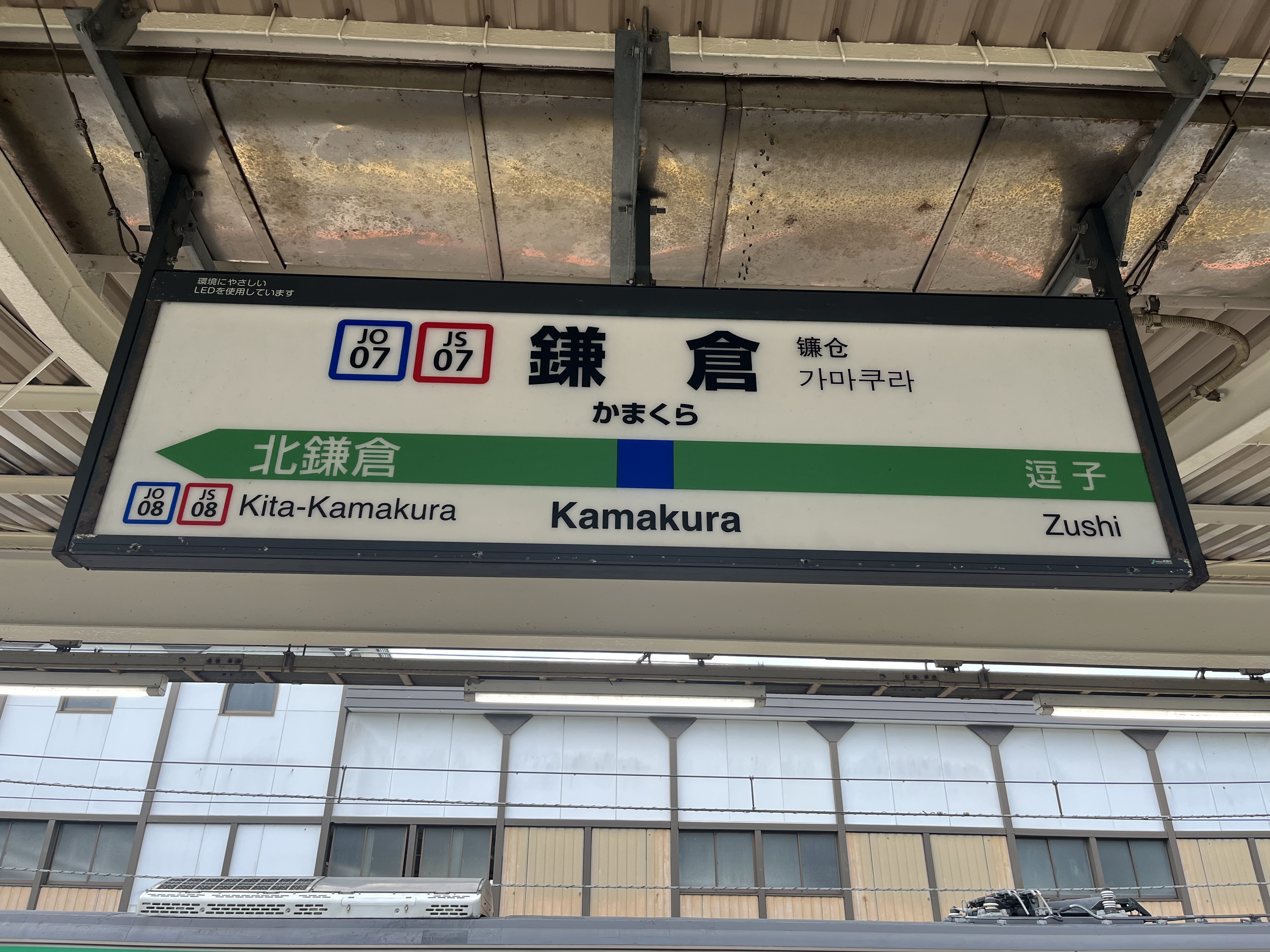
Station name sign

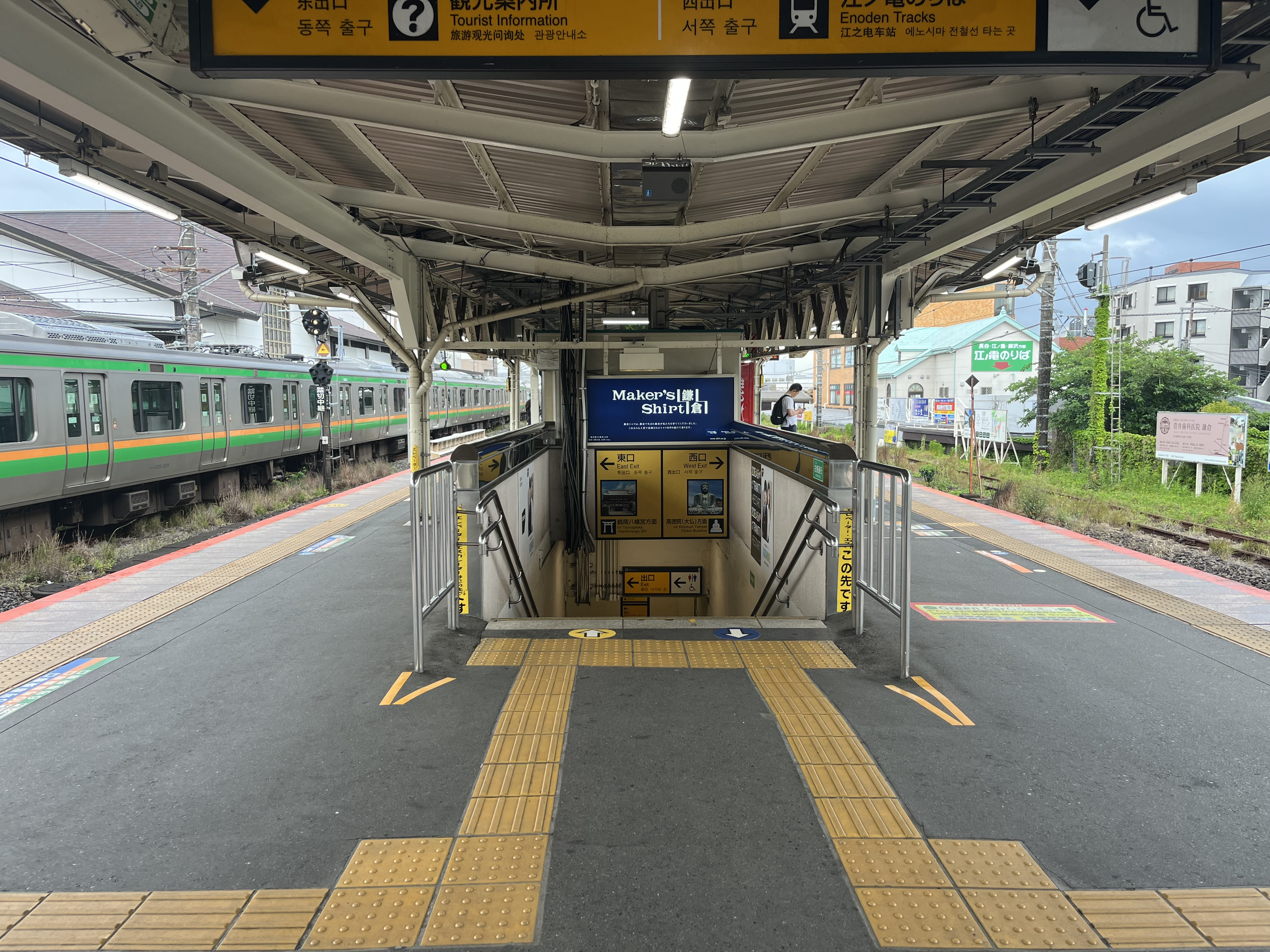
platform

=== Enoshima Electric Railway Station ===
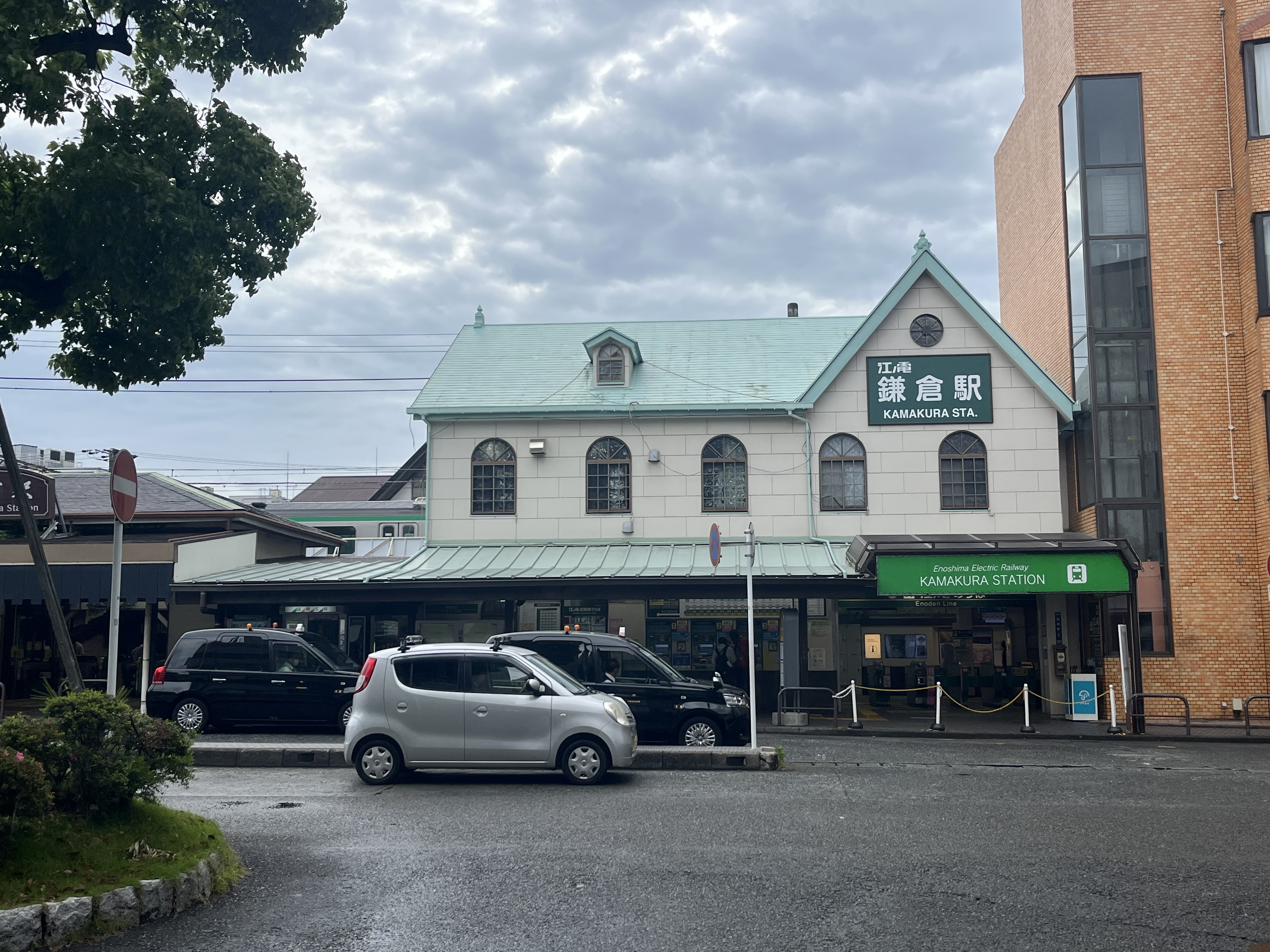
Enoden Kamakura Station

The Enoshima Electric Railway (Enoden) has a ground-level bay platform around two tracks. The platforms are numbered in coordination with the JR lines, so that Enoden uses lines designated as 3 through 5, the signs of which are controlled by machine, usually displaying only 3 and 4. Line 5 is used only for the early morning train that departs at 5:47. During this time, there is already a train in line 3, and in order to change the order of trains on the tracks (that of two-car and four-car trains) line 5 is used. In the periods around New Year, Golden Week, and other busy times, a special, staggered schedule using the two lines 3 and 5.

An entrance ticket at other Enoden stations is 190 yen (as of September 2012), but in order to match JR, which shares the Kamakura station, the ticket is 130 yen at Kamakura station, although this ticket can only be used on the Enoden side.

At the time of introduction of Pasmo, automatic ticket gates were installed in both Kamakura Station and Fujisawa Station.

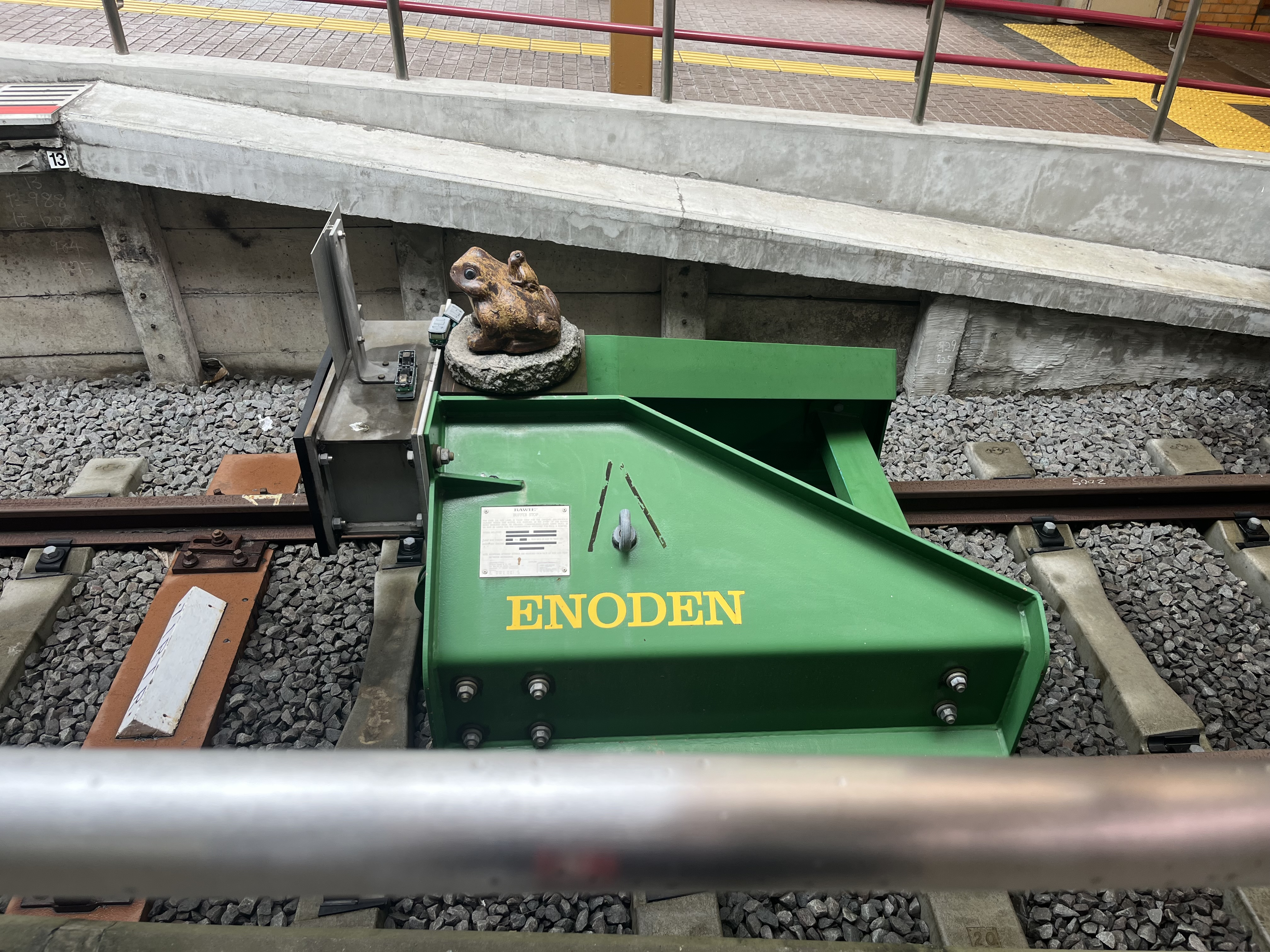
The buffer stop and the parent-and-child frog statues at Track 3.

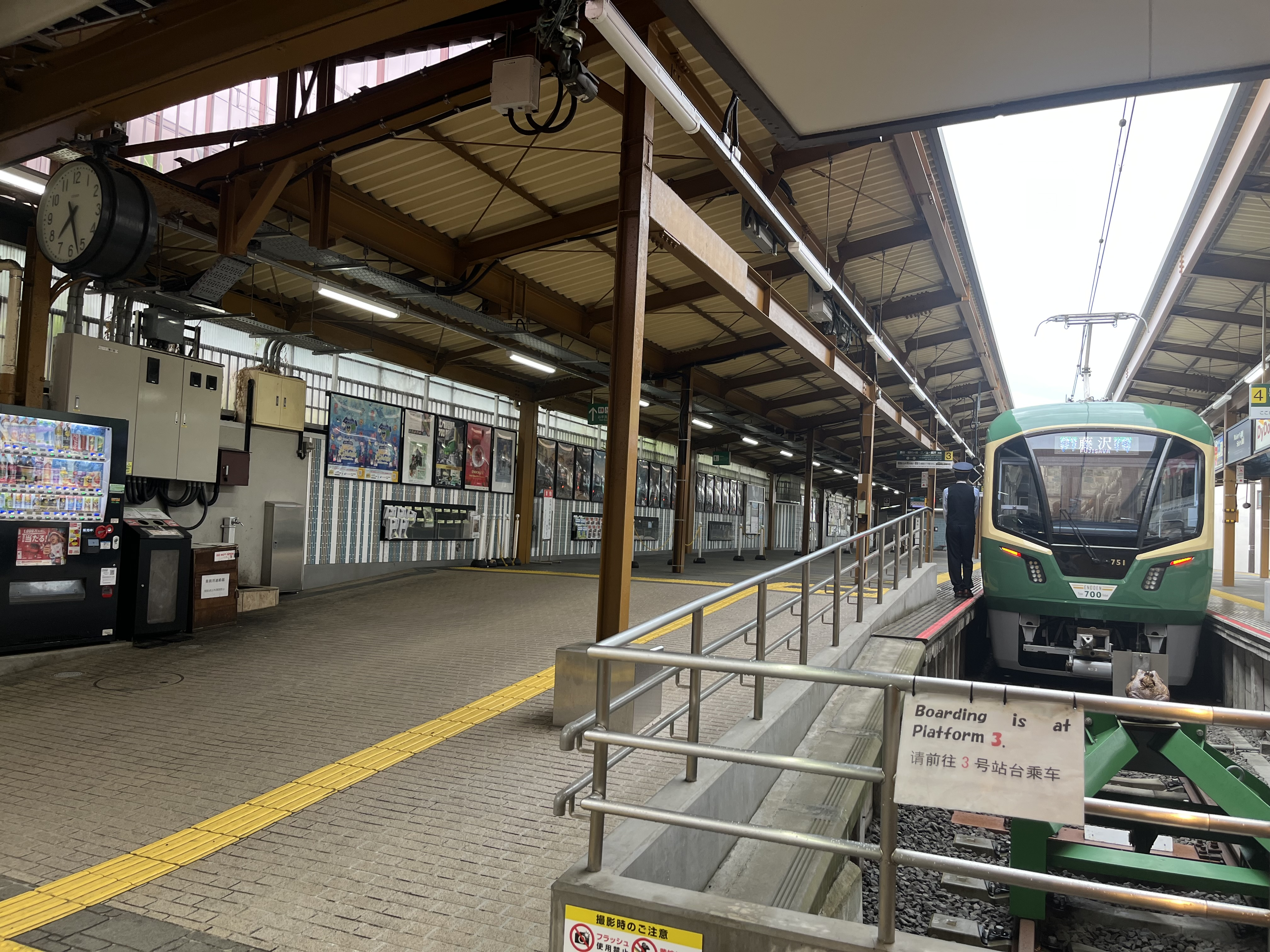
Premises

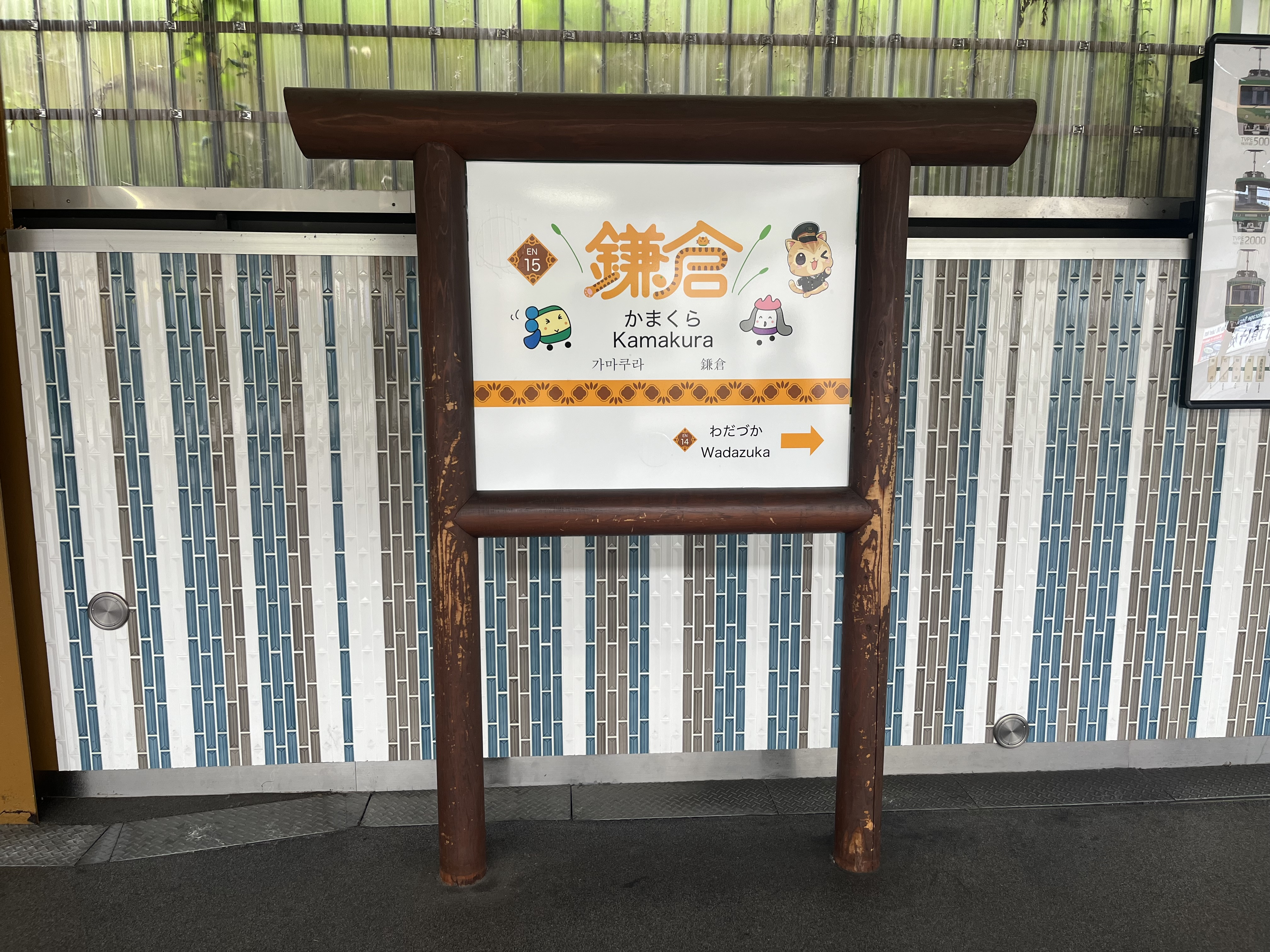
Station name sign

=== JR platforms ===
1	Yokosuka Line	for Zushi, Yokosuka, and Kurihama
1	Shōnan-Shinjuku Line	for Zushi
2	Yokosuka Line	for Ōfuna, Yokohama, Tokyo, Chiba; Narita Line for Narutō / Narita Airport (via Chiba); Uchibō Line for Kimitsu (via Chiba)
2	Shōnan-Shinjuku Line	for Ōfuna, Yokohama, Shinjuku, Ōmiya, and Utsunomiya

=== Enoshima Electric Railway platforms ===
3	■ Enoshima Electric Railway	for Hase, Enoshima, and Fujisawa
4	■ Enoshima Electric Railway	Alighting passengers only
5	■ Enoshima Electric Railway	for Hase, Enoshima, and Fujisawa (early morning and holidays only)

== Bus service ==
=== East exit ===
==== Kamakura station bus terminal ====
Bus stop number 1

No.	Via	Destination	Company	Office
F1	Kotokuin・Daibutsumae	Fujisawa Station Minamiguchi	Enoden Bus	Shonan
K1	Kotokuin・Daibutsumae	Kikyoyama	Enoden Bus	Shonan
K3	Kotokuin・Daibutsumae	Shonanshako	Enoden Bus	Shonan

Bus stop number 2

No.	Via	Destination	Company	Office
airport bus	Non stop	Haneda Airport	Keihin Kyuko Bus	Kamakura
A21	Ofuna Station	Kamiooka Station	Enoden Bus	Yokohama
N2	Joraku-ji	Ofuna Station	Enoden Bus	Kamakura
K4	Ofuna Station	Hongodai Station	Enoden Bus	Kamakura
K5	Hase Station	Shichirigahama	Enoden Bus	Shonan
airport bus	Non stop	Haneda Airport	Enoden Bus	
expressway bus		Sakaishi Station	Nankai Bus	

Bus stop number 3

No.	Via	Destination	Company	Office
鎌30	Midorigaokairiguchi	Shinzushi Station	Keihin Kyuko Bus	Kamakura
鎌31		Midorigaokairiguchi	Keihin Kyuko Bus	Kamakura
sightseeing bus	circular-route	Kamakura Station	Enoden Bus	Shonan

Bus stop number 4

No.	Via	Destination	Company	Office
鎌20		Kamakura-gu	Keihin Kyuko Bus	Kamakura

Bus stop number 5

No.	Via	Destination	Company	Office
鎌23	Kamakuragomeisui	Kamakura Gakuen Seimon-mae	Keihin Kyuko Bus	Kamakura
鎌24	Kamakura Gakuen Seimon-mae	Kanazawa-hakkei Station	Keihin Kyuko Bus	Kamakura
鎌36	circular-route	Kamakura Station	Keihin Kyuko Bus	Kamakura

Bus stop number 6

No.	Via	Destination	Company	Office
鎌2	Daibutsumae	Kajiwara	Keihin Kyuko Bus	Kamakura
鎌3	Daibutsumae・Fujimidai(circular-route)	Kamakura Station	Keihin Kyuko Bus	Kamakura
鎌4	Daibutsumae	Kamakurayama	Keihin Kyuko Bus	Kamakura
鎌5	Daibutsumae・Kamakurayama	Suwagaya	Keihin Kyuko Bus	Kamakura
鎌6	Daibutsumae・Kamakurayama	Enoshima	Keihin Kyuko Bus	Kamakura
船7	Daibutsumae・Kajiwaraguchi	Ofuna Station	Keihin Kyuko Bus	Kamakura
船8	Daibutsumae・Kajiwaraguchi・Kajiwara	Ofuna Station	Keihin Kyuko Bus	Kamakura
船9	Daibutsumae・Kamakurayama	Ofuna Station	Keihin Kyuko Bus	Kamakura

Bus stop number 7

No.	Via	Destination	Company	Office
鎌11	Kaiganbashi(circular-route)	Kamakura Station	Keihin Kyuko Bus	Kamakura
鎌12	Kuhonji(circular-route)	Kamakura Station	Keihin Kyuko Bus	Kamakura
鎌40	Kotsubo	Zushi Station	Keihin Kyuko Bus	Kamakura
鎌41		Kotsubo	Keihin Kyuko Bus	Kamakura

=== West Exit ===
==== Kamakura Shiyakusyo-mae bus stop ====
No.	Via	Destination	Company	Office
K6	Yakumojinja	Kikyoyama	Enoden Bus	Shonan
鎌50	Yakumojinja	Yamanoue Rotary	Keihin Kyuko Bus	Kamakura
鎌51	Yakumojinja	Kamakura Chuo Koen	Keihin Kyuko Bus	Kamakura

== History ==
Kamakura Station opened on 16 June 1889 as a station on a spur line from Ōfuna on the Japanese Government Railways (JGR), the pre-war predecessor to the Japan National Railways (JNR) to serve the Yokosuka Naval Arsenal and related Imperial Japanese Navy facilities at Yokosuka. This line was renamed the Yokosuka Line in October 1909. The terminus of the Enoshima Electric Railway was relocated to Kamakura Station on 1 March 1949. All freight operations were stopped in 1962. The station building was rebuilt in October 1984. The station came under the management of JR East upon the privatization of the Japanese National Railways (JNR) on 1 April 1987.

Station numbering was introduced to the Enoshima Electric Railway January 2014 with Kamakura being assigned station number EN15. The JR East platforms received station numbers in 2016 with Kamakura being assigned station numbers JO07 for the Yokosuka line and JS07 for the Shonan-Shinjuku line.
