= List of dams in Kanagawa Prefecture =

The following is a list of dams in Kanagawa Prefecture, Japan.

== List ==
Name	Location	Opened	Height (metres)	Image
Doshi Dam		1955	32.8	
Honzawa Dam		1965	73	
Ishigoya Dam		2000	34.5	
Iizumi Intake Weir				
Kurokura Dam				
Miho Dam		1978	95	
Miyagase Dam		2000	156	
Numamoto Dam		1943	34.5	
Ohmatazawa Dam		1917	18.7	
Sagami Dam		1947	58.4	
Sagamihara Chindenti Dam		1954	19.5	
Shiroyama Dam		1965	75	

== See also ==
- Media related to Dams in Kanagawa prefecture at Wikimedia Commons
