= Shiroyama Dam =

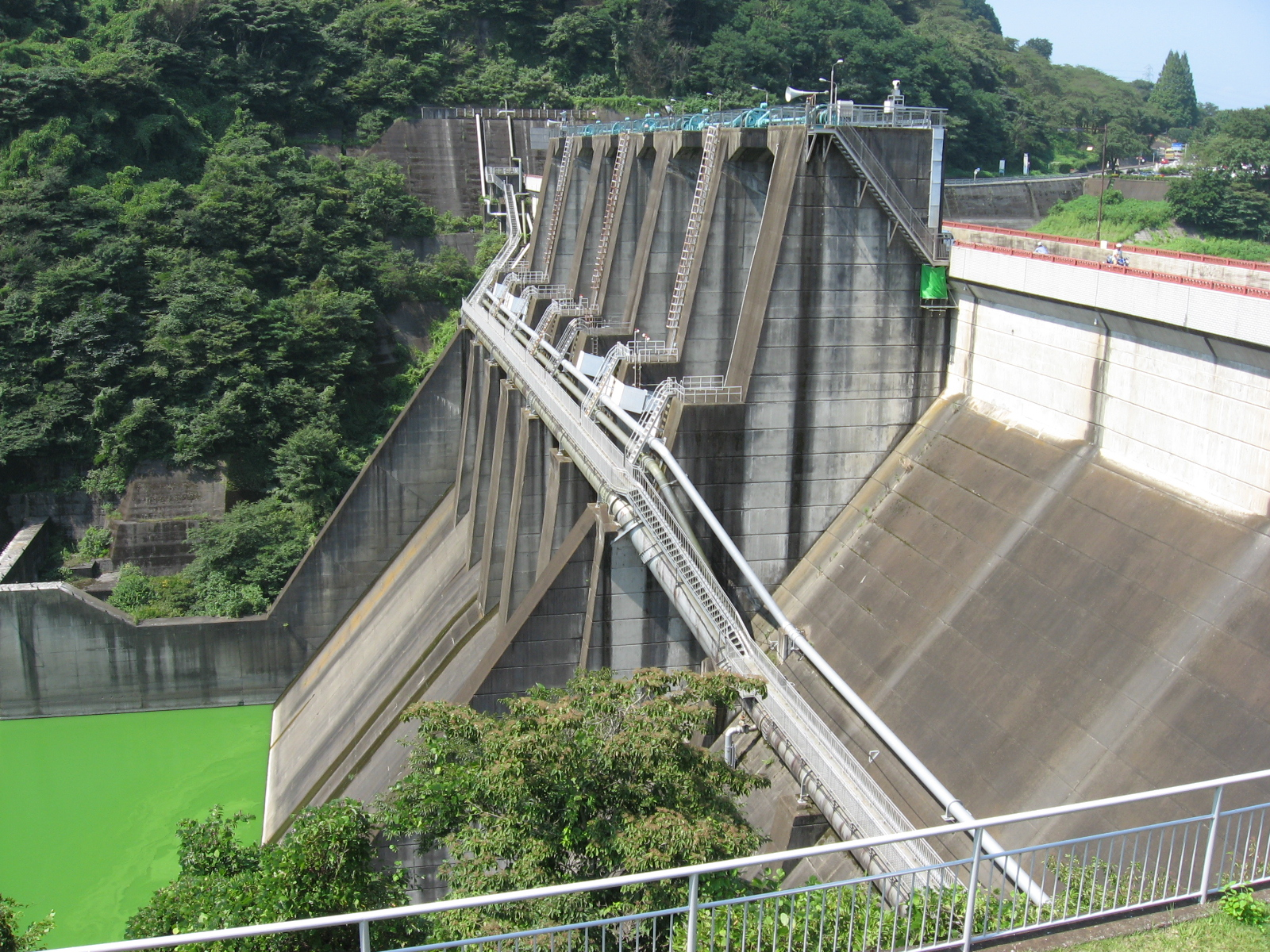
- Official name: 城山ダム
- Location: Kanagawa Prefecture, Japan
- Coordinates: 35°35′09″N 139°17′22″E
- Construction began: 1960
- Opening date: 1965
- Operator(s): Kanagawa Prefecture

Dam and spillways
- Type of dam: Gravity
- Impounds: Sagami River
- Height: 75 m (246 ft)
- Length: 265 m (869 ft)

Reservoir
- Creates: Lake Tsukui
- Total capacity: 62,300,000 m^{3} (2.20×10^{9} cu ft)
- Catchment area: 1,201.3 km^{2} (463.8 sq mi)
- Surface area: 247 hectares

The Shiroyama Dam (城山ダム, Shiroyama damu) is a multi-purpose dam on the main stream Sagami River in Sagamihara, Kanagawa Prefecture on the island of Honshū, Japan.

== History ==
The potential of the Sagami River valley for hydroelectric power development began to be developed in the 1930s, with the growth of industry and electrical consumption in the Yokohama-Kanagawa industrial belt. Work on the Sagami Dam, the first dam on the main stream of the Sagami River began in 1938; however, lack of funding and the advent of World War II delayed completion until after the end of the war. Work on the Shiroyama Dam, in the former town of Tsukui, Tsukui District commenced in 1960 and was completed in 1965 by the Kumagai Gumi construction company.

== Design ==
The Shiroyama Dam is a hollow-core concrete gravity dam. It was designed to provide flood control, and industrial and drinking water to the cities of Yokohama, Kawasaki, Yokosuka and the Shōnan area. It also serves as a Pumped-storage hydroelectricity facility in conjunction with the Honzawa Dam further upstream. The associated Shiroyama Hydroelectric Power Plant has a rated capacity of 250,000 kW of power, and the Tsukui Hydroelectric Power Plant has an additional capacity of 25,000 kW. The reversible turbine generators at the Shiroyama Power Plant were designed to function as either electrical power generators, or as pumps, to reverse the flow of water back into the reservoir of the Honzawa Dam in times of low demand.

Lake Tsukui (津久井湖, Tsukui-ko) created by the dam is a major leisure destination in Kanagawa Prefecture, popular with boaters, fishers and campers.

== Surroundings ==
Public access to the Shiroyama Dam and to Lake Tsukui are by Japan National Route 413, which actually runs across the top of the dam itself. Tsukuiko Shiroyama park is located near the dam.
