= Odakyū-Sagamihara Station =

Railway station in Sagamihara, Kanagawa Prefecture, Japan

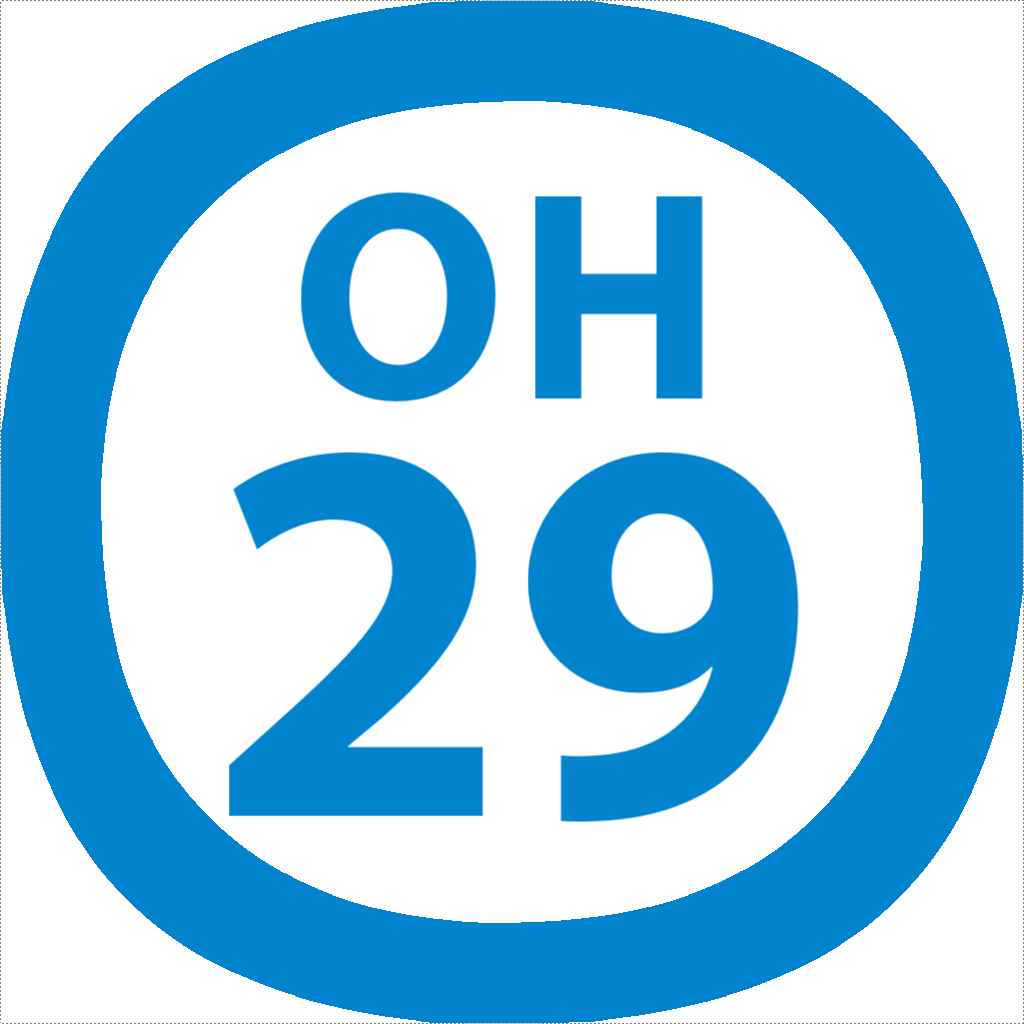
Odakyu-Sagamihara Station 小田急相模原駅

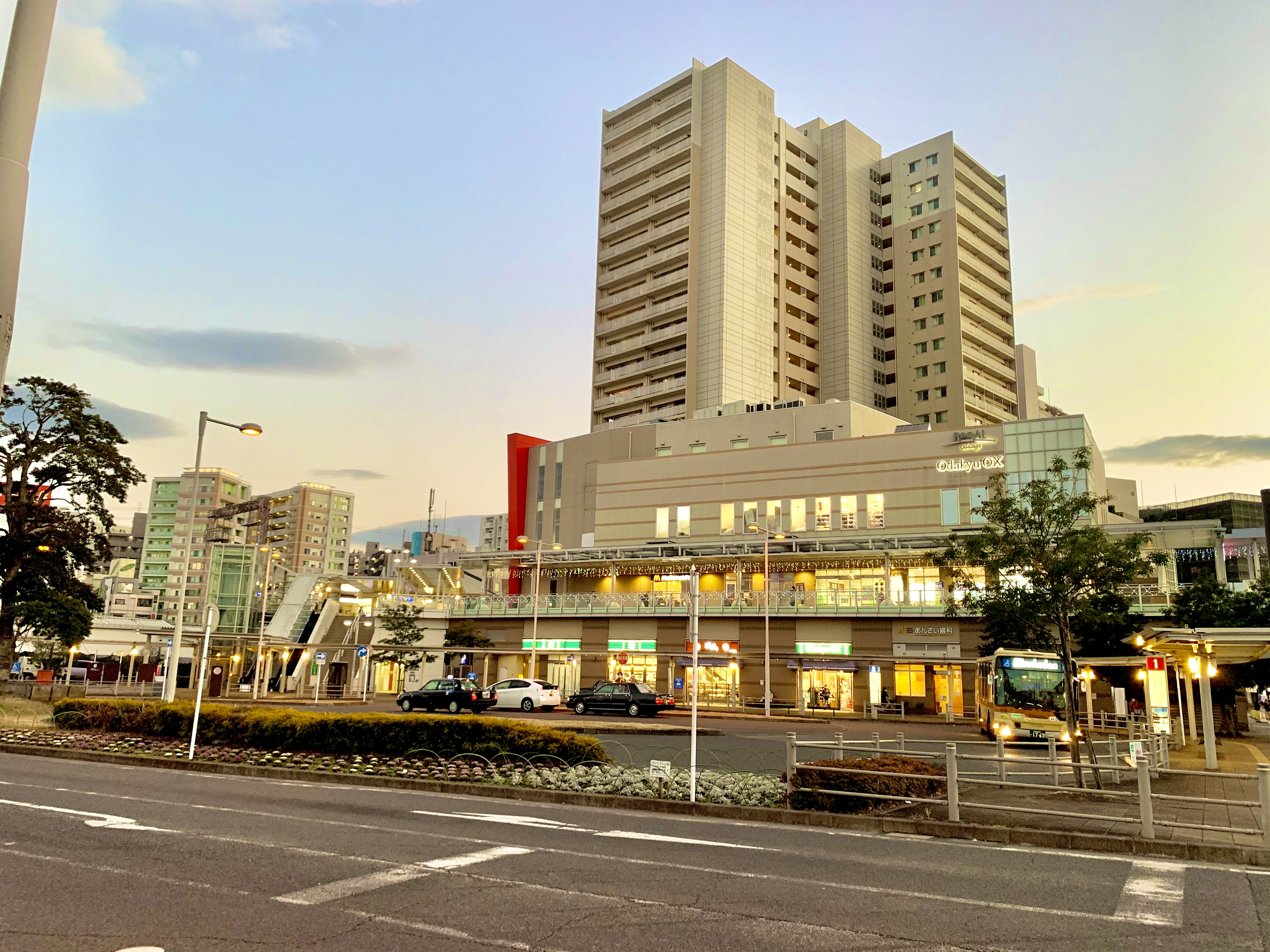
- North Exit of Odakyu-Sagamihara Station, February 2021

General information
- Location: 3-20-1 Minami-dai, Minami-ku, Sagamihara-shi, Kanagawa-ken 252-0314; Japan
- Coordinates: 35°30′55.6″N 139°25′22.4″E
- Operator: Odakyu Electric Railway
- Line: Odakyu Odawara Line
- Distance: 34.7 km from Shinjuku
- Platforms: 2 side platforms
- Connections: Bus terminal

Other information
- Station code: OH-29
- Website: Official website

History
- Opened: 1 March 1938; 88 years ago
- Former names: Sagamihara (until 1941)

Passengers
- FY2019: 57,496 daily

Services
Preceding station	Odakyu	Following station
Sōbudai-mae One-way operation	Odawara Line Commuter Semi Express	Sagami-Ōno towards Yoyogi-Uehara
Sōbudai-mae towards Hon-Atsugi	Odawara Line Semi Express	Sagami-Ōno towards Yoyogi-Uehara
Sōbudai-mae towards Odawara	Odawara Line Local	Sagami-Ōno towards Shinjuku or Yoyogi-Uehara
Location
- Location within Kanagawa Prefecture Location within Japan

Odakyu-Sagamihara Station (小田急相模原駅, Odakyū-Sagamihara-eki) is a passenger railway station located in the city of Sagamihara, Kanagawa, Japan, and operated by the private railway operator Odakyu Electric Railway.

== Lines ==
Odakyu-Sagamihara Station is served by the Odakyu Odawara Line, and is 34.7 km (21.6 mi) from the line's Tokyo terminal at Shinjuku Station. The station is located on the border of Sagamihara with the city of Zama.

== Station layout ==
Odakyū-Sagamihara Station has two side platforms serving two tracks, connected to the station building by footbridges. The station building is elevated, and is located above the tracks and platforms.

=== Platforms ===
1	■ Odakyu Odawara Line	for Hon-Atsugi, Shin-Matsuda, and Odawara
2	■ Odakyu Odawara Line	for Kyodo, Shimo-Kitazawa, Yoyogi-Uehara, and Shinjuku; Tokyo Metro Chiyoda Line for Ayase

== History ==
The station first opened on 1 March 1938, as Sagamihara Station. It was renamed Odakyu-Sagamihara Station on 5 April 1941.

Station numbering was introduced in January 2014 with Odakyu-Sagamihara being assigned station number OH29.

== Passenger statistics ==
In fiscal 2019, the station was used by an average of 57,496 passengers daily.

The passenger figures for previous years are as shown below.

Fiscal year	daily average
2005	54,477
2010	55,034
2015	56,293

== Surrounding area ==
- Sagamidai Town Development Center / Sagamidai Public Hall
- Ito-Yokado
- Sagamihara Housing Area
- NHO Sagamihara National Hospital
- Zama Post Office
- Tokai University Sagami Junior &Senior High School

== See also ==
- List of railway stations in Japan
