= Melanella persimilis =

Scientific classification
- Kingdom: Animalia
- Phylum: Mollusca
- Class: Gastropoda
- Subclass: Caenogastropoda
- Order: Littorinimorpha
- Family: Eulimidae
- Genus: Melanella
- Species: M. persimilis

Binomial name
- Melanella persimilis (Kuroda & T. Habe, 1971)

Synonyms
- Balcis persimilis Kuroda & T. Habe, 1971 superseded combination

Species of gastropod

Melanella persimilis is a species of sea snail, a marine gastropod mollusk in the family Eulimidae.

== Distribution ==
This marine species is endemic to Japan and occurs in Sagami Bay.
