= Sagami Dam =

Dam in Kanagawa Prefecture, Japan

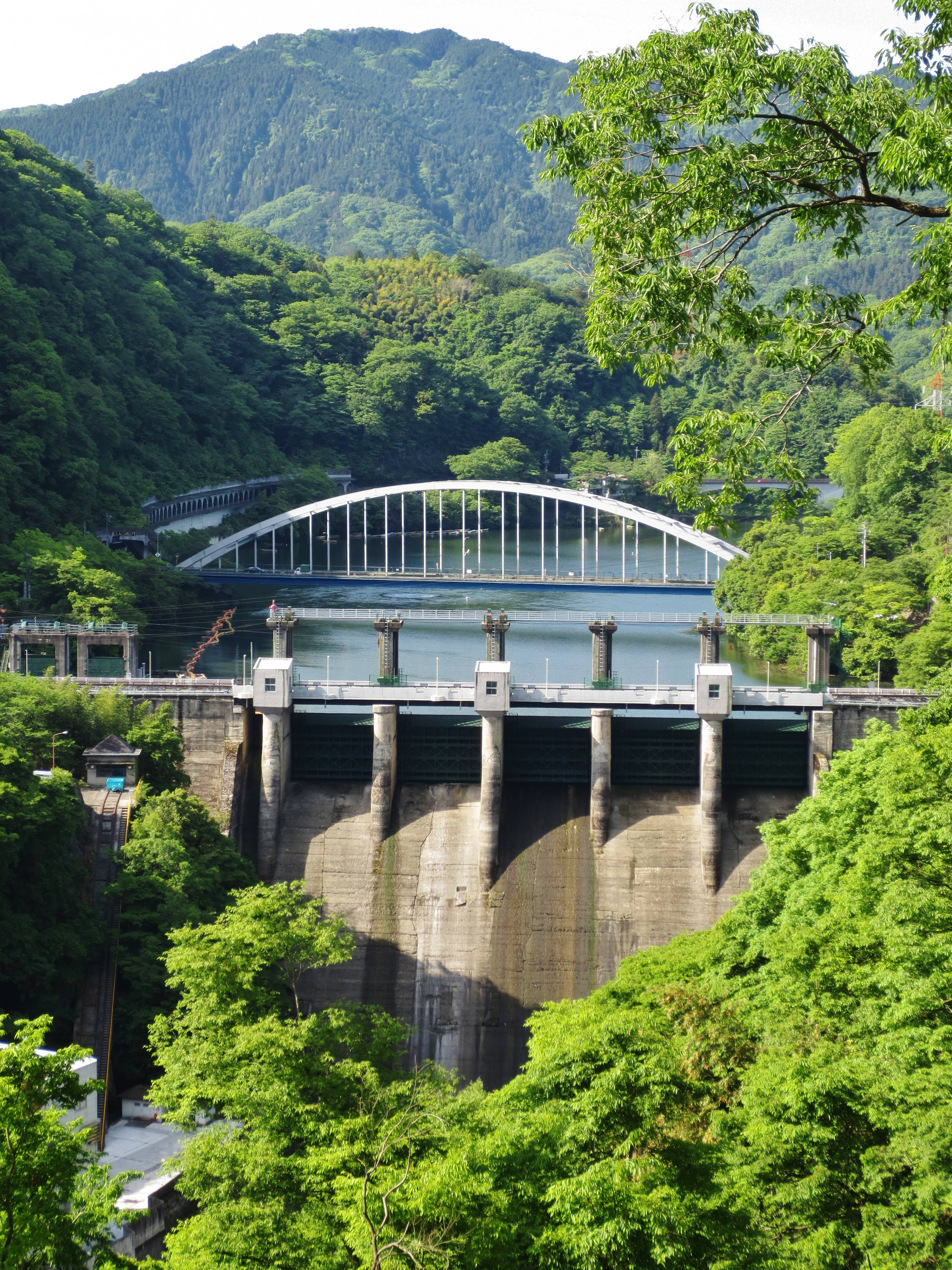
- Interactive map of Sagami Dam
- Official name: 相模ダム
- Location: Kanagawa Prefecture, Japan
- Coordinates: 35°36′55.8″N 139°11′43.4″E
- Construction began: 1938
- Opening date: 1947
- Operator: Kanagawa Prefecture

Dam and spillways
- Type of dam: Gravity
- Impounds: Sagami River
- Height: 58.4 m (192 ft)
- Length: 196 m (643 ft)

Reservoir
- Creates: Lake Sagami
- Total capacity: 63,200,000 m^{3} (2.23×10^{9} cu ft)
- Catchment area: 1,128 km^{2} (436 sq mi)
- Surface area: 326 hectares

The Sagami Dam (相模ダム, Sagami damu) is a multi-purpose dam on the main stream Sagami River in Sagamihara, Kanagawa Prefecture on the island of Honshū, Japan.

== History ==
The potential of the Sagami River valley for hydroelectric power development began to be developed in the 1930s, with the growth of population in the Shonan region, and the expansion of industry and electrical consumption in the Yokohama-Kanagawa industrial belt. Plans for a dam on the Sagami River were submitted to the Home Ministry in 1935, but approval was delayed in favor of other projects. Instead, the Kanagawa Prefectural Assembly passed the necessary regulations and secured a special budget to begin work in 1938.

Construction work did not begin immediately, due to strong opposition from 196 families who needed to be relocated from the area to be flooded by the dam. However, the wartime demands for power and industrial water by the Yokosuka Naval Arsenal and by the Keihin Industrial complex became critical, and General Sadao Araki ordered troops into the area to force compliance with the relocation.

Work on the Sagami Dam began in 1941 by the Kumagai Gumi construction company. The advent of World War II delayed completion until 1947. Annual memorial services are held to honor the laborers that died building the dam. Historical documents show the cruelty faced by forced laborers - long hours, poor nutrition and rampant disease due to malnourishment and cruel abuse.

== Design ==
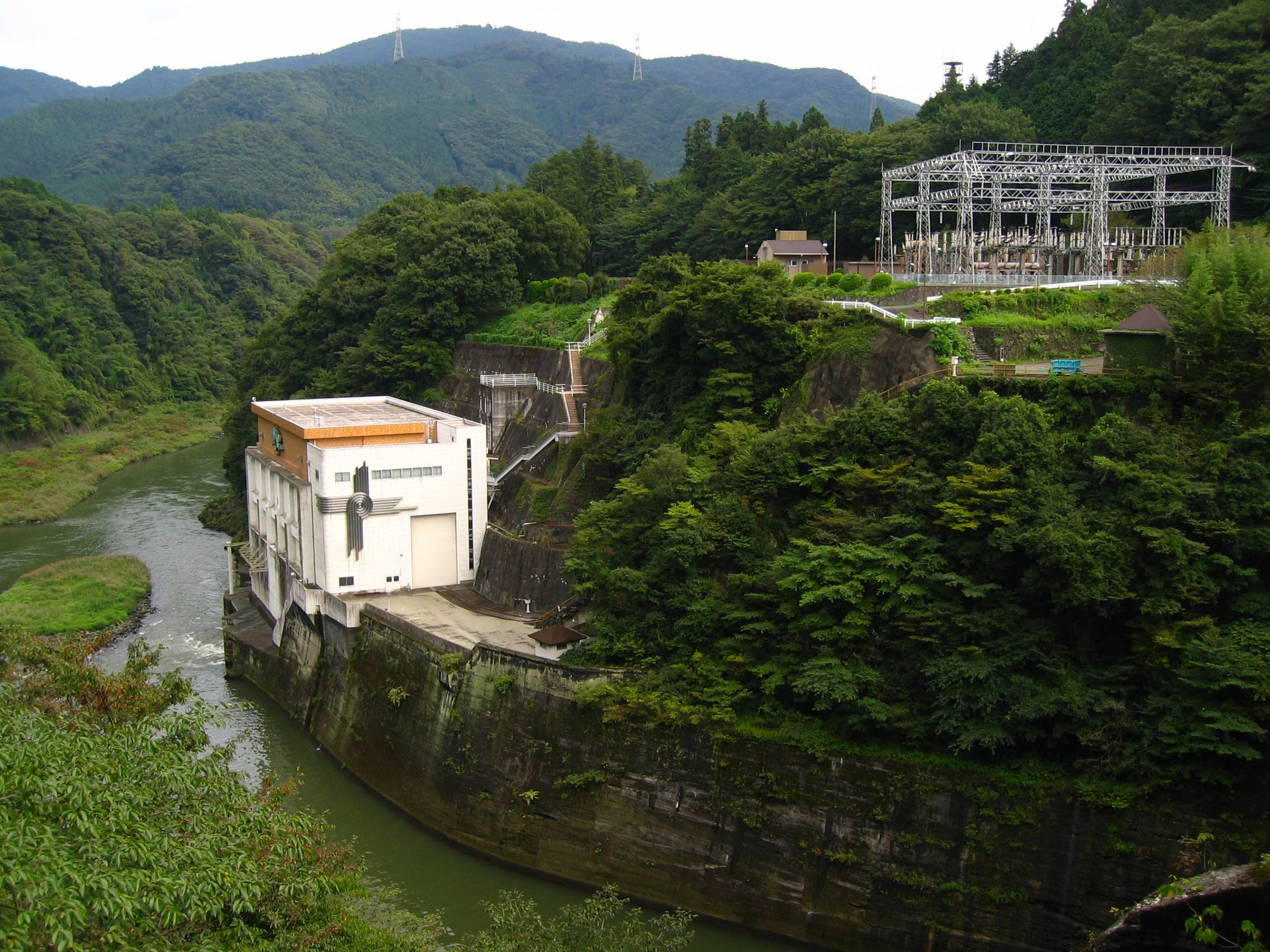
Sagami Hydroelectric Power Station

The Sagami Dam a hollow-core concrete gravity dam. It was designed to provide flood control, and industrial and drinking water to the cities of Yokohama, Kawasaki, Yokosuka and the Shōnan area. The associated Sagami Hydroelectric Power Plant has a rated capacity of 31,000 KW of power. The reservoir created by the dam, Lake Sagami is a major recreational location for Kanagawa Prefecture.

== See also ==
- Lake Sagami
