= Sōbudai-mae Station =

Railway station in Zama, Kanagawa Prefecture, Japan

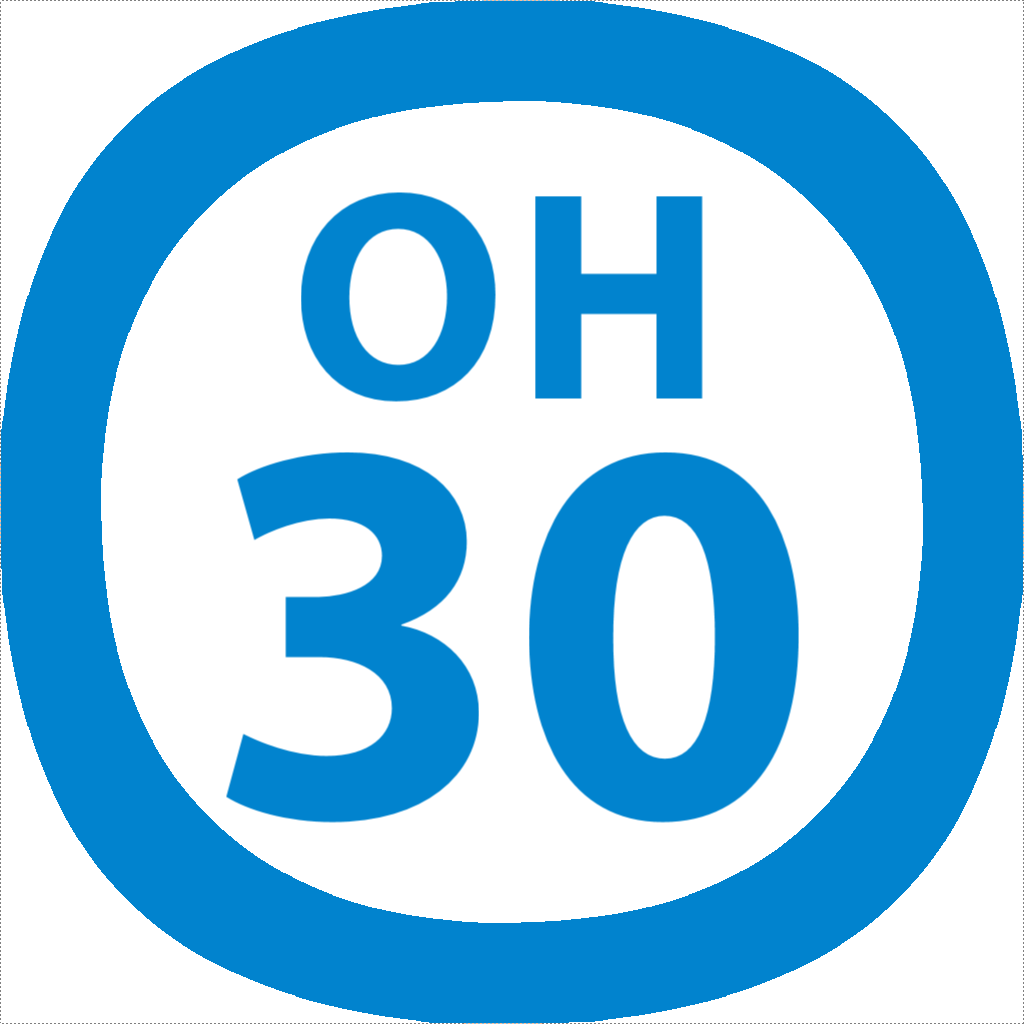
Sōbudai-mae Station 相武台前駅

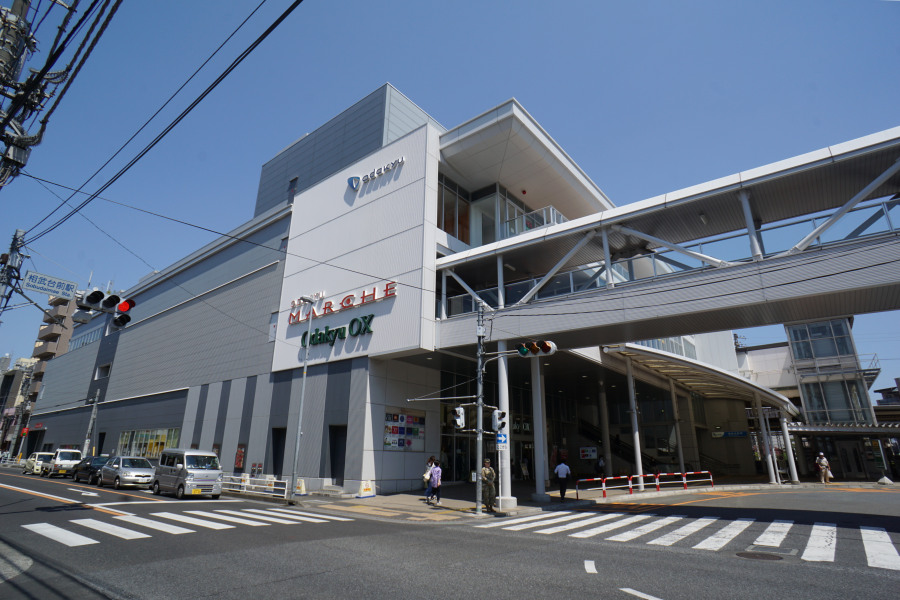
- North Exit of Sōbudai-mae Station, May 2017

General information
- Location: 1-4759 Sōbudai, Zama-shi, Kanagawa-ken 252-0011; Japan
- Coordinates: 35°29′57.8″N 139°24′30.9″E
- Operator: Odakyu Electric Railway
- Line: Odakyu Odawara Line
- Distance: 36.9 km from Shinjuku
- Platforms: 2 island platforms
- Connections: Bus terminal

Other information
- Station code: OH-30
- Website: Official website

History
- Opened: 1 April 1927; 99 years ago
- Former names: Zama (to 1937); Shikan-Gakkō-mae (to 1941)

Passengers
- FY2019: 40,324 daily

Services
Preceding station	Odakyu	Following station
Zama One-way operation	Odawara Line Commuter Semi Express	Odakyu-Sagamihara towards Yoyogi-Uehara
Zama towards Hon-Atsugi	Odawara Line Semi Express	Odakyu-Sagamihara towards Yoyogi-Uehara
Zama towards Odawara	Odawara Line Local	Odakyu-Sagamihara towards Shinjuku or Yoyogi-Uehara
Location
- Location within Kanagawa Prefecture Location within Japan

Landscape near the station

Sōbudai-mae Station (相武台前駅, Sōbudai-mae-eki) is a passenger railway station located in the city of Zama, Kanagawa, Japan, and operated by the private railway operator Odakyu Electric Railway.

== Lines ==
Sōbudai-mae Station is served by Odakyu Odawara Line, and is located 36.9 km from the line's Tokyo terminal at Shinjuku Station. It is the closest station to the US Army's Camp Zama facility and is close to the border of Zama with the city of Sagamihara.

== Station layout ==
View towards Zama

Sōbudai-mae Station has two island platforms and four tracks, connected to the station building by footbridges. The station building is elevated, and is located above the tracks and platforms.

=== Platforms ===
1	■ Odakyu Odawara Line	for Hon-Atsugi, Shin-Matsuda, and Odawara
2	■ Odakyu Odawara Line	for Hon-Atsugi, Shin-Matsuda, and Odawara
3	■ Odakyu Odawara Line	for Sagami-Ōno , Shimo-Kitazawa, Yoyogi-Uehara, and Shinjuku; Tokyo Metro Chiyoda Line for Ayase
4	■ Odakyu Odawara Line	for Sagami-Ōno, Shimo-Kitazawa, Yoyogi-Uehara, and Shinjuku; Tokyo Metro Chiyoda Line for Ayase

== History ==
Sōbudai-mae Station opened on 1 April 1927 as Zama Station (座間駅). With the opening of the nearby Imperial Japanese Army Academy (Rikugun Shikan Gakkō), the station was renamed Shikan-gakkō-mae Station (士官学校前駅) on 1 June 1937. However, as part of the counter-intelligence movement to eliminate the names of military facilities from maps, the station was renamed Sōbudai-mae Station on 1 January 1941.

Station numbering was introduced in January 2014 with Sōbudai-mae being assigned station number OH30.

== Passenger statistics ==
In fiscal 2019, the station was used by an average of 40,324 passengers daily.

The passenger figures for previous years are as shown below.

Fiscal year	daily average
2005	40,814
2010	39,160
2015	38,851

== See also ==
- List of railway stations in Japan
