= Kashio River =

River in Japan

Coordinates: 35°20′7″N 139°29′36″E

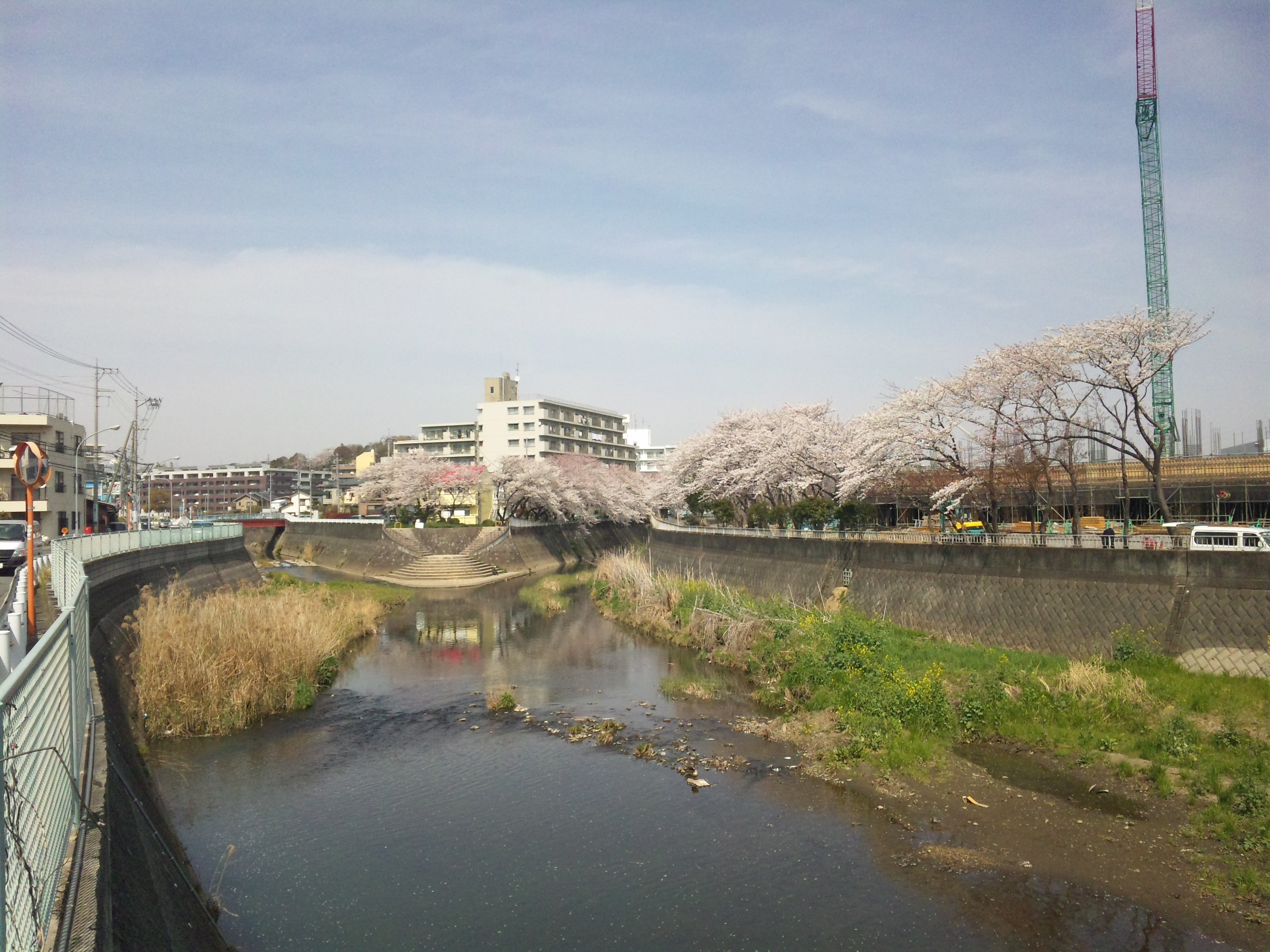

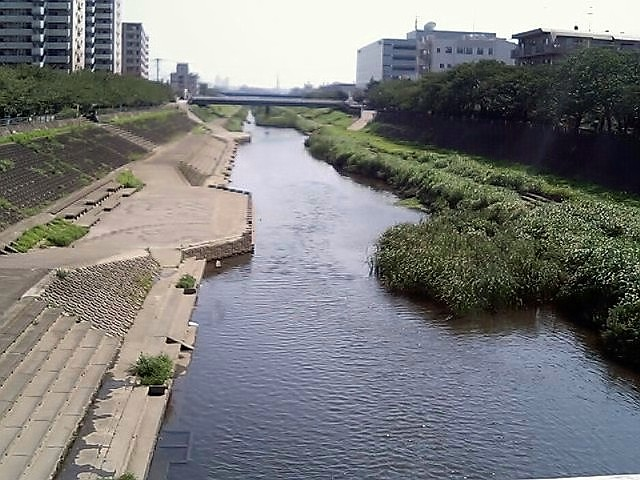
Kashio river from Sakura bridge

The Kashio River (柏尾川) is a Class B river in Kanagawa Prefecture, Japan, about 50 kilometers southwest of Tokyo. It begins in Kashio, Totsuka-ku, Yokohama at the confluence of the Akuwa River (阿久和川) and the Hiradonagaya River (平戸永谷川) and flows for 11 kilometers to the city of Fujisawa, where it merges with the Sakai River at the confluence known as Kawana (川名). The conjoined river, which is sometimes known as the Katase River, then flows into Sagami Bay at Enoshima Island.

The catchment basin of the Kashio River is approximately 84 sq. kilometers. Because the Kashio River is a short, meandering stream, with a minimal descent, it has long been notorious for flooding. The predecessor of the Kashio River was the shallow Ōfuna Estuary (大船入江), which existed from the end of the last ice age to about 300 BC. Subsequently, earthquakes caused crustal uplift, which cut off the estuary from the bay, making it into a floodplain with the Kashio River at its center. As the river often flooded, it formed a lake that left behind a swamp as it drained. The early lake formed in the floodplain of the Kashio River is probably the lake mentioned in the Enoshima Engi, a history of the area.
