= Zama Station =

Railway station in Zama, Kanagawa Prefecture, Japan

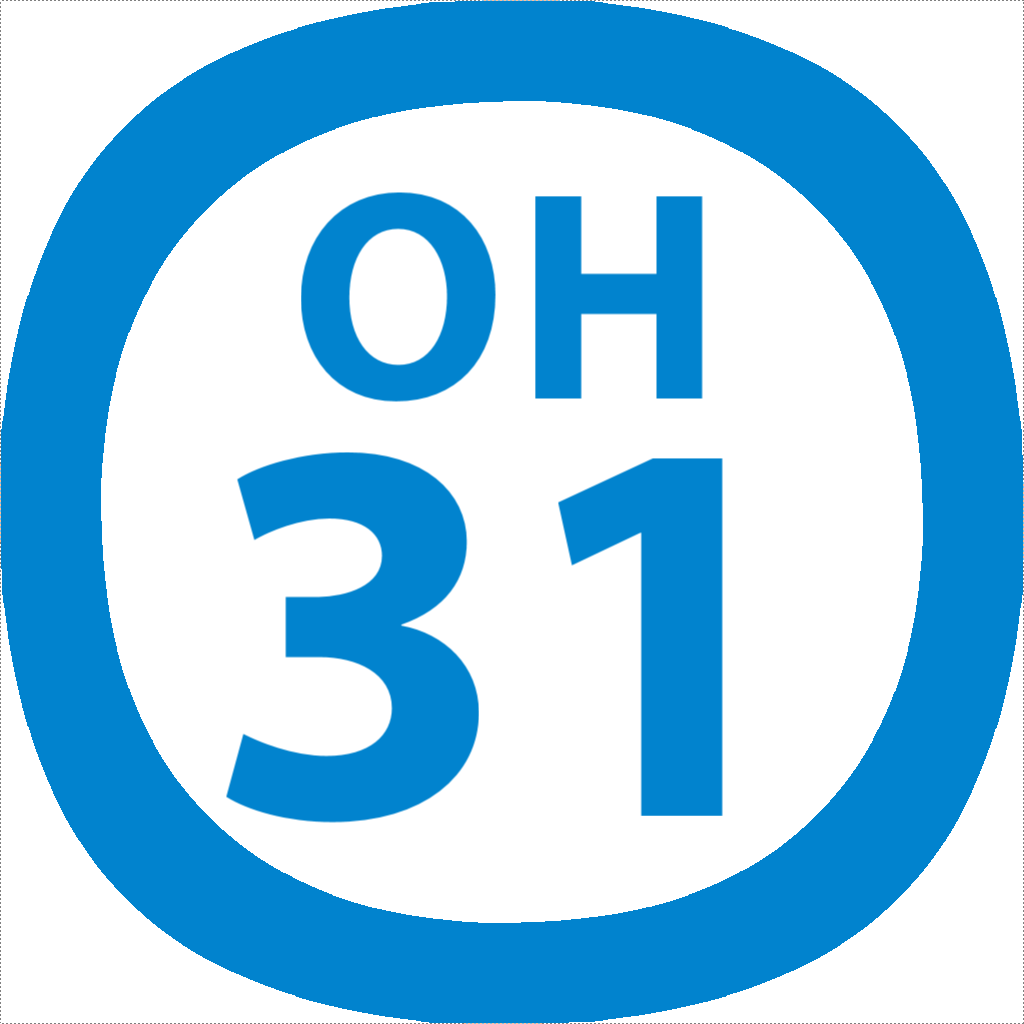
Zama Station 座間駅

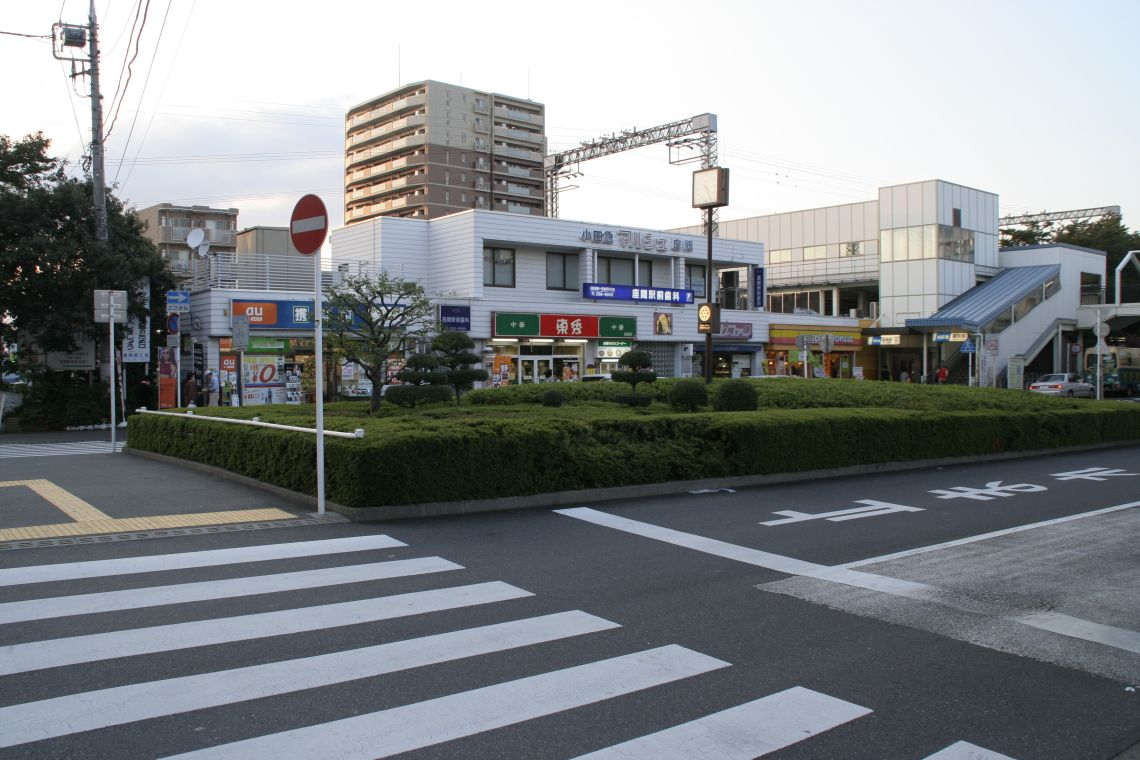
- East Exit of Zama Station

General information
- Location: 5-1682 Iriya, Zama-shi, Kanagawa-ken 252-0029; Japan
- Coordinates: 35°28′50.5″N 139°23′59.7″E
- Operator: Odakyu Electric Railway
- Line: Odakyu Odawara Line
- Distance: 39.2 km from Shinjuku
- Platforms: 2 side platforms
- Connections: Bus terminal

Other information
- Station code: OH-31
- Website: Official website

History
- Opened: 28 July 1927; 99 years ago
- Former names: Shin-Zama (to 1937); Zama-Yūen (to 1941)

Passengers
- FY2019: 20,833 daily

Services
Preceding station	Odakyu	Following station
Ebina One-way operation	Odawara Line Commuter Semi Express	Sōbudai-mae towards Yoyogi-Uehara
Ebina towards Hon-Atsugi	Odawara Line Semi Express	Sōbudai-mae towards Yoyogi-Uehara
Ebina towards Odawara	Odawara Line Local	Sōbudai-mae towards Shinjuku or Yoyogi-Uehara
Location
- Location within Kanagawa Prefecture Location within Japan

Zama Station (座間駅, Zama-eki) is a passenger railway station located in the city of Zama, Kanagawa, Japan, and operated by the private railway operator Odakyu Electric Railway.

== Lines ==
Zama Station is served by the Odakyu Odawara Line, and is located 39.2 km (24.4 mi) from the line's Tokyo terminal at Shinjuku Station.

== Station layout ==
The station consists of two side platforms serving two tracks, connected to the station building by footbridges. The station building is elevated, and is located above the tracks and platforms.

=== Platforms ===
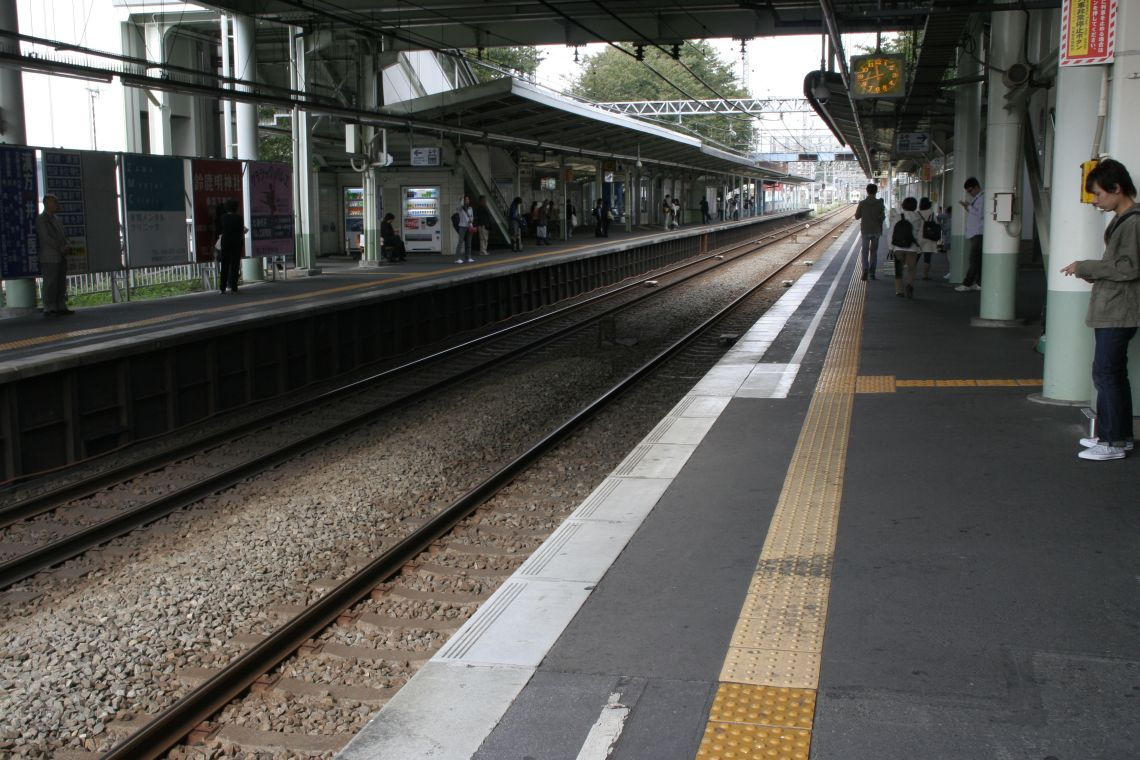
View of the platforms, October 2007

1	■ Odakyu Odawara Line	for Hon-Atsugi, Shin-Matsuda, and Odawara
2	■ Odakyu Odawara Line	for Sagami-Ono, Shin-Yurigaoka, Yoyogi-Uehara, and Shinjuku; Tokyo Metro Chiyoda Line for Ayase

== History ==
The station opened on 1 March 1927, as Shin-Zama Station (新座間駅). It was renamed Zama-Yūen Station (座間遊園駅) on 1 July 1937, and on 15 October 1941, it was renamed Zama Station.

Station numbering was introduced in January 2014, with Zama being assigned station number OH31.

== Passenger statistics ==
In fiscal 2019, the station was used by an average of 20,833 passengers daily.

The passenger figures for previous years are as shown below.

Fiscal year	Daily average
2005	22,128
2010	21,983
2015	21,732

== Surrounding area ==
=== West Entrance ===
- Hoshigaya Temple
- Nashi-no-ki ruins
- Suzukamyō Shrine
- Iriya Elementary School
- Zama High School
- Zama Special School
- JA Sagami Zama
- Uni Zama store (department store)
- Zama Police station
- Iriya Station (JR Sagami Line)

=== East Entrance ===
- Odakyu OX
- Yatoyama Park
- Zama Station Post office

== Buses ==
=== West Entrance ===
Services are operated by Kanagawa Chuo Transportation and Zama Community Bus.

- <Iriya Route> City Office branch (ZCB)
- <Iriya Route> Main City Office (ZCB)
- <Ebina 10> Ebina Station East Entrance (Kanachu)
- <Ebina 10> Sobudai-mae Station (via Tatsunodai) (Kanachu)

=== East Entrance ===
Services are operated by Kanagawa Chuo Transportation.

- <Sobudaishita 02> Sobudai-shita Station
- <Sobudai 04> Zama-Yotsuya
- <Sobudai 04, Ebina 10> Sobudai-mae Station (via Tatsunodai)
- <Sobudaishita 02> Sagamino Station North Entrance (via Tatsunodai)

== See also ==
- List of railway stations in Japan
