= Sakai River (Kanagawa–Tokyo) =

River in Tokyo and Kanagawa, Japan

Coordinates: 35°18′19″N 139°28′52″E

- /2/idsDoes not match the regex pattern ^Q[1-9]\d{0,19}(\s*,\s*Q[1-9]\d{0,19})*$; /2/idsString value found, but an array is required; /2/idsFailed to match exactly one schema; /2/titleThe property title is required; /2/serviceDoes not have a value in the enumeration ["page"]; /2Failed to match exactly one schema; /2/geometriesThe property geometries is required; /2/typeDoes not have a value in the enumeration ["GeometryCollection"]; /2/typeDoes not have a value in the enumeration ["MultiPolygon"]; /2/typeDoes not have a value in the enumeration ["Point"]; /2/typeDoes not have a value in the enumeration ["MultiPoint"]; /2/typeDoes not have a value in the enumeration ["LineString"]; /2/typeDoes not have a value in the enumeration ["MultiLineString"]; /2/typeDoes not have a value in the enumeration ["Polygon"]; /2/coordinatesThe property coordinates is required; /2/geometryThe property geometry is required; /2/typeDoes not have a value in the enumeration ["Feature"]; /2/featuresThe property features is required; /2/typeDoes not have a value in the enumeration ["FeatureCollection"]

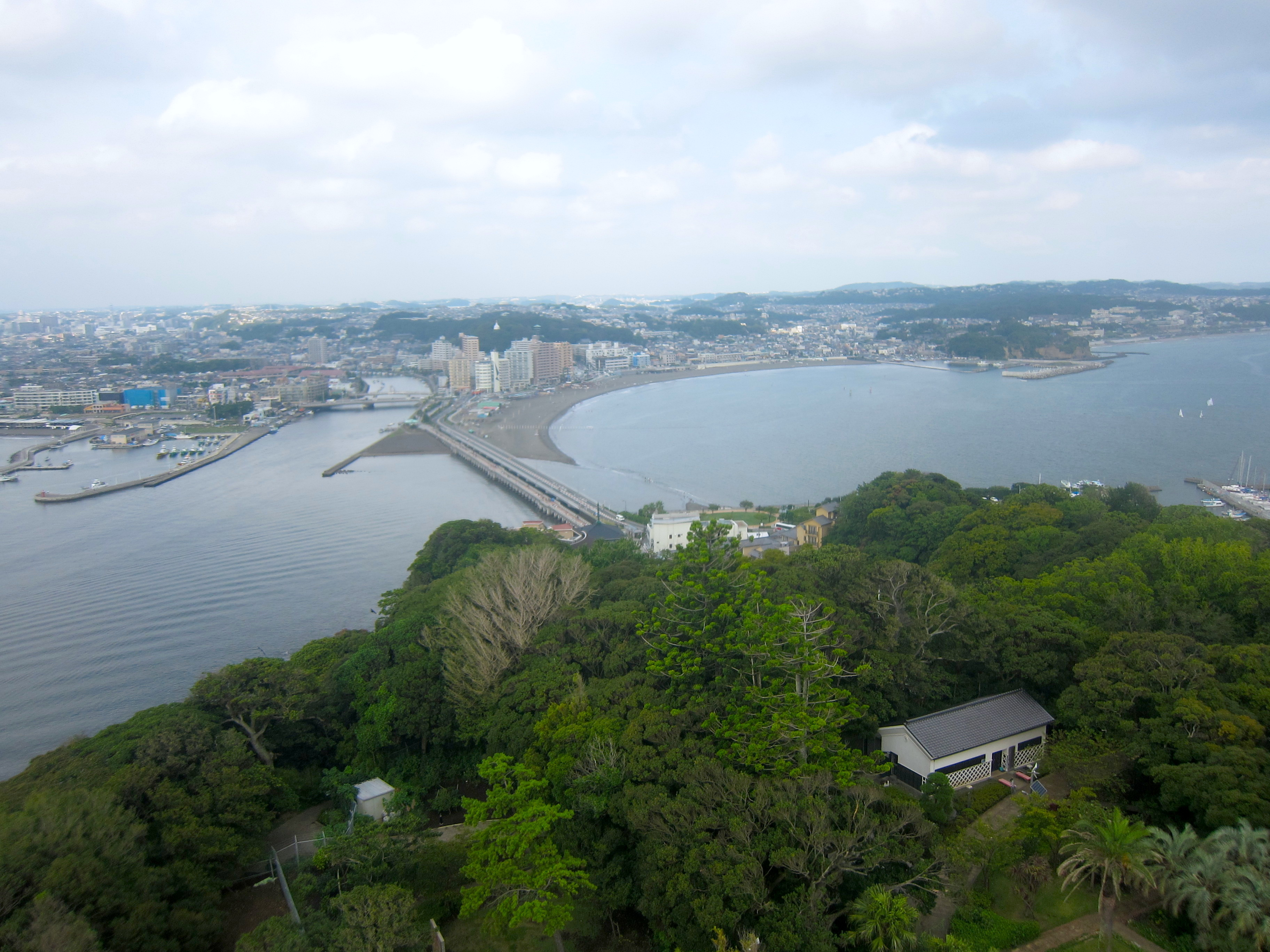
A view from Enoshima Lighthouse shows the Sakai River flowing into Sagami Bay between Sakai Fishing Port (left) and the Enoshima Benten Bridge (center).

The Sakai River (境川, Sakai-gawa) is a Class B river in Tokyo and Kanagawa Prefecture which flows into the Bay of Sagami of the Pacific Ocean.

== The Sakai River ==
The Sakai River has with the length of 52.1 km and the basin size of 210.7 square km. It starts from Aihara-machi (Japanese: 相原町), Machida, Tokyo, to Katase, Fujisawa, Kanagawa, near Enoshima Island. It is called "Sakai", meaning "border", because it flows on the border of the former provinces of Musashi and Sagami.

As the Sakai River and its tributaries are prone to flooding (especially in spring and during the typhoon season), as a protection they were encased in concrete during the postwar period. The rivers continue to flood, but do not overflow their banks as frequently as in the past.

== Aliases ==
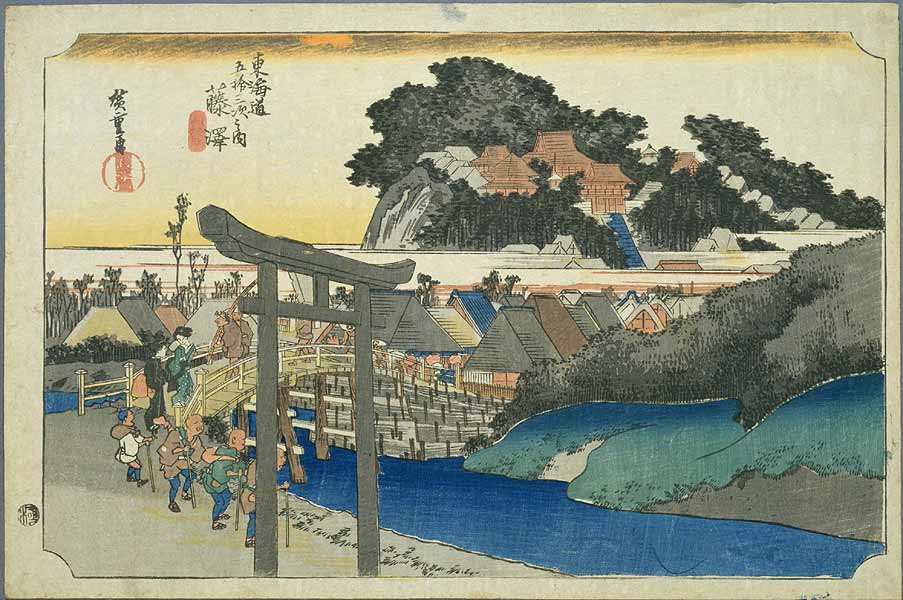
"Fujisawa-shuku" in Hiroshige's Ukiyo-e series, "The Fifty-Three Stations of the Tōkaidō", shows the Daigiri Bridge (now called the Yugyō-ji Bridge) over the Sakai River, with Enoshima in the back.

The river often used to be called the Takakura River (Japanese: 高座川) because it flowed through Kōza District, Kanagawa (Japanese: 高座郡), the Kun'yomi reading of the two "Kōza" Kanji characters being Takakura. Also, the short section of the river from the point where it is joined by the Kashio River to the mouth of the river is sometimes called the Katase River.

== Recreation ==
There are walking and bicycle routes along the banks of the Sakai River, from Machida, Tokyo, to the river mouth in Fujisawa, Kanagawa.

Mooring of pleasure boats in the river is now prohibited.

== Katase River ==
The Katase River (片瀬川, Katase-gawa) is a segment of the Sakai River in Shōnan, central Japan, about 50 kilometers southwest of Tokyo. The Katase is an approximately 3-kilometer-long segment of the Sakai River from Kawana (川名), Fujisawa, where the Sakai River and Kashio River join, to a point at Enoshima Island, where the river flows into Sagami Bay. The river's name comes from Fujisawa City's Katase area through which it flows, at the foot of Kataseyama (片瀬山), and goes under the Katase Bridge of Route 134, before it meets Sagami Bay beside Katase Fisheries Port.
