= Zama, Kanagawa =

Zama 座間市
- City
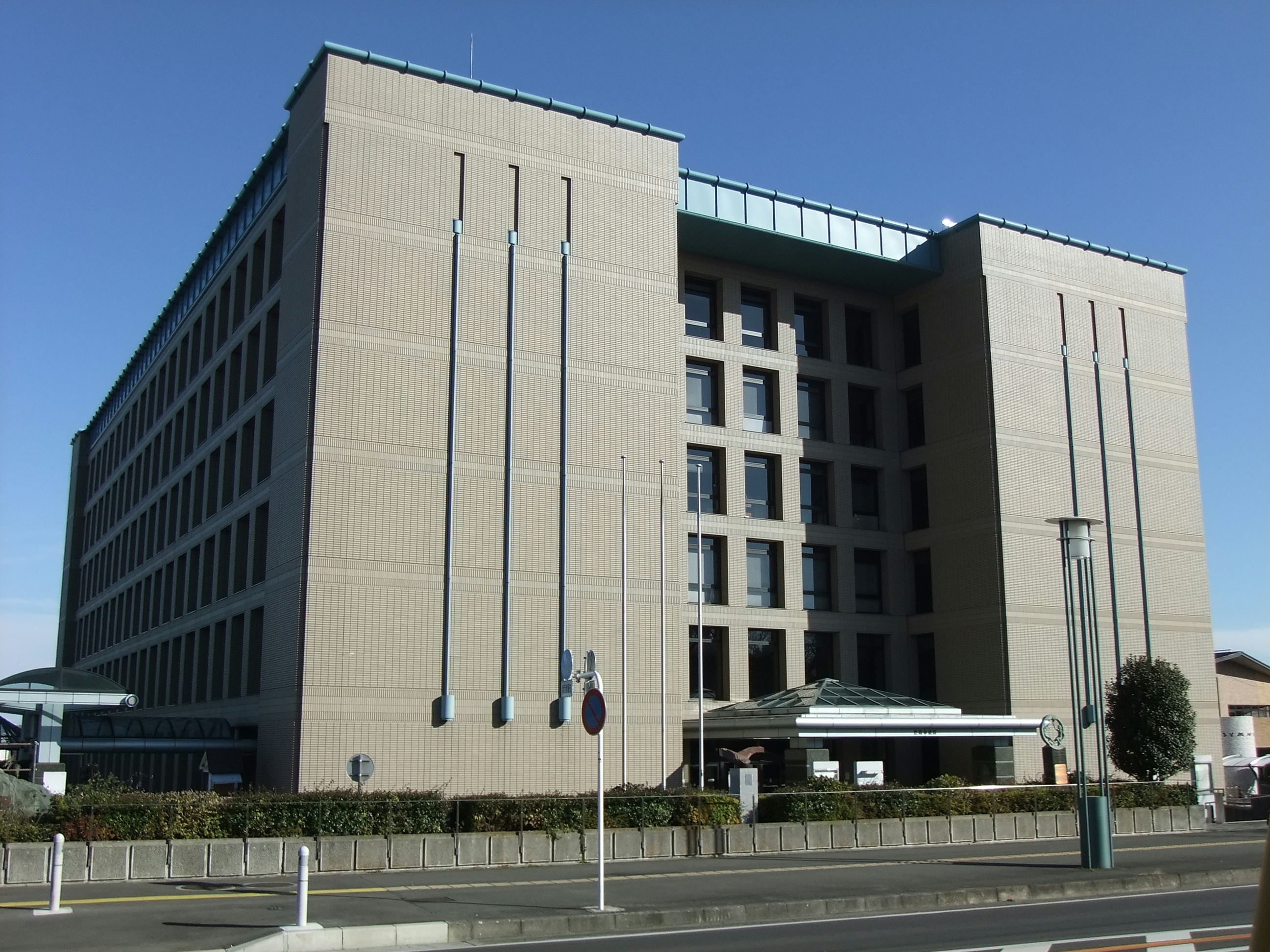
- Zama City Hall

- Flag Seal

- Location of Zama in Kanagawa Prefecture

- Coordinates: 35°29′N 139°24′E
- Country: Japan
- Region: Kantō
- Prefecture: Kanagawa

Area
  - Total: 17.58 km^{2} (6.79 sq mi)

Population (June 1, 2021)
  - Total: 130,667
  - Density: 7,433/km^{2} (19,250/sq mi)
- Time zone: UTC+9 (Japan Standard Time)
- Symbols
  - Tree: Osmanthus
  - Flower: Sunflower
  - Bird: Japanese tit
- Phone number: 046-255-1111
- Address: 1-1-1 Midorigaoka, Zama-shi, Kanagawa-ken 252-8566
- Website: Official website

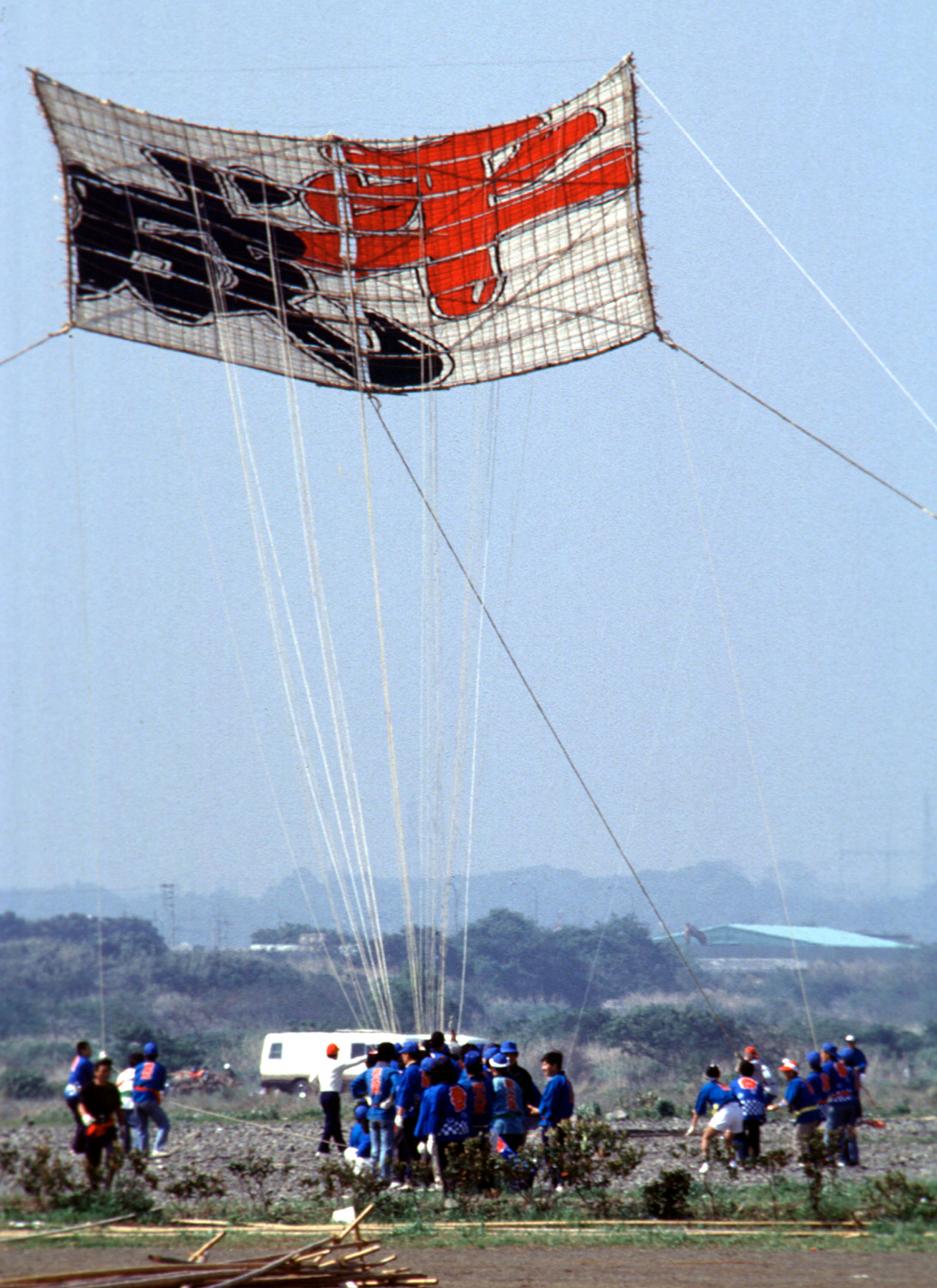
Zama kite festival. First attempt to fly a 40' × 40' handmade kite.

Zama (座間市, Zama-shi) is a city located in Kanagawa Prefecture, Japan. As of 1 June 2021, it had an estimated population of 130,667 and a population density of 7,400 persons per km^{2}. The total area is 17.58 square kilometres (6.79 sq mi). The city hosts the United States Army Camp Zama base.

== Geography ==
Located in central Kanagawa Prefecture, Zama is approximately 50 kilometers from the center of Tokyo and 20 kilometers from Yokohama. It is divided into an alluvial lowland along the Sagami River in the west and a plateau belonging to the Sagamino Plateau (Sagamihara Plateau) in the east. The Hikiji River, Mekushiri River, and the Hato River flow through Zama. The city is well known for its drinking water, which is cold in the summer and warm in the winter.

=== Surrounding municipalities ===
Kanagawa Prefecture

- Atsugi
- Ebina
- Sagamihara
- Yamato

=== Climate ===
Zama has a humid subtropical climate (Köppen Cfa) characterized by warm summers and cool winters with light to no snowfall. The average annual temperature in Zama is 14.4 °C. The average annual rainfall is 1632 mm with September as the wettest month. The temperatures are highest on average in August, at around 25.3 °C, and lowest in January, at around 3.6 °C.

== Demographics ==
Per Japanese census data, the population of Zama has grown steadily over the past 70 years.

Historical population
Year	Pop.	±%
1950	11,810	—
1960	15,402	+30.4%
1970	56,727	+268.3%
1980	93,503	+64.8%
1990	112,102	+19.9%
2000	125,694	+12.1%
2010	129,436	+3.0%
2020	132,325	+2.2%

== History ==
The area around Zama has been settled since prehistoric times, and Jōmon period remains have been found. The hamlet of "Izama" was a post station on the ancient Tōkaidō road connecting Kyoto with the provinces in the Kantō region, and the area was part of the tenryō territory within Sagami Province during the Edo period administered directly by the Tokugawa shogunate through a number of hatamoto-class administrators. During the cadastral reforms after the Meiji Restoration in 1889, the area of present-day Zama consisted of five hamlets in Kōza District, Kanagawa Prefecture.

The area remained very rural until the coming of the Odakyu Electric Railway in 1927 and the Sagami Railway in 1935, which spurred development, but the area was mostly farmland when the Imperial Japanese Army Academy was relocated to the Zama area in 1937. The increase in population led Zama Village to be promoted to Zama town the same year. However, in 1941, Zama Town and surrounding villages were merged into Sagamihara. In 1944, the Kōza Naval Arsenal of the Imperial Japanese Navy was established in the area. It was closed with the end of World War II, and the Imperial Japanese Army Academy was turned over to the United States Army to become Camp Zama.

In September 1948, Zama regained its status as a town independent of Sagamihara. The local economy received a significant boost with the building of a Nissan automobile assembly plant in Zama in 1965, along with other industries. Zama became a city on November 1, 1971.

== Government ==
Zama has a mayor-council form of government with a directly elected mayor and a unicameral city council of 22 members. Zama contributes one member to the Kanagawa Prefectural Assembly. In terms of national politics, the city is part of Kanagawa 13th district of the lower house of the Diet of Japan.

== Economy ==
After the Meiji era, mulberry fields and the raw silk industry dominated the local economy. Zama became heavily industrialized from the 1930s with production of equipment for the Japanese military, and this was followed in the 1950 and 1960s with automobile related production. However, with the economic recession in the 1990s Nissan production ended in 1995, and the economy of Zama suffered accordingly. The city has increasingly become a commuter town for nearby Sagamihara, Yokohama and Tokyo.

- Agriculture: 413 people (0.6%)
- Manufacturing: 18,978 people (29.8%)
- Service: 43,298 people (68.0%)

== Education ==
Zama has 11 public elementary schools and six public middle schools operated by the city government. The city has three public high schools operated by the Kanagawa Prefectural Board of Education, and the prefecture also operates one special education school for the handicapped.

== Transportation ==
=== Railway ===
Odakyu Electric Railway – Odakyu Odawara Line

- Zama - Sōbudai-mae

JR East – Sagami Line

- Iriya

=== Highway ===
- National Route 246

== Sister cities ==
- Smyrna, Tennessee, United States

== Local attractions ==
- Fujiyama Park
- Himawari Park
- Kanigasawa Park
- Onsen (15 hot springs in the city)
- Zama Park
- Zama Yatoyama Park

== Noted people from Zama ==
- Danny Lee Clark, Athlete, Television Personality, Author, Actor, and Producer
- Naoya Inoue, Boxer, Super Bantamweight Champion
- Tomoko Ishimura, Voice Actress
- Keiichiro Koyama, Musician (Originally from Sagamihara, Kanagawa)
- Koyuki, Model and Actress
- Erina Mano, Actress and Singer
- Nanako Matsushima, Actress and Model (Originally from Yokohama, Kanagawa)
- Akina Minami, Fashion Model, Gravure Idol, and Tarento (Originally from Yokohama, Kanagawa)
- Sakura Oda, Singer
- Suzuka Ohgo, Actress
- Shinobu Ohno, Female Footballer
- Shotaro Osaki, Member of K-Pop boy group RIIZE, former member of NCT
- Alcvin Ryuzen Ramos, Shakuhachi Flute Player/Maker
- Saki Shimizu, Singer (Originally from Tokyo)
- Ami Suzuki, Singer/Songwriter, Actress and Dancer

== Gallery ==
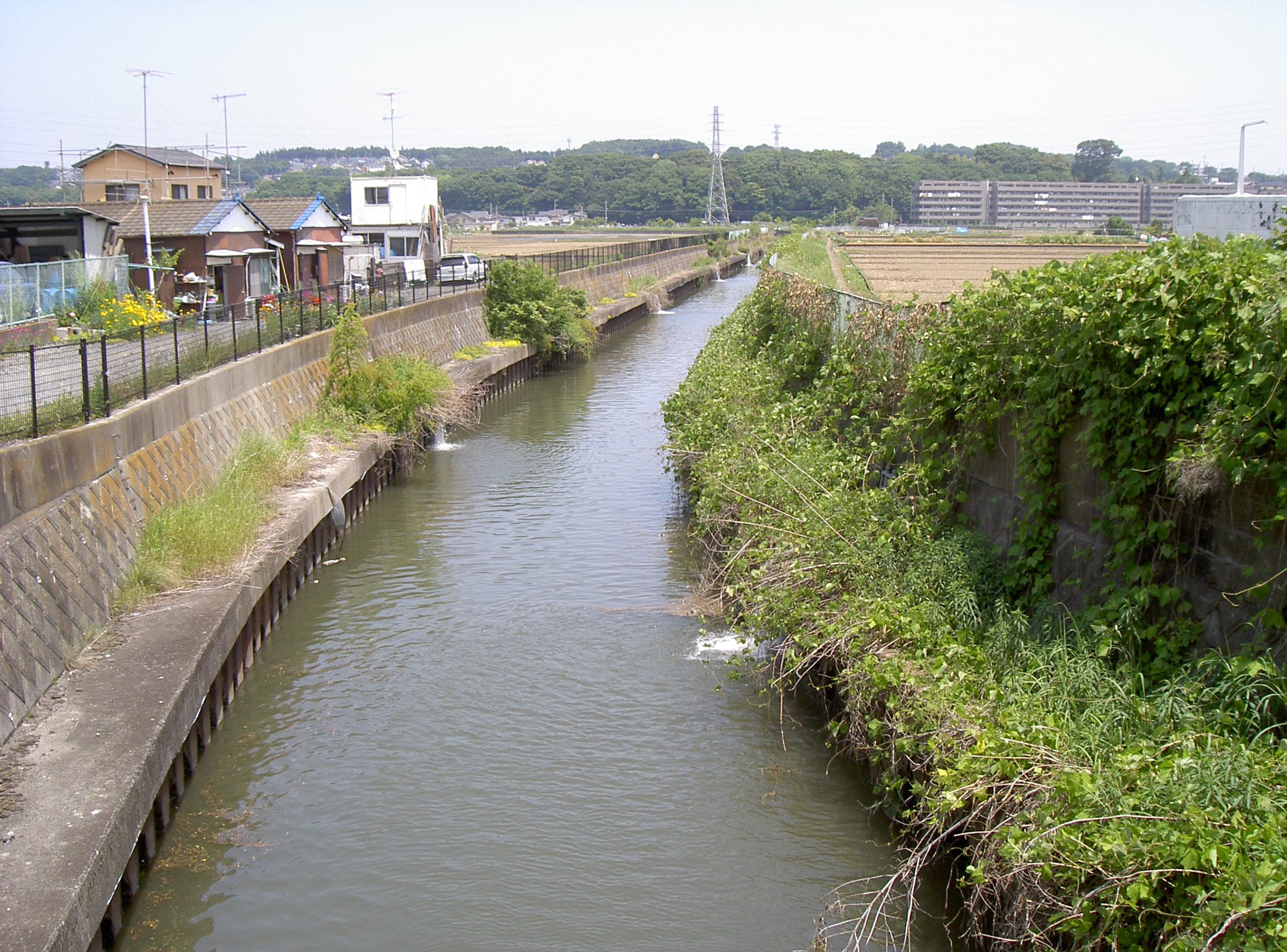
The Hato River

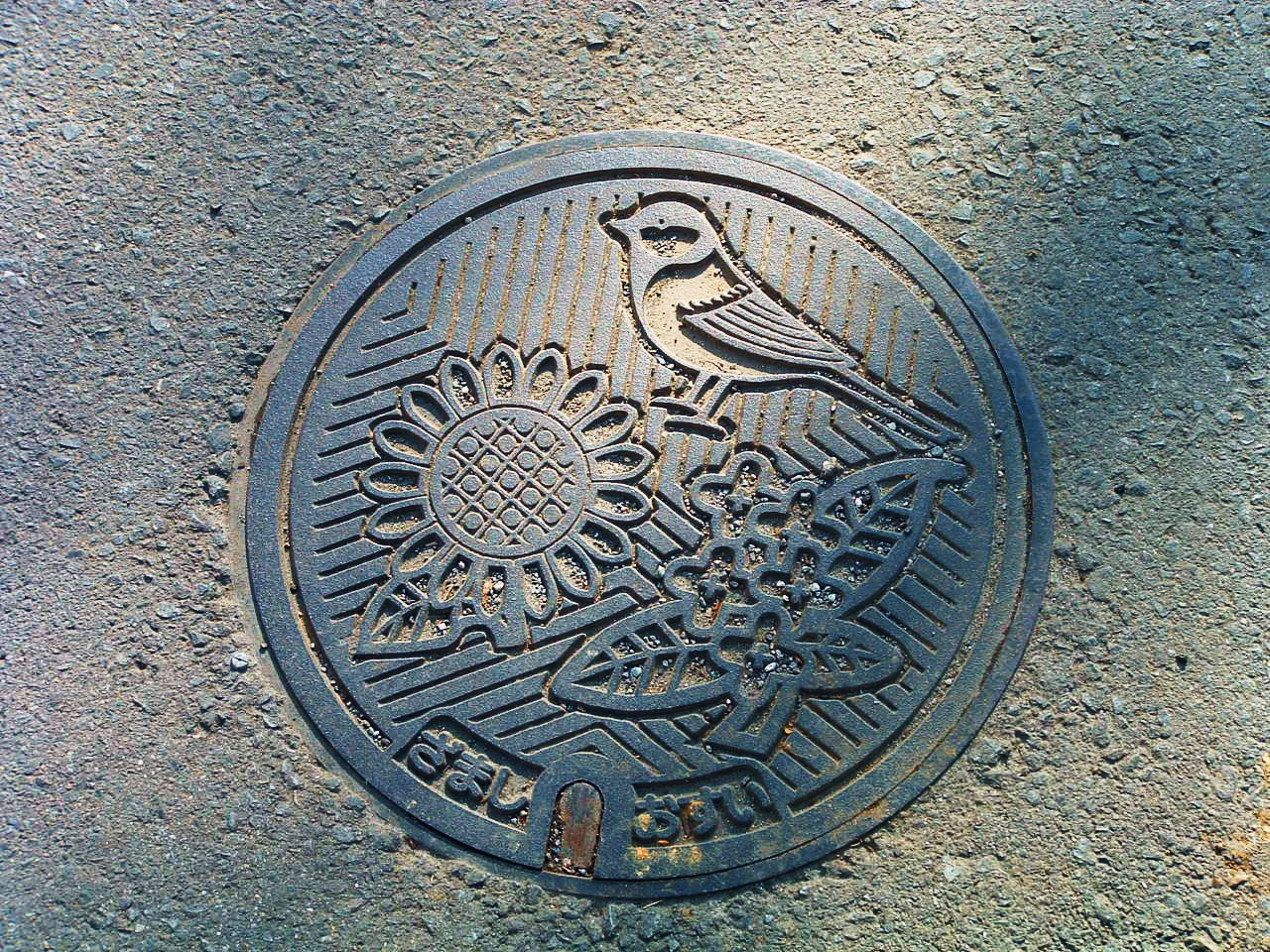
Manhole cover depicting symbols of Zama

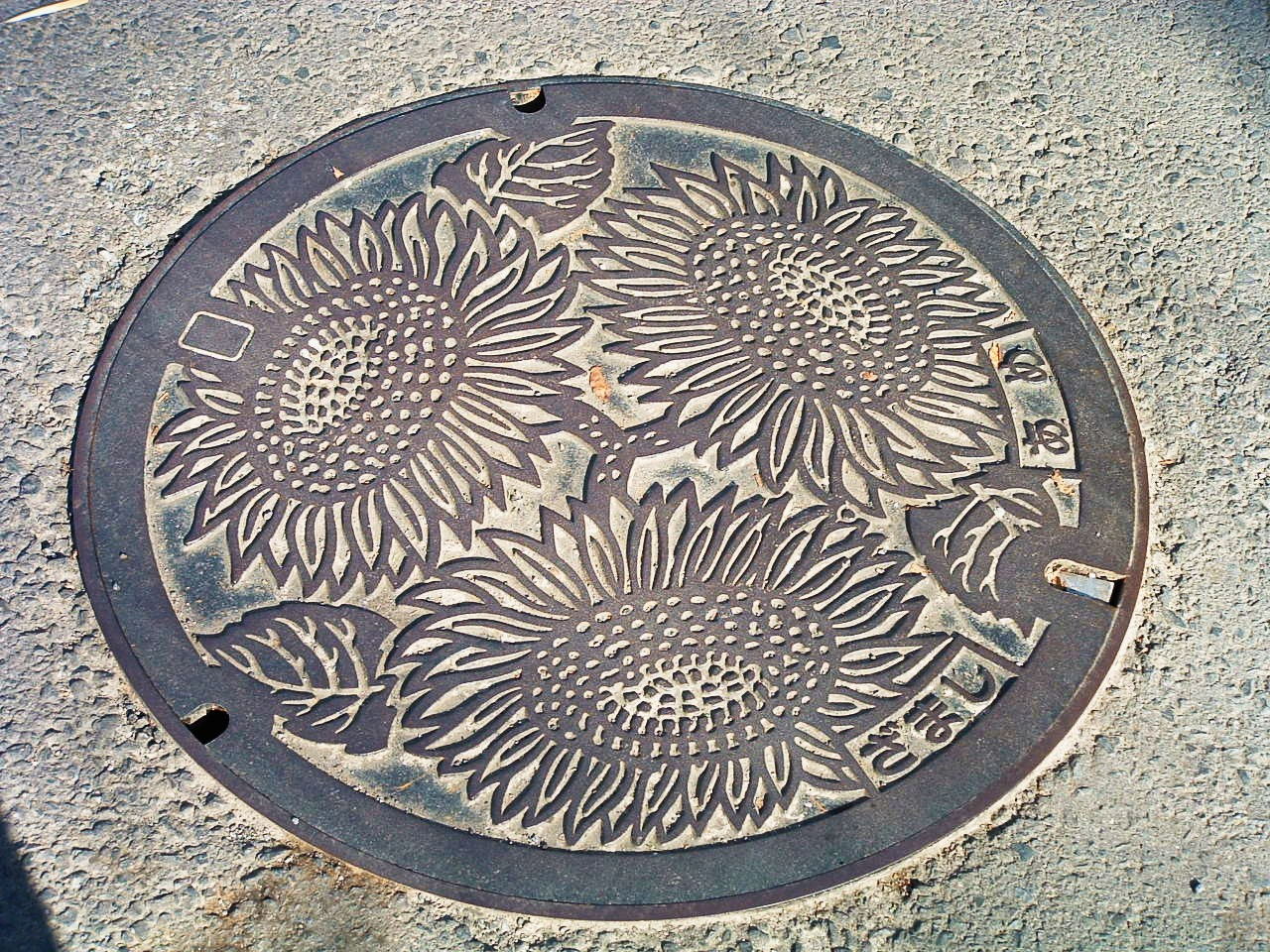
Manhole cover depicting sunflowers, a symbol of Zama

Neighborhood in the vicinity of Soubudai-mae train station

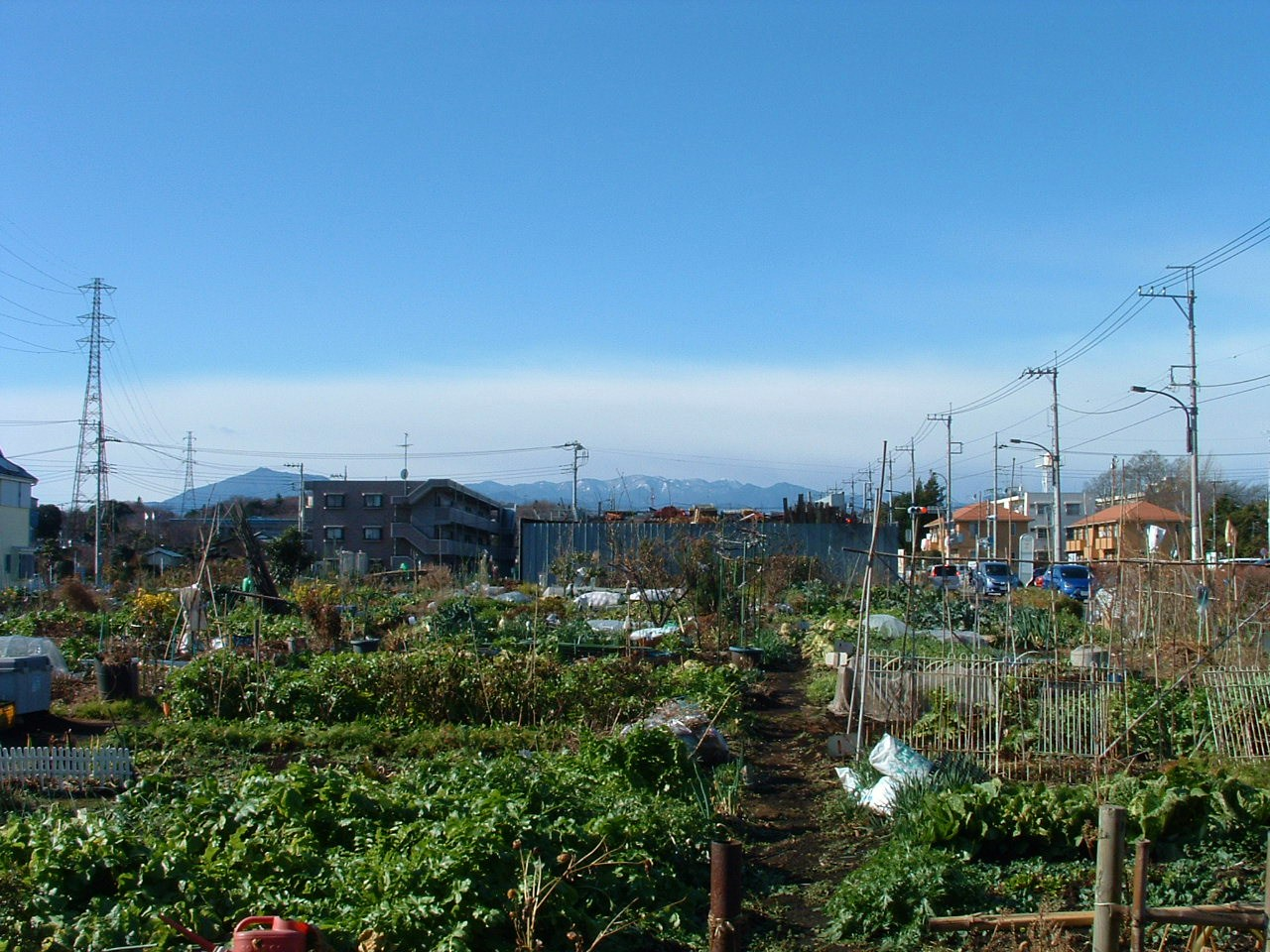
Vegetable plots near Midori-ga-oka neighborhood

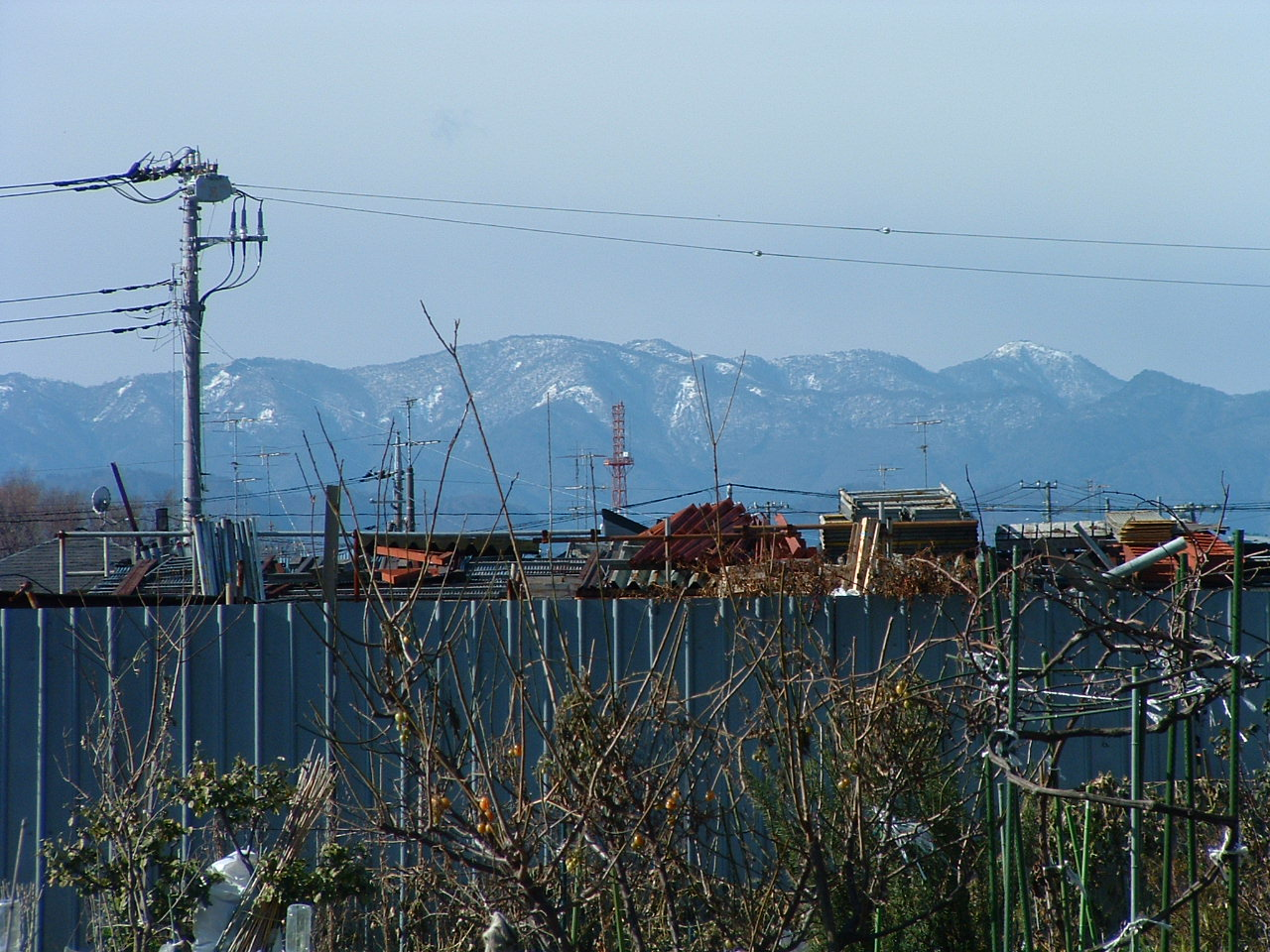
View of the distant mountains

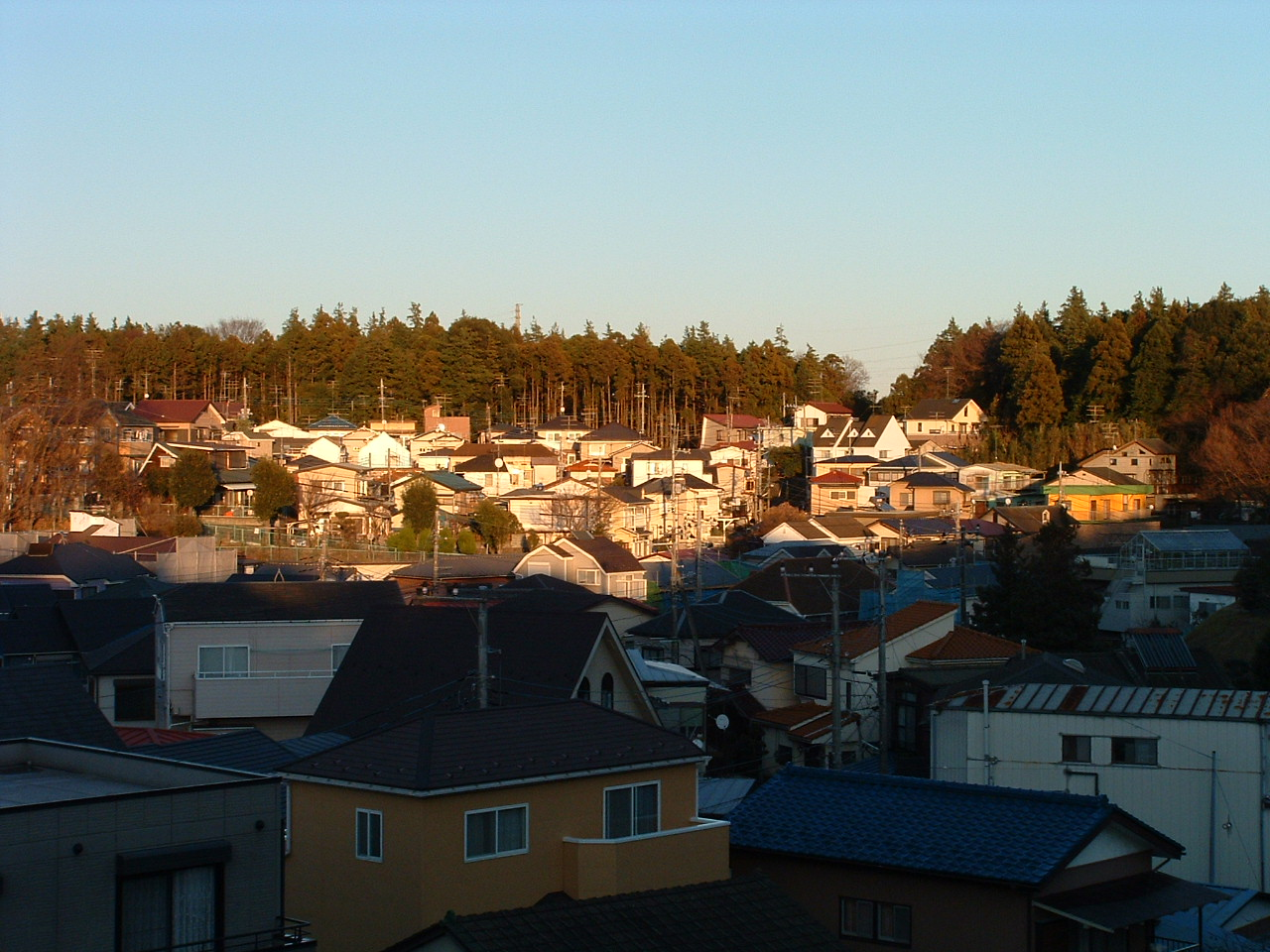
View of a neighborhood within a short walk of Soubudai-mae train station
