= Sagamihara Housing Area =

American military installation in Japan

Coordinates: 35°31′16″N 139°29′04″E

Sagamihara Housing Area (SHA) is an area of land designated as living space for United States Military personnel and Department of the Army Civilians in Sagamihara, Kanagawa prefecture, Japan. Married American soldiers who are stationed at Camp Zama may live on SHA instead of living on the main post (although some Married Soldiers do live on Camp Zama). Camp Zama, SHA and Sagami Depot all fall under the command of United States Army Garrison-Japan (USAG-J), the installation management command for the United States Army, Japan (USARJ).

== Location ==
SHA is located approximately 3 kilometers away from Camp Zama. There is no military operated transportation directly to or from SHA to Camp Zama or Sagami Depot. The closest train station to SHA is Odakyū-Sagamihara Station on the Odakyu train line. Military operated buses transport children to the schools on other military installations.

== Housing ==
The housing on SHA is for both military families and families of American civilians who work for the Army. Single parents and families can live here as well as on Camp Zama; however, single soldiers and civilians without dependents (spouse, child, parent, etc.) are restricted to housing on Camp Zama. There are both attached and detached houses on SHA, ranging from two to four bedrooms and one to three bathrooms.

The Enlisted Personnel are allowed to occupy very modern quarters that were built from the late 1990s forward. Officers are required to occupy post occupation dwellings that were constructed in 1951 and 1955. Some of the officer's quarters haven't been renovated since they were constructed.

== Facilities and activities on post ==
=== Food and gas ===
The main commissary for the Camp Zama community is located on SHA. Larger than the commissaries of Camp Zama and Sagami Depot, the SHA commissary stocks approximately 6000 items. The pay at the pump gas station with a small attached convenience store is located in the same shopping area as the commissary.

=== Sports and recreation ===
SHA has large lawns and park areas that give families plenty of room to play. There are several parks for younger children throughout the housing area. There is also a pool on the post, which is open seasonally. Tennis courts are located near the school. The gym at SHA is small in comparison to the Yano Gym at Camp Zama. However, it does have the added bonus of being accessible 24 hours.

=== Dining and entertainment ===
On-post dining options include a Hunts Brothers Pizza restaurant. The single screen movie theater plays four nights a week. Many families also travel to the Naval Air Facility Atsugi, which offers a wider variety of movies.

=== Emergency services ===
The city of Sagamihara and the command of the United States Army Medical Activity - Japan (MEDDAC-J) have come to an arrangement that in case of a medical emergency, a host nation hospital will provide services for American patients. This can be confusing at first, but is necessary because Camp Zama and its satellite posts do not offer urgent or emergency care. The BG Crawford F. Sams Army Health Clinic located on Camp Zama offers acute outpatient care only. There is a fire team on post for rapid response to fire emergencies, as well as military police (MPs).

=== Seasonal activities ===
Though many of the seasonal celebrations and holiday recognitions take place on Camp Zama, the SHA community does have its fair share. At the beginning of the winter holiday season, there is a tree lighting for the SHA tree located near the gate. SHA also hosts its own Easter egg hunt and trick-or-treating during the appropriate times.

== Services for children ==
=== Education ===
The DoDEA is the area school district.

Students from Camp Zama, Sagami Depot, and SHA attend John O. Arnn Elementary School (Preschool - 5th grade) in SHA as there are no elementary schools in the other two posts. A new school was built and opened in 2004. It two stories and more recreation and classroom areas. It is complete with a large playground area, a grass field, basketball court with two full courts and 3 "mini courts" that cover the sides, and a running track that is specifically designed for running a mile during physical education.

=== School Age Services ===
Also known as SAS, this program is devoted to keeping kids pro-active and teaching them how to be responsible adults. SAS is a fun place for kids from ages 6–12. They are located across the street from the School.

== See also ==
- Camp Zama
- Sagami General Depot
- United States Forces Japan

== References and resources ==
- Facilities available at USAG-J installations
- Monthly magazine for the Camp Zama community, The Bugle
- Child and Youth Services information
