= Sagamihara Chindenti Dam =

Dam in Kanagawa Prefecture, Japan

Sagamihara Chindenti
- Location within Japan
- Official name: 相模原沈でん池
- Location: Kanagawa Prefecture, Japan
- Coordinates: 35°32′03″N 139°23′15″E
- Opening date: 1954

Dam and spillways
- Type of dam: Embankment
- Height: 19.5 m (64 ft)
- Length: 255 m (837 ft)

Reservoir
- Creates: Sagamihara Chinden Pond
- Total capacity: 883,000 m^{3} (31,200,000 cu ft)
- Surface area: 12 hectares (30 acres)

Sagamihara Chindenti (Japanese: 相模原沈でん池) is an earthfill dam located in Kanagawa Prefecture in Japan. The dam is used for water supply. The dam impounds about 12 ha of land when full and can store 883 thousand cubic meters of water. The construction of the dam was completed in 1954.

== See also ==
- List of dams in Japan
