= Ohmatazawa Dam =

Dam in Kanagawa Prefecture, Japan

- Location within Japan
- Official name: 大又沢ダム
- Location: Kanagawa Prefecture, Japan
- Coordinates: 35°26′06″N 139°0′53″E
- Construction began: 1914
- Opening date: 1917

Dam and spillways
- Type of dam: Arch Gravity
- Height: 18.7 m (61 ft)
- Length: 90.4 m (297 ft)

Reservoir
- Total capacity: 90,000 m^{3} (3,200,000 cu ft)
- Catchment area: 16 km^{2} (6.2 sq mi)
- Surface area: 2 hectares (4.9 acres)

Ohmatazawa Dam (Japanese: 大又沢ダム) is a gravity dam located in Kanagawa Prefecture in Japan. The dam is used for power production. The catchment area of the dam is 16 km^{2}. The dam impounds about 2 ha of land when full and can store 90 thousand cubic meters of water. The construction of the dam was started on 1914 and completed in 1917.

== See also ==
- List of dams in Japan
