= Tsukuiko Shiroyama park =

Park in Japan

- Interactive map of Tsukuiko Shiroyama park
- Location: Kanagawa Prefecture, Japan
- Coordinates: 35.58357°N 139.2780°E
- Area: 47.5 hectares (117 acres)

Tsukuiko Shiroyama park (Japanese:県立津久井湖城山公園) is located in Kanagawa Prefecture in Japan. The park has an area of about 47.5 ha.

The park includes an exhibition hall, and remnants of an old castle. Various wild birds are spotted in the park.
