= Lake Sagami =

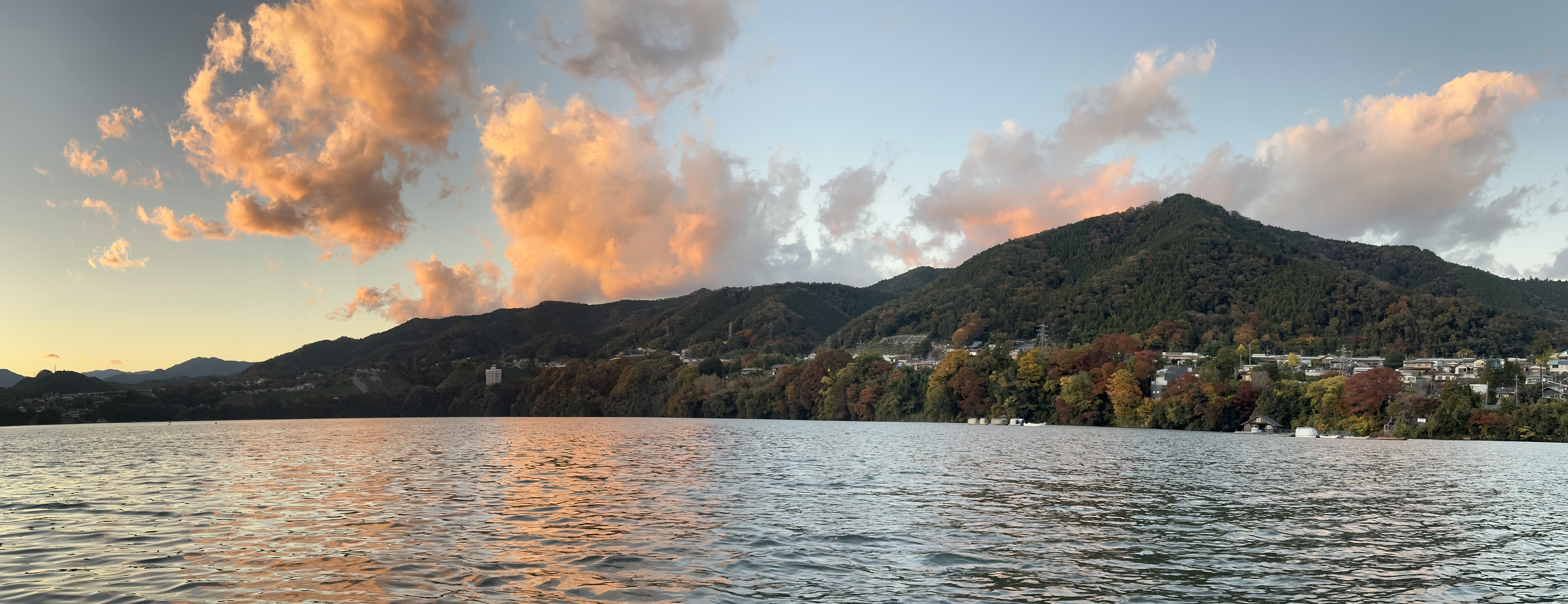
- (2025)

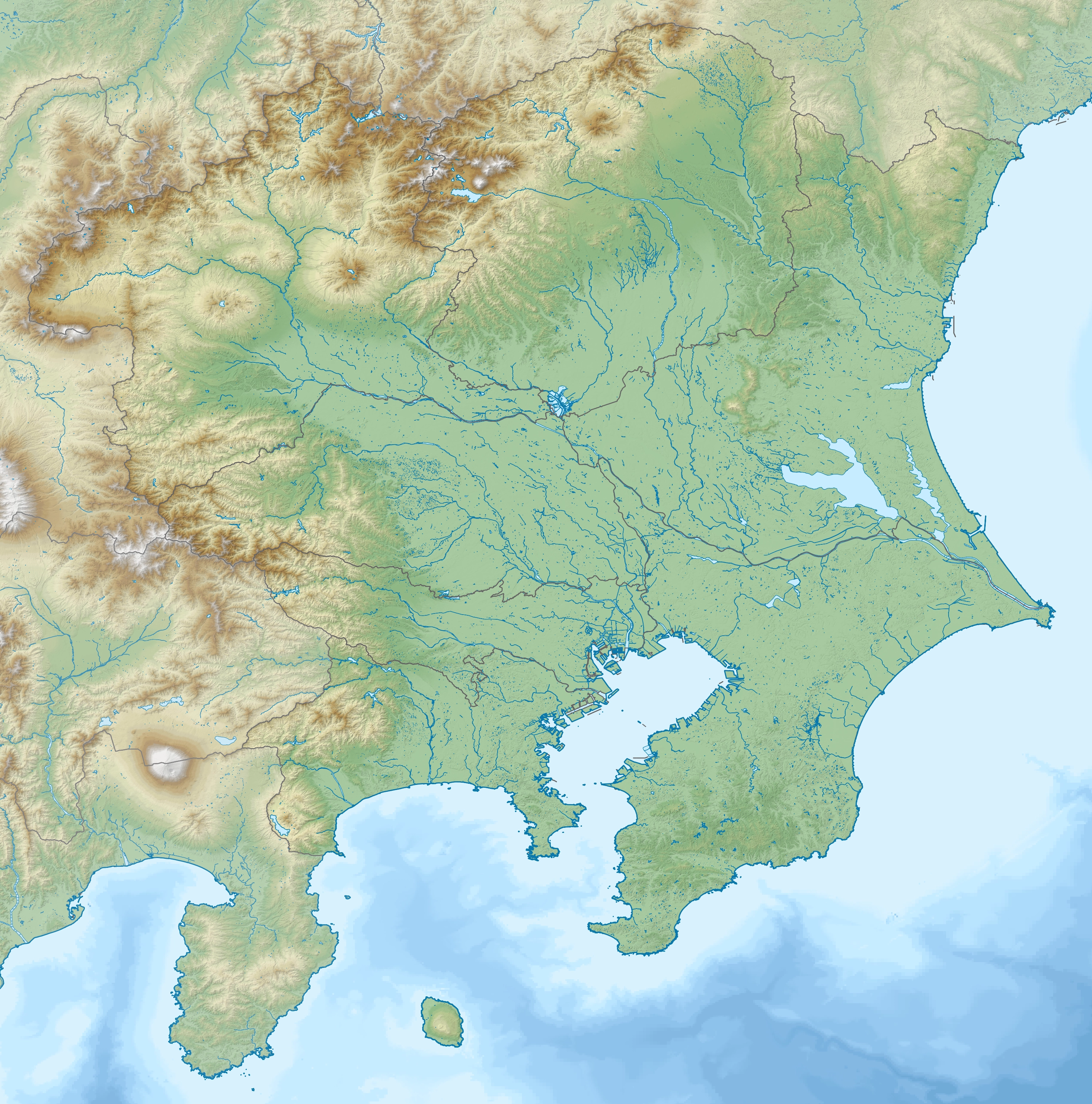
- Location within Kanto Area
- Location: Kanagawa
- Coordinates: 35°36′50″N 139°11′0″E
- Type: reservoir
- Primary inflows: Sagami River
- Primary outflows: Sagami River
- Catchment area: 1.064 km^{2} (0.411 mi^{2})
- Basin countries: Japan
- Surface area: 3 km^{2} (1.2 mi^{2})
- Average depth: 19 m (62 ft)
- Max. depth: 32 m (105 ft)
- Water volume: 63,200,000 m^{3} (1.67×10^{10} US gal)
- Residence time: 0.05 year
- Shore length^{1}: 34.4 km (21.4 mi)
- Surface elevation: 167 m (548 ft)
- Frozen: never
- Settlements: Sagamihara
- ^{1} Shore length is not a well-defined measure.

Lake Sagami (相模湖, Sagami-ko) is an artificial lake located in Midori-ku, Sagamihara, Kanagawa in Japan's Kantō region. Created in 1947 after the Sagami River was dammed, it serves as use for recreational and hydroelectric purposes. The lake also served as venue for canoeing events at the 1964 Summer Olympics held in Tokyo, located 60 kilometres (37 mi) from the lake.

== Water and land usage surrounding the lake ==
Typical lake flows (in m^{3}/s) are 85 hydroelectric, 10.34 domestic, 4.16 irrigation, and 2.15 industrial. Land usage is 87.5% natural, 4.6% agricultural, and 7.9% other. Eutrophication issues have been a serious issue of the lake that was first observed in 1967. The main issue was microcystis algae bloom and reached its highest cell count of 2,500,000 cells/mL in July–October 1979 (data from 1985). Most vegetation grown around the lake are grassland and weeds while most crops grown are rice and vegetables. Fertilizer application for crops near the lake is moderate.

== Recreational uses ==
The lake's creation in 1947 displaced the careers of many local fishermen in the area. In return for their livelihood being taken away, many of these families were offered rental boats in the new lake. No private boats are allowed on the lake as a result. To compensate for the loss of the smelt, black bass from the United States was imported to the lake as was Prussian carp. Because of the bass, the lake is a popular recreational fishing area. The lake is also used for couples dating for boat rides and families. Row boat standard daily rental rates are ¥3000 for one person, ¥4500 for two people, and ¥6000 for three people.

Several scenes of the lake, 2025

== Water treatment ==
In 1984, there were 170 industrial and four municipal sewage treatment plants surrounding the lake.
