= Shōnan =

Coastal region in Kanagawa, Japan

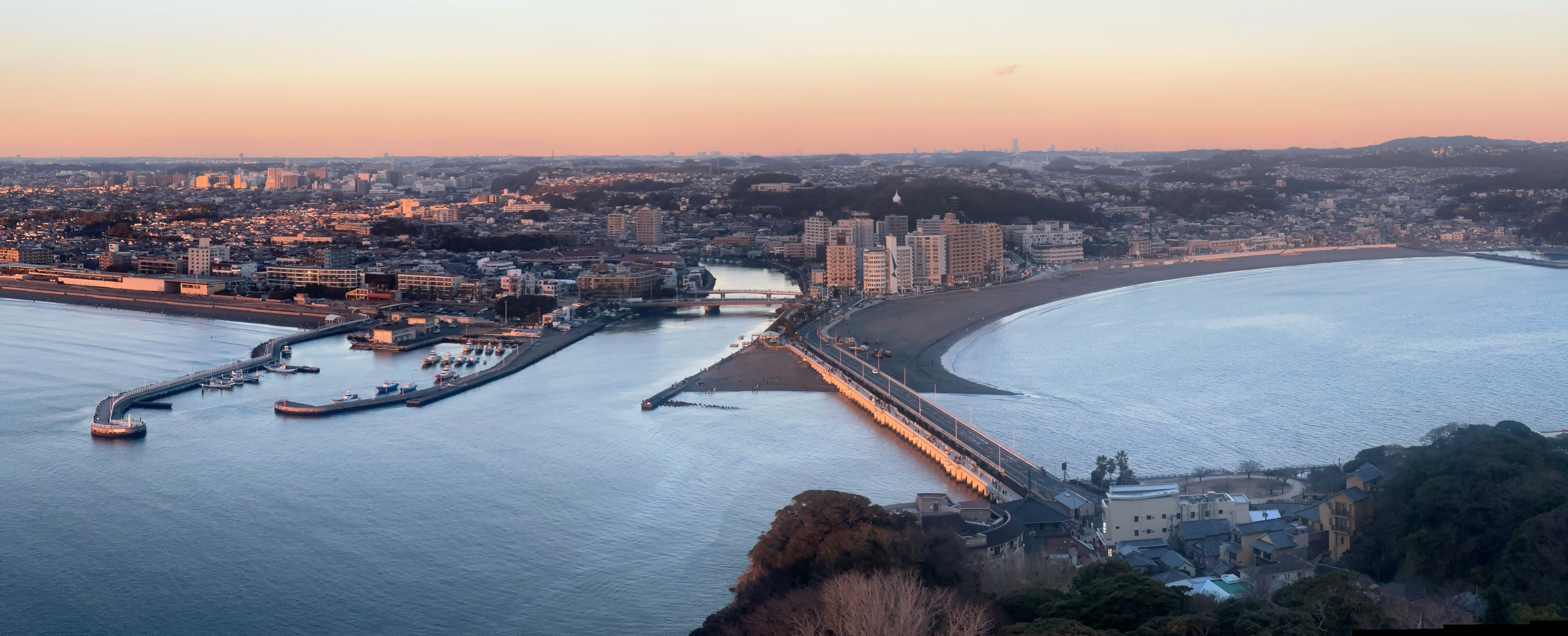
View of Shōnan from Enoshima Sea Candle, 2024

Geographic distribution of license plates in Kanagawa, Shōnan in green

Shōnan (湘南) is the name of a region along the coast of Sagami Bay in Kanagawa Prefecture, central Japan. Centered on Sagami River, about 60 kilometers southwest of Tokyo, the Shōnan region stretches from Ninomiya in the west to Fujisawa in the east, including Ōiso, Hiratsuka, and Chigasaki. Because of the bay, the region benefits from a mild climate and long beaches covered with dark volcanic sand.

== Overview ==
The name "Shonan" of this Japanese region already existed in the 17th century, relative to Shigitatsu-an, according to Ōiso Town.

During the 1880s, when the custom of swimming in the ocean was introduced into Japan, the "Shonan" region became a resort area for the politicians and rich people from Tokyo.

In postwar times, the Shōnan region gained prominence in Ishihara Shintaro's prize-winning 1955 novel, Taiyō no Kisetsu (Season of the Sun). The novel, which was also made into a popular movie, portrayed the hedonistic lifestyle of young sun-worshippers from elite families (taiyo-zoku, the "sun-tribe"), who hung out on Shōnan beaches. Lying as it does on the edge of the Tokyo-Yokohama metropolitan area, the Shōnan region is nowadays a leading resort area, oriented to surfing, sailboating, and other water sports.

== Etymology ==
There are two theories about the etymology of Shōnan (Japanese: 湘南). One is that Kanagawa Prefecture where the Shōnan region is located was, until the first half of the 19th century, called Sagami-no-kuni (相模国) or Sōshū (相州) (as that phrase remains in Sagami River and Sagami Bay) and, that Shōnan was in the south (南) of Sōshū (the water sign 氵 of the Kanji radicals having been added to "相" to make it more poetic). The other theory is that Shōnan comes from Xiangnan County (湘南県) of the old Province/Country of Changsha (長沙国) in southern China.

In the latter theory, the region's name, Shōnan, derives from a supposedly scenic region in Hunan, China, encapsulated in the phrase 瀟湘湖南 (Chinese pinyin: "xiāo xiāng hú nán"; Japanese: "shōshō konan"). This phrase refers to a beautiful area on the Xiao River (瀟江) and the Xiang River (湘江) south of the Yangtze River in Hunan. Often praised in Chinese poetry of the Xiaoxiang genre, the scenery of this area became a stylized and popular subject of paintings in both medieval China and Japan, particularly as to the graphic and poetic series known as the "Eight Views of Xiaoxiang". In Japan, the scenery of the Shōnan area was thought to be similar to the scenery around the Xiao and Xiang rivers in Hunan, China; hence the term "Shōnan" (Chinese pinyin: "xiāng nán", another name for the southern Hunan region) came to be applied to the area around Enoshima in Japan.

Besides the similarity in scenery, the two areas both had flood-basin lakes. The lake in China, which still exists, is Lake Dongting. Among others, the lake is fed by the Xiang and Xiao rivers (the Xiao is a tributary of the Xiang). In Japan, the corresponding flood-basin lake (which no longer exists but was mentioned in the Enoshima Engi) was probably located along the course of the Kashio River, which flows into Sagami Bay (via the Katase River) at Enoshima.
