= Miyagase Fuku Dam =

Dam in Kanagawa Prefecture, Japan

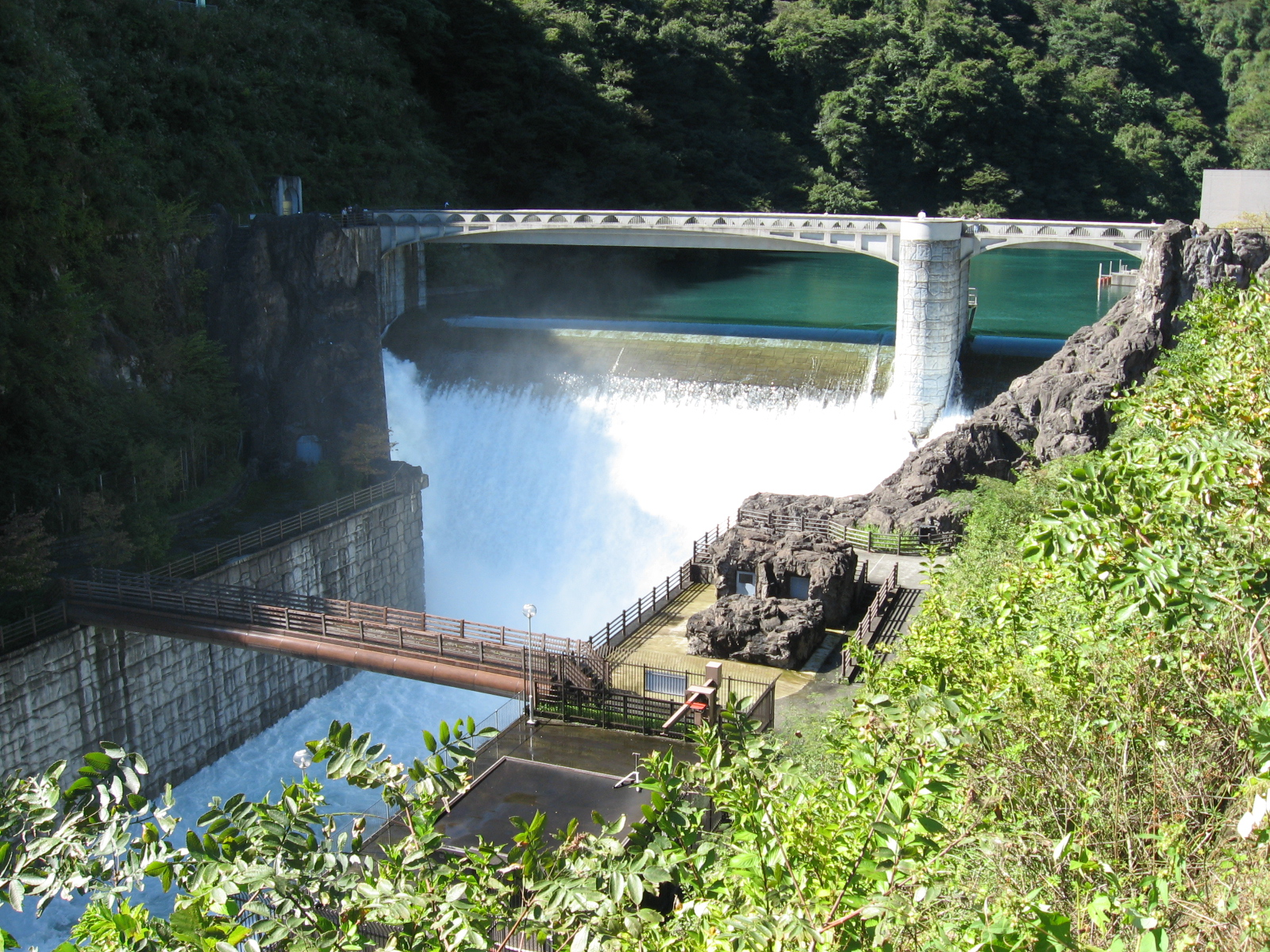

- Location within Japan
- Official name: 石小屋ダム
- Location: Kanagawa Prefecture, Japan
- Coordinates: 35°32′19″N 139°15′20″E
- Construction began: 1971
- Opening date: 2000

Dam and spillways
- Type of dam: Gravity
- Impounds: Nakatsu River
- Height: 34.5 m (113 ft)
- Length: 87 m (285 ft)

Reservoir
- Total capacity: 557,000 m^{3} (19,700,000 cu ft)
- Catchment area: 1.1 km^{2} (0.42 sq mi)
- Surface area: 4 hectares

Miyagase Fuku Dam (Japanese: 石小屋ダム) is a gravity dam located in Kanagawa Prefecture in Japan. The dam is used for flood control, water supply and power production. The catchment area of the dam is 1.1 km^{2}. The dam impounds about 4 ha of land when full and can store 557 thousand cubic meters of water. The construction of the dam was started on 1971 and completed in 2000.

== See also ==
- List of dams in Japan
