= Honzawa Dam =

Coordinates: 35°36′28″N 139°16′32″E

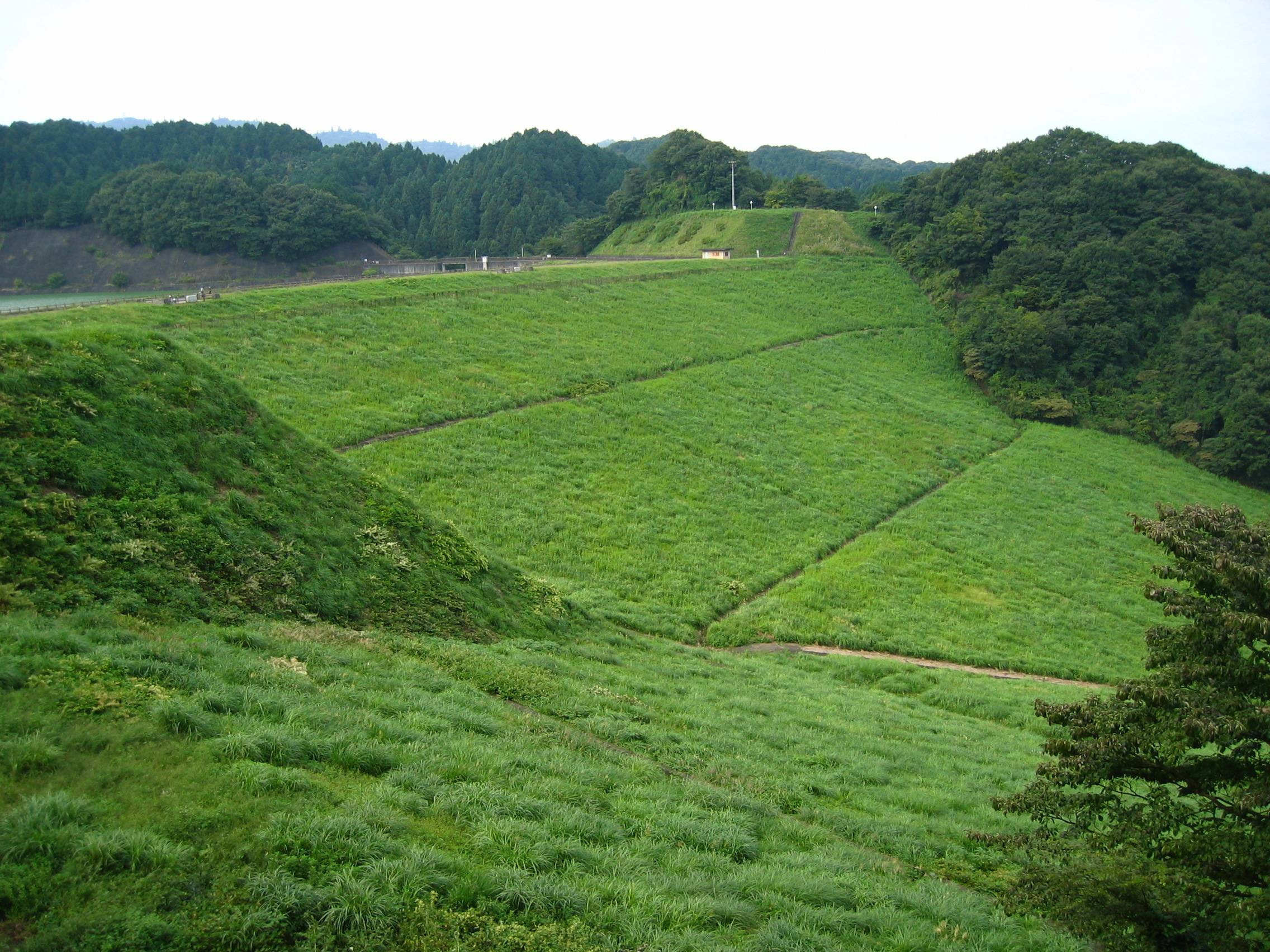
- Interactive map of Honzawa Dam
- Official name: 本沢ダム
- Location: Sagamihara, Kanagawa, Japan
- Construction began: 1960
- Opening date: 1965

Dam and spillways
- Type of dam: Embankment
- Impounds: Sakai River
- Height: 73 m (240 ft)
- Length: 234 m (768 ft)
- Dam volume: 1,852,000 m^{3} (65,400,000 ft^{3})

Reservoir
- Creates: Shiroyama Reservoir
- Total capacity: 3,927,000 m^{3} (138,700,000 ft^{3})
- Catchment area: 0.6 km^{2} (0.23 mi^{2})
- Surface area: 21 ha (52 acres)

Honzawa Dam (本沢ダム, Honzawa Damu) is a dam in Midori-ku, Sagamihara, Kanagawa Prefecture, Japan. The reservoir is called Shiroyama Lake. The hill climb to the dam from Kokura Bridge was part of the bicycle road race in the 2020 Summer Olympics.
