= Doshi Dam =

Dam in Kanagawa Prefecture, Japan

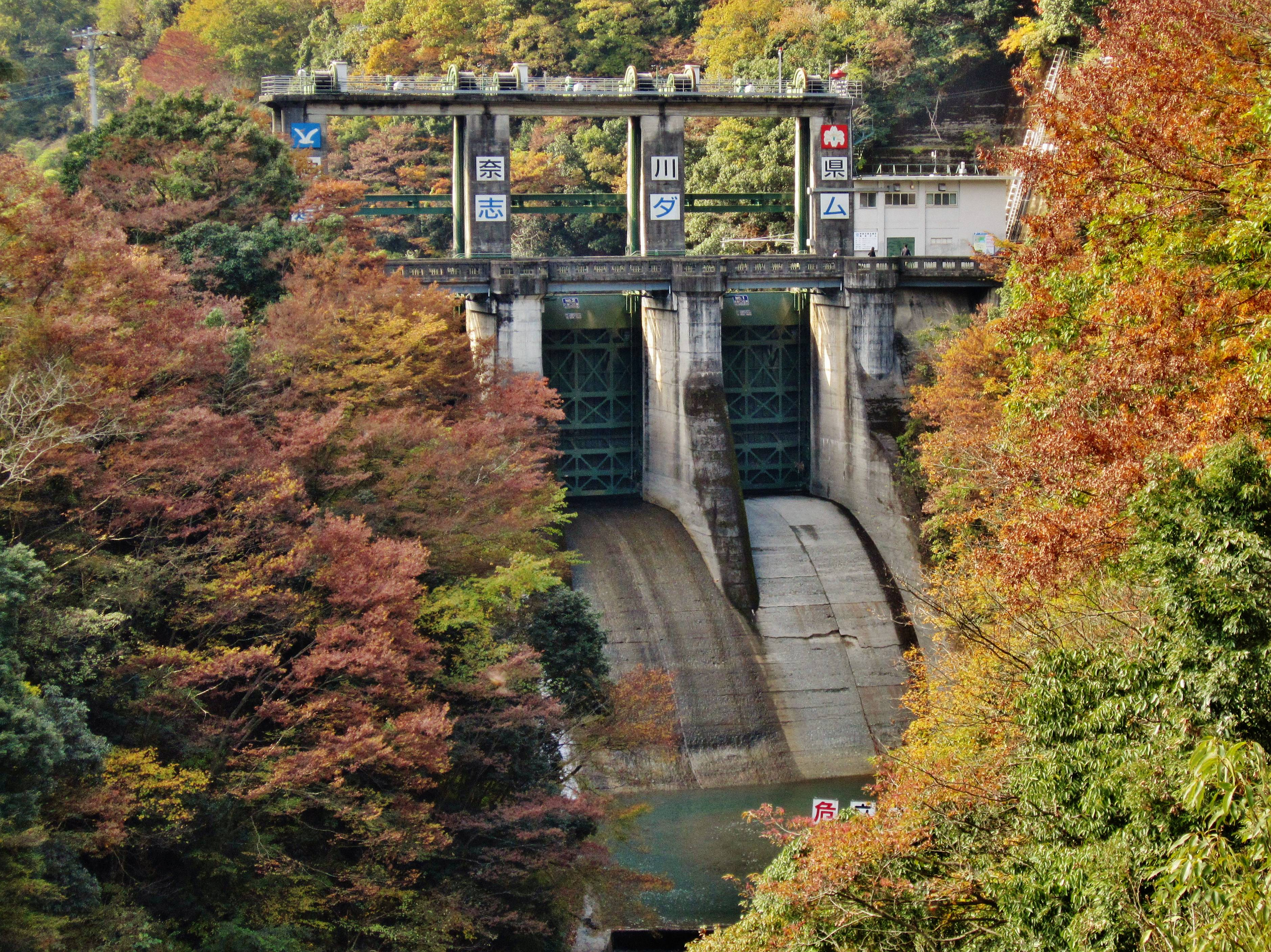

- Location within Japan
- Interactive map of Doshi Dam
- Official name: 道志ダム
- Location: Kanagawa Prefecture, Japan
- Coordinates: 35°33′02″N 139°8′01″E
- Construction began: 1952
- Opening date: 1955

Dam and spillways
- Type of dam: Gravity
- Impounds: Doshi River
- Height: 32.8 m (108 ft)
- Length: 74 m (243 ft)

Reservoir
- Creates: Okusagami Lake
- Total capacity: 1,525,000 m^{3} (53,900,000 cu ft)
- Catchment area: 112.5 km^{2} (43.4 sq mi)
- Surface area: 14 hectares

Doshi Dam (Japanese: 道志ダム) is a gravity dam located in Kanagawa Prefecture in Japan. The dam is used for power production. The catchment area of the dam is 112.5 km^{2}. The dam impounds about 14 hectares of land when full and can store 1525 thousand cubic meters of water. The construction of the dam was started on 1952 and completed in 1955.

== See also ==
- List of dams in Japan
