= Sagami Bay =

Bay in Kanagawa, Japan

Coordinates: 35°07′N 139°23′E

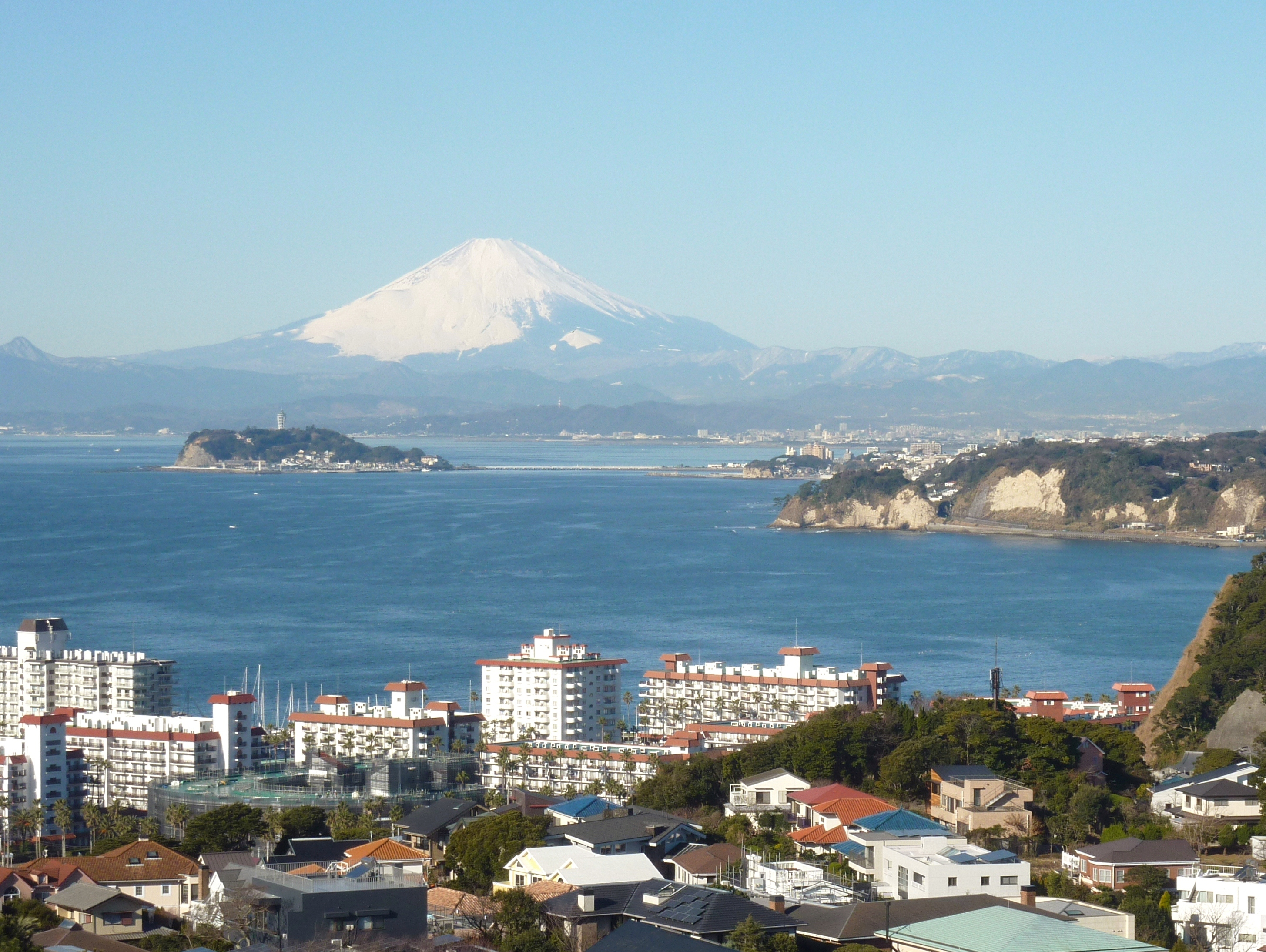
Viewed from Miura Peninsula.

Location
Location of Sagami Bay (Japan)
Location of Sagami Bay (Kanagawa)

Sagami Bay (相模湾, Sagami-wan; also known as the Sagami Gulf or Sagami Sea) lies south of Kanagawa Prefecture in Honshu, central Japan, contained within the scope of the Miura Peninsula, in Kanagawa, to the east, the Izu Peninsula, in Shizuoka Prefecture, to the west, and the Shōnan coastline to the north, while the island of Izu Ōshima marks the southern extent of the bay. It lies approximately 40 kilometres (25 mi) southwest of the capital, Tokyo. Cities on the bay include Odawara, Chigasaki, Fujisawa, Hiratsuka, Itō, and Kamakura.

== History ==
The center of the Great Kantō earthquake in 1923 was deep beneath Izu Ōshima Island in Sagami Bay. It devastated Tokyo, the port city of Yokohama, and the surrounding prefectures of Chiba, Kanagawa, and Shizuoka, and caused widespread damage throughout the Kantō region. The shallow nature of the seabed on the north of the bay, and the funnelling effect of tsunami and typhoon wave energy, contributed to certain parts of the Shonan coast suffering considerable damage, including the destruction of the Kōtoku-in temple housing the Great Buddha, or Daibutsu during the massive tsunami of 1498.

== Natural environment ==
A branch of the warm Kuroshio Current warms the bay, allowing it to host marine organisms typical of more southerly regions and giving a mild climate to the land bordering it. The maximum depth of Sagami Bay is about 1500 meters.

Organisms from sub-arctic regions are advected into the bay by intrusions of the Oyashio Current resulting in very high biodiversity. It is the major study site for research programs at the University of Tokyo (ORI) and the Japan Agency for Marine-Earth Science and Technology (JAMSTEC).

In 2004, soil samples from Sagami Bay were found to contain radioactive contamination from the Bikini Atoll nuclear tests that took place from 1946 to 1958.

The Hikiji River, Sagami River and Sakai River flow into the bay.
