= Sagami River =

River in Kanagawa and Yamanashi, Japan

Sagami River: Katsura River (桂川; upper reaches); Banyu River (馬入川; near the mouth); Ayu River (鮎川; former name)
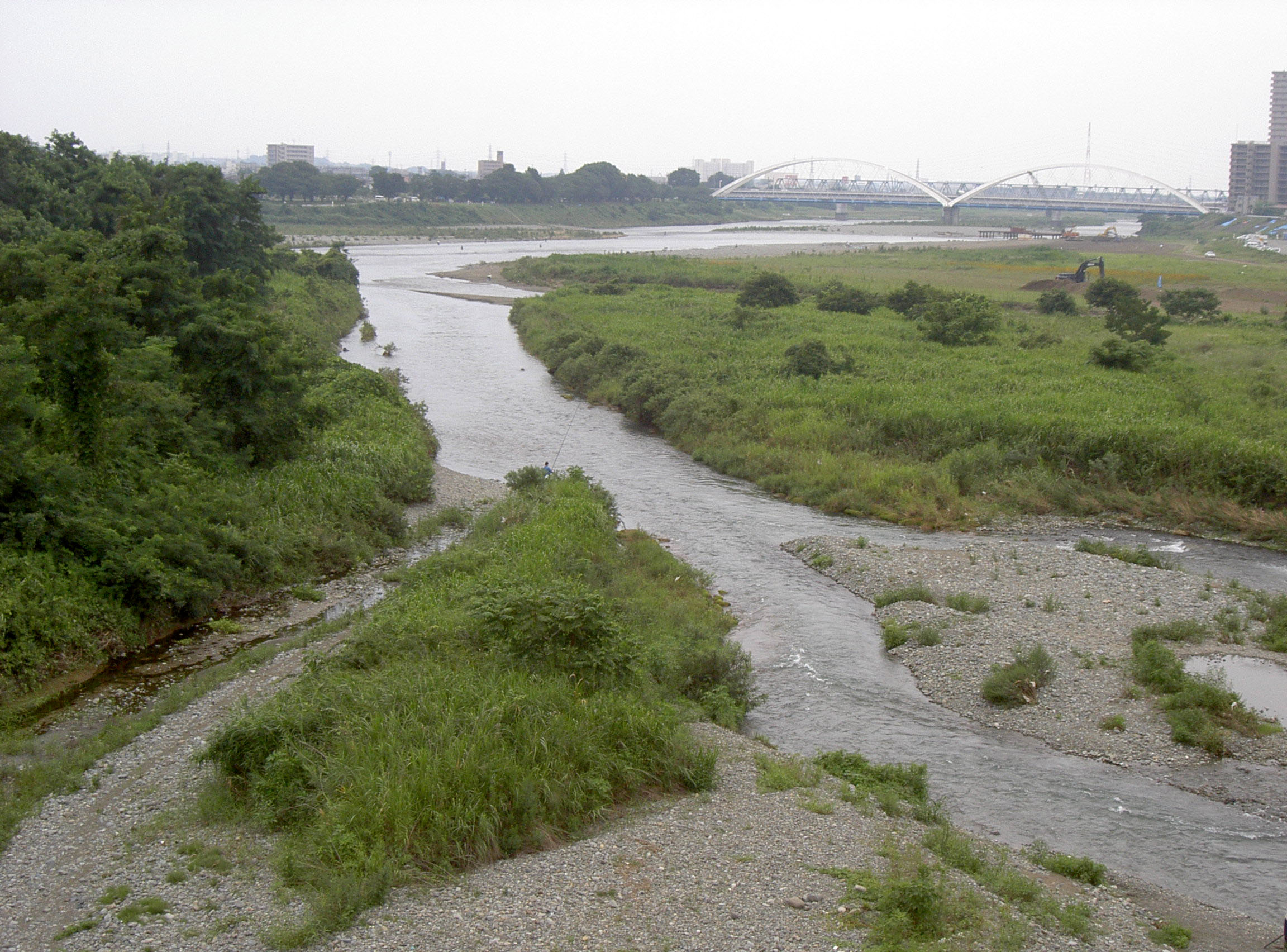
- Confluence of the Nakatsu with the Sagami at Atsugi, Kanagawa Prefecture.

- Location within Japan
- Native name: 相模川 (Japanese)

Location
- Country: Japan

Physical characteristics
- Source
  - location: Lake Yamanaka, Yamanashi Prefecture
  - elevation: 981 m (3,219 ft)
- Mouth
  - location: Sagami Bay
  - coordinates: 35°18′55″N 139°22′09″E
  - elevation: 0 m (0 ft)
- Length: 113 km (70 mi)
- Basin size: 1,680 km^{2} (650 sq mi)

Basin features
- Population: 1,330,000

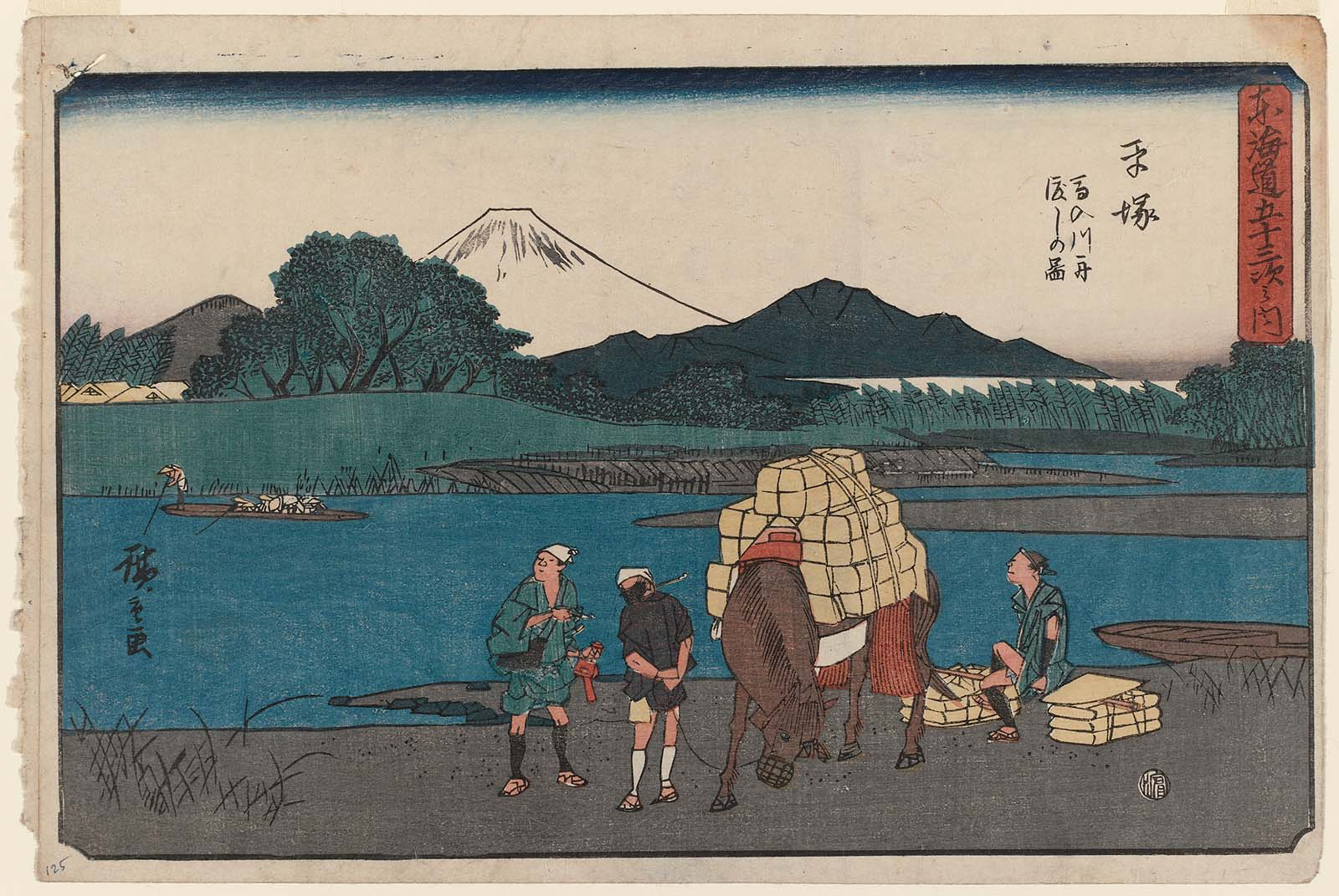
Hiroshige

The Sagami River (相模川, Sagamigawa) is a Class A river in Kanagawa and Yamanashi Prefectures on the island of Honshū, Japan.

The name Sagami come from old Sagami Province, which corresponds to present-day Kanagawa prefecture. The upper reaches of the river in Yamanashi prefecture are also sometimes known as the Katsura River (桂川, Katsuragawa), and the portion near the river mouth as the Banyu River (馬入川, Banyugawa). The river overall was sometimes referred to as the Ayu River (鮎川, Ayugawa) from the sweetfish (ayu) which were once abundant in its waters.

The Sagami River drains Lake Yamanaka, the largest and easternmost of the Fuji Five Lakes in Yamanashi Prefecture. It loops northwest, then northeast through Yamanashi, before following a generally southerly course to exit into Sagami Bay of the Pacific Ocean between the cities of Hiratsuka and Chigasaki. It is dammed at several locations along the way, forming a number of reservoir lakes, the largest of which are Lake Sagami and Lake Tsukui.

The river has had to re-cut its course several times due to repeated eruptions of Mount Fuji, and river terraces are in evidence along its upper reaches in Yamanashi. As the river crosses Kanagawa, it forms natural levees in the soft soils of the alluvial plains of central Kanagawa's Sagamino plateau, and forms almost no river delta as it exits into the ocean.

The potential of the upper reaches of the Sagami River for hydroelectric power development began to be developed in the 1930s, with the growth of industry and electrical consumption in the Yokohama-Kanagawa industrial belt, and the growing need for a reliable supply of drinking and industrial water. Work on the Sagami Dam began in 1938; however, lack of funding and the advent of World War II delayed completion until after the end of the war. In the post war period, the Shiroyama Dam was also completed on the main stream of the Sagami River in 1965. A number of dams have also been completed on the Nakatsu River, the main tributary of the Sagami River, including the Miyagase Dam.
