= Sakuragaoka Station =

Railway station in Yamato, Kanagawa Prefecture, Japan

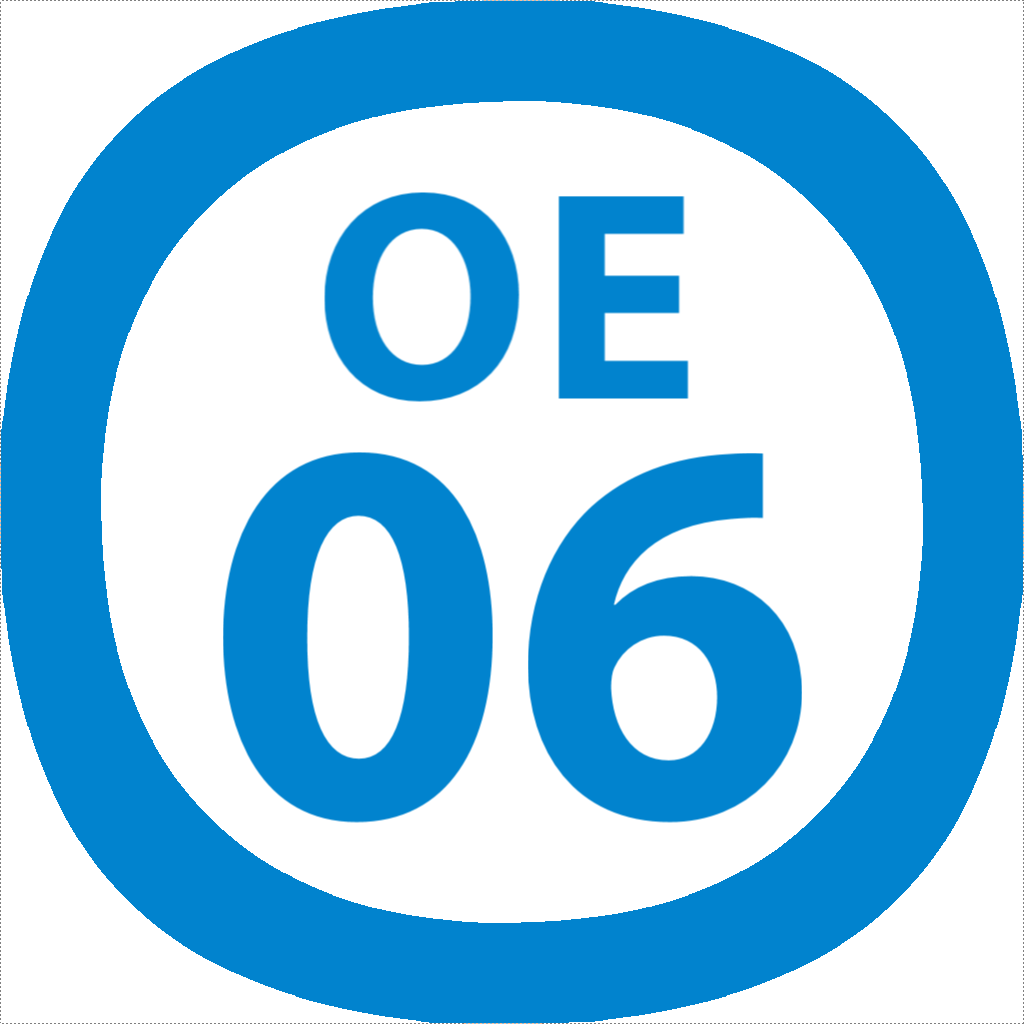
Sakuragaoka Station 桜ヶ丘駅

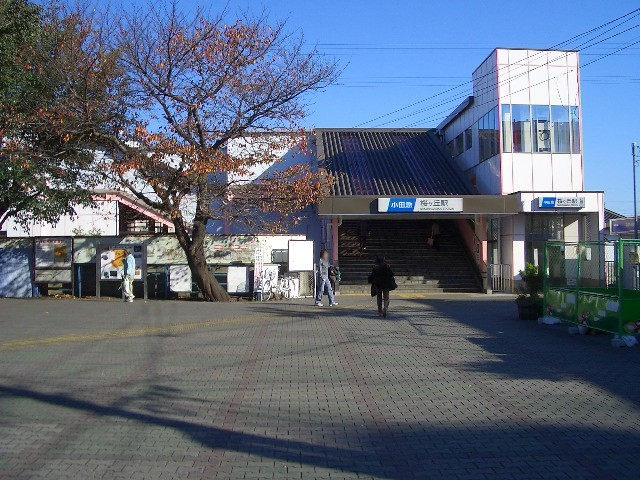
- Sakuragaoka Station

General information
- Location: Fukuda 5222, Yamato-shi, Kanagawa-ken 242-0024; Japan
- Coordinates: 35°27′02.01″N 139°27′56.69″E
- Operator: Odakyu Electric Railway
- Line: Odakyu Enoshima Line
- Distance: 42.1 km from Shinjuku
- Platforms: 2 side platforms
- Connections: Bus terminal

Other information
- Station code: OE-6
- Website: Official website

History
- Opened: November 25, 1952

Passengers
- FY2019: 20,242 daily

Services
Preceding station	Odakyu	Following station
Kōza-Shibuya towards Katase-Enoshima	Enoshima Line Local	Yamato towards Sagami-Ōno
Location
- Location within Kanagawa Prefecture Location within Japan

Sakuragaoka Station (桜ヶ丘駅, Sakuragaoka-eki) is a passenger railway station located in the city of Yamato, Kanagawa, Japan and operated by the private railway operator Odakyu Electric Railway.

== Lines ==
Sakuragaoka Station is served by the Odakyu Enoshima Line, with some through services to and from Shinjuku in Tokyo. It lies 42.1 kilometers from the Shinjuku terminus.

== Station layout ==
The station consists of two side platforms serving two tracks, which are connected to the station building by a footbridge.

=== Platforms ===
1	■ Odakyu Enoshima Line	For Fujisawa and Katase-Enoshima
2	■ Odakyu Enoshima Line	For Sagami-Ōno and Shinjuku

== History ==
Sakuragaoka Station was opened on November 25, 1952. The station building was substantially modernized in 1978.

== Passenger statistics ==
In fiscal 2019, the station was used by an average of 20,242 passengers daily.

The passenger figures for previous years are as shown below.

Fiscal year	daily average
2005	20,848
2010	20,279
2015	20,602

== Surrounding area ==
- Naval Air Facility Atsugi
- Yamato City Hall Sakuragaoka Liaison Office
- Hikichidai Park
- Yamato Stadium (secondary name: Dokaben Stadium)

== See also ==
- List of railway stations in Japan
