= Chōgo Station =

Railway station in Fujisawa, Kanagawa Prefecture, Japan

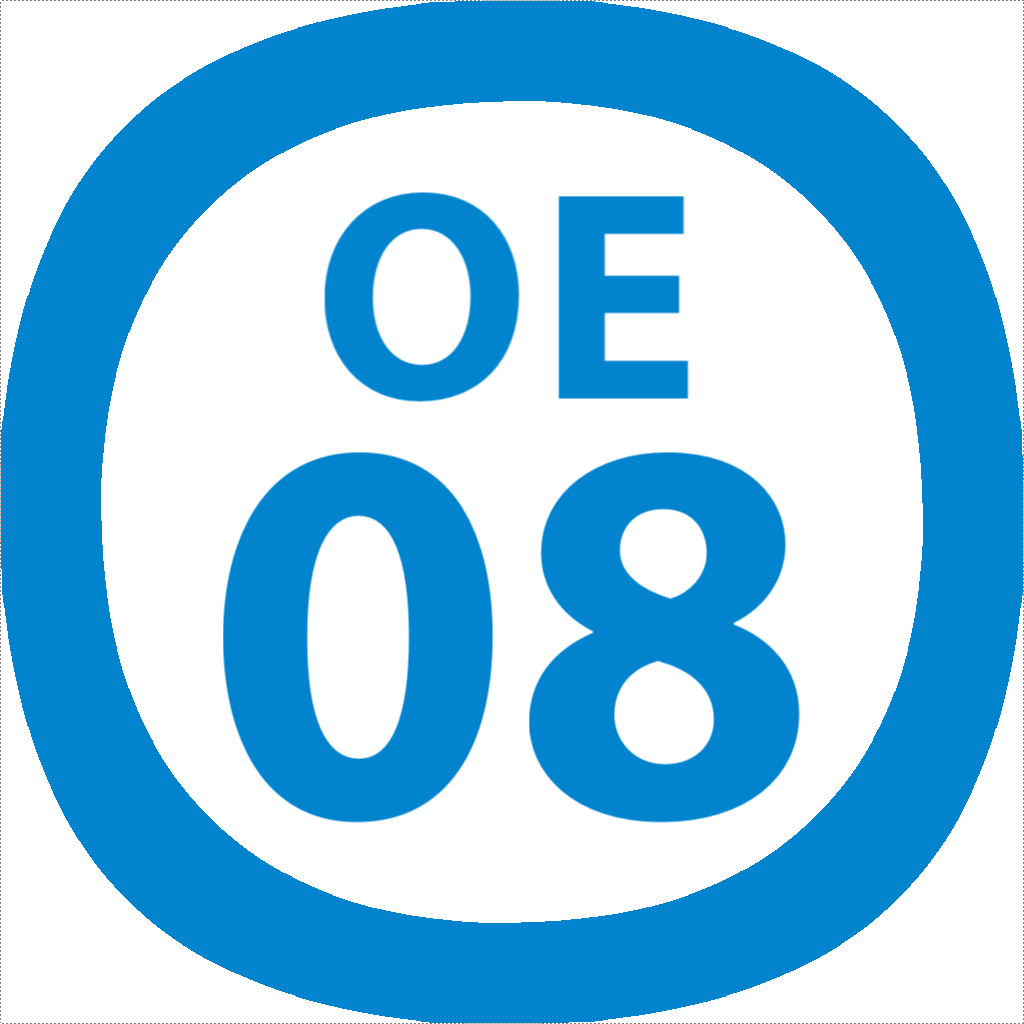
Chōgo Station 長後駅

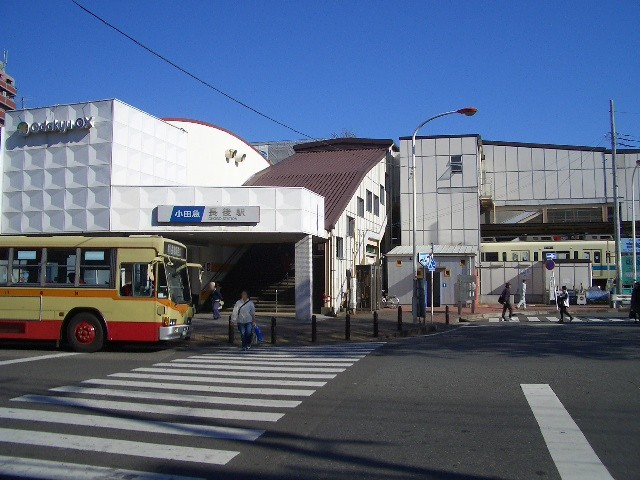
- Chōgo Station west exit, November 2004

General information
- Location: Shimotsuchidana 472, Fujisawa-shi, Kanagawa-ken 252-0807; Japan
- Coordinates: 35°24′45.12″N 139°27′55.73″E
- Operator: Odakyu Electric Railway
- Line: Odakyu Enoshima Line
- Distance: 46.3 km from Shinjuku
- Platforms: 2 island platforms
- Connections: Bus terminal

Other information
- Station code: OE-08
- Website: Official website

History
- Opened: April 1, 1929
- Former names: Shin- Chōgo (until 1958)

Passengers
- FY2019: 34,294 daily

Services
Preceding station	Odakyu	Following station
Shōnandai towards Katase-Enoshima	Enoshima Line Express	Yamato towards Sagami-Ōno
Shōnandai towards Katase-Enoshima	Enoshima Line Local	Kōza-Shibuya towards Sagami-Ōno
Location
- Location within Kanagawa Prefecture Location within Japan

Chōgo Station (長後駅, Chōgo-eki) is a passenger railway station located in the city of Fujisawa, Kanagawa, Japan and operated by the private railway operator Odakyu Electric Railway.

== Lines ==
Chōgo Station is served by the Odakyu Enoshima Line, with some through services to and from Shinjuku in Tokyo. It lies 46.3 kilometers from the Shinjuku terminus.

== Station layout ==
The station consists of two island platforms serving four tracks, which are connected to the station building by a footbridge

=== Platforms ===
1, 2	■ Odakyu Enoshima Line	For Fujisawa and Katase-Enoshima
3, 4	■ Odakyu Enoshima Line	For Sagami-Ōno and Shinjuku

== History ==
Chōgo Station was opened on April 1, 1929 as the Shin-Chōgo Station (新長後駅, Shin-Chōgo-eki). The station received its present name on April 1, 1958.

== Passenger statistics ==
In fiscal 2019, the station was used by an average of 34,294 passengers daily.

The passenger figures for previous years are as shown below.

Fiscal year	daily average
2005	35,694
2010	34,760
2015	34,839

== Surrounding area ==
- National Route 467
- Fujisawa Shonandai Hospital
- Kanagawa Prefectural Fujisawa Comprehensive High School
- Isuzu Motor Fujisawa Factory

== See also ==
- List of railway stations in Japan
