= Kōza-Shibuya Station =

Railway station in Yamato, Kanagawa Prefecture, Japan

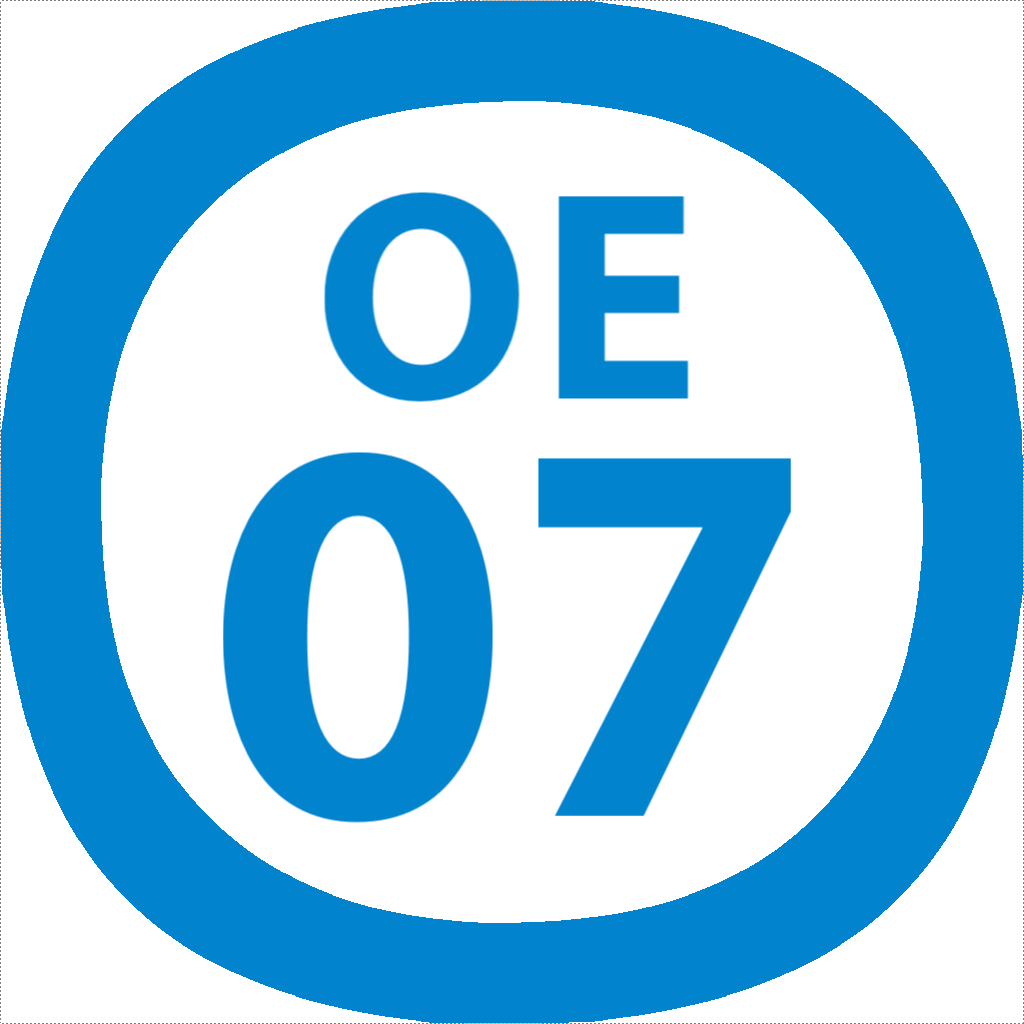
Kōza-Shibuya Station 高座渋谷駅

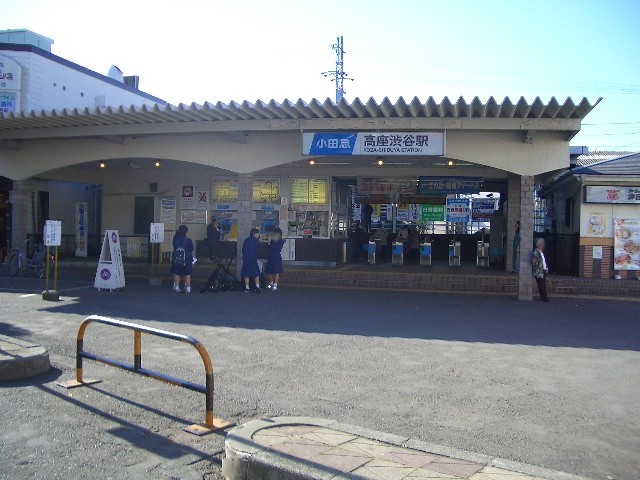
- Kōza-Shibuya Station

General information
- Location: Shibuya-chome, Yamato-shi, Kanagawa-ken 242-0023; Japan
- Coordinates: 35°25′57.05″N 139°27′53.48″E
- Operator: Odakyu Electric Railway
- Line: Odakyu Enoshima Line
- Distance: 44.1 km from Shinjuku
- Platforms: 2 side platforms
- Connections: Bus terminal

Other information
- Station code: OE-7
- Website: Official website

History
- Opened: April 1, 1929

Passengers
- FY2019: 25,520 daily

Services
Preceding station	Odakyu	Following station
Chōgo towards Katase-Enoshima	Enoshima Line Local	Sakuragaoka towards Sagami-Ōno
Location
- Location within Kanagawa Prefecture Location within Japan

Kōza-Shibuya Station (高座渋谷駅, Kōza-Shibuya-eki) is a passenger railway station located in the city of Sagamihara, Kanagawa, Japan and operated by the private railway operator Odakyu Electric Railway.

== Lines ==
Kōza-Shibuya Station is served by the Odakyu Enoshima Line, with some through services to and from Shinjuku in Tokyo. It lies 44.1 kilometers from the Shinjuku terminus.

== Station layout ==
The station consists of two side platforms serving two tracks, which are connected to the station building by a footbridge.

It is sited over the top of the Tokaido Shinkansen which doesn’t stop.

=== Platforms ===
1	■ Odakyu Enoshima Line	For Fujisawa and Katase-Enoshima
2	■ Odakyu Enoshima Line	For Sagami-Ōno and Shinjuku

== History ==
Kōza-Shibuya Station was opened on April 1, 1929.

== Passenger statistics ==
In fiscal 2019, the station was used by an average of 25,520 passengers daily.

The passenger figures for previous years are as shown below.

Fiscal year	daily average
2005	20,233
2010	21,183
2015	24,602

== Surrounding area ==
- IKOZA
- Yamato City Shibuya Library
- Yamato City Hall Shibuya Branch
- Kamiwada Wild Bird Forest Park

== See also ==
- List of railway stations in Japan
