= Mutsuai-Nichidaimae Station =

Railway station in Fujisawa, Kanagawa Prefecture, Japan

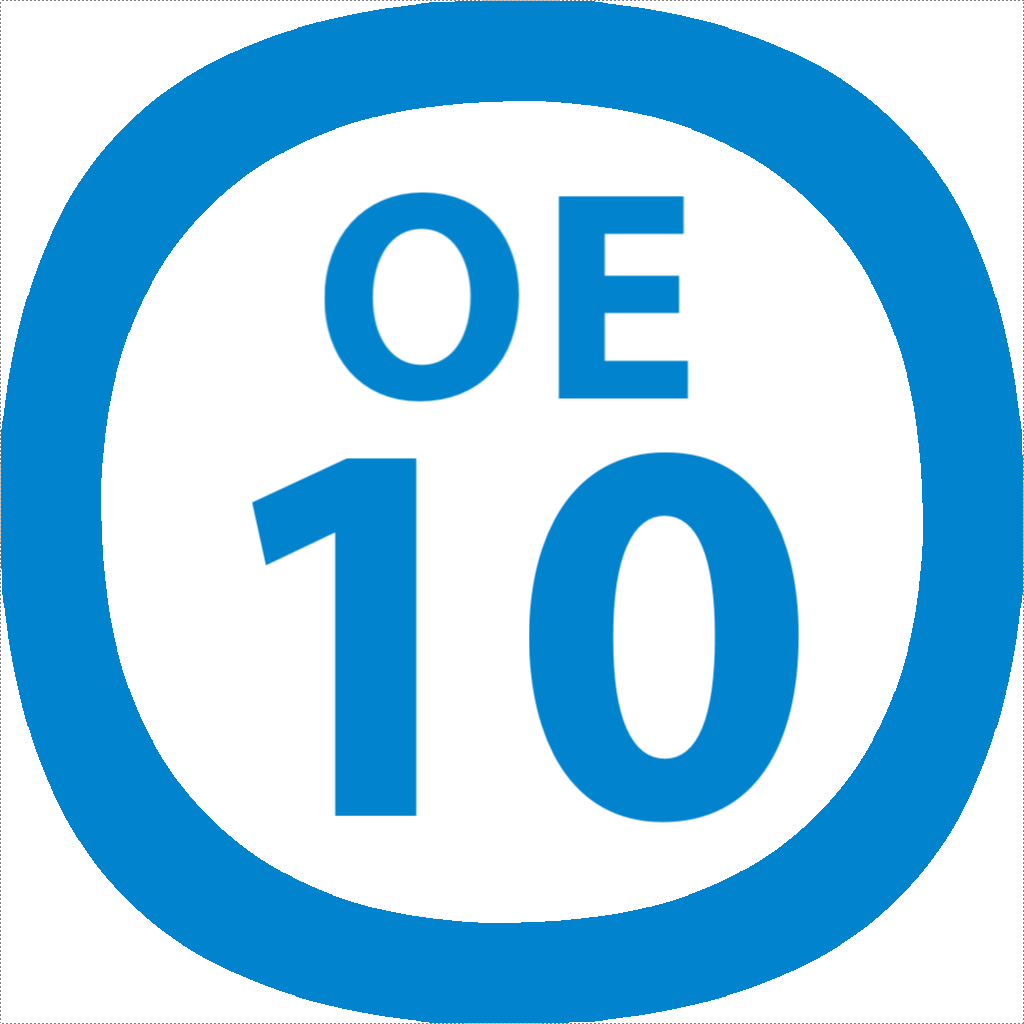
Mutsuai-Nichidaimae Station 六会日大前駅

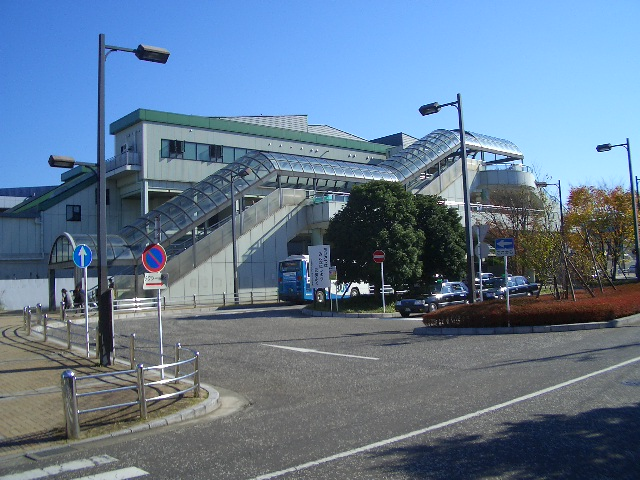
- Mutsuai-Nichidaimae Station, November 2004

General information
- Location: Kameino 1-1-1, Fujisawa-shi, Kanagawa-ken 252-0813; Japan
- Coordinates: 35°23′00.88″N 139°28′15.00″E
- Operator: Odakyu Electric Railway
- Line: Odakyu Enoshima Line
- Distance: 49.6 km from Shinjuku
- Platforms: 2 side platforms
- Connections: Bus terminal

Other information
- Station code: OE-10
- Website: Official website

History
- Opened: April 1, 1929
- Former names: Mutsuai (until 1998)

Passengers
- FY2019: 29,802 daily

Services
Preceding station	Odakyu	Following station
Zengyō towards Katase-Enoshima	Enoshima Line Local	Shōnandai towards Sagami-Ōno
Location
- Location within Kanagawa Prefecture Location within Japan

Mutsuai-Nichidaimae Station (六会日大前駅, Mutsuai-Nichidaimae-eki) is a passenger railway station located in the city of Fujisawa, Kanagawa, Japan and operated by the private railway operator Odakyu Electric Railway.

== Lines ==
Mutsuai-Nichidaimae Station is served by the Odakyu Enoshima Line, with some through services to and from Shinjuku in Tokyo. It lies 49.6 kilometers from the Shinjuku terminus.

== Station layout ==
The station consists of two opposed side platforms serving two tracks, with an elevated station building above the platforms and tracks.

=== Platforms ===
1	■ Odakyu Enoshima Line	For Fujisawa and Katase-Enoshima
2	■ Odakyu Enoshima Line	For Sagami-Ōno and Shinjuku

== History ==
Mutsuai-Nichidaimae Station was opened on April 1, 1929 as the Mutsuai Station (六会駅, Mutsuai-eki). Commuter express services were initiated in 1962 to handle the large volume of traffic commuting towards Tokyo. The station building was reconstructed in 1995. The station received its present name on August 22, 1998.

== Passenger statistics ==
In fiscal 2019, the station was used by an average of 29,802 passengers daily.

The passenger figures for previous years are as shown below.

Fiscal year	daily average
2005	27,942
2010	28,083
2015	30,555

== Surrounding area ==
- Rokukai Junior High School
- Rokukai Elementary School
- Nihon University Shonan Campus (College of Bioresource Sciences, Junior College)
- Nihon University Fujisawa High School / Junior High School
- Tama University Shonan Campus
- Fujisawa Technical High School
- Fujisawa School for the Disabled

== See also ==
- List of railway stations in Japan
