= Hon-Kugenuma Station =

Railway station in Fujisawa, Kanagawa Prefecture, Japan

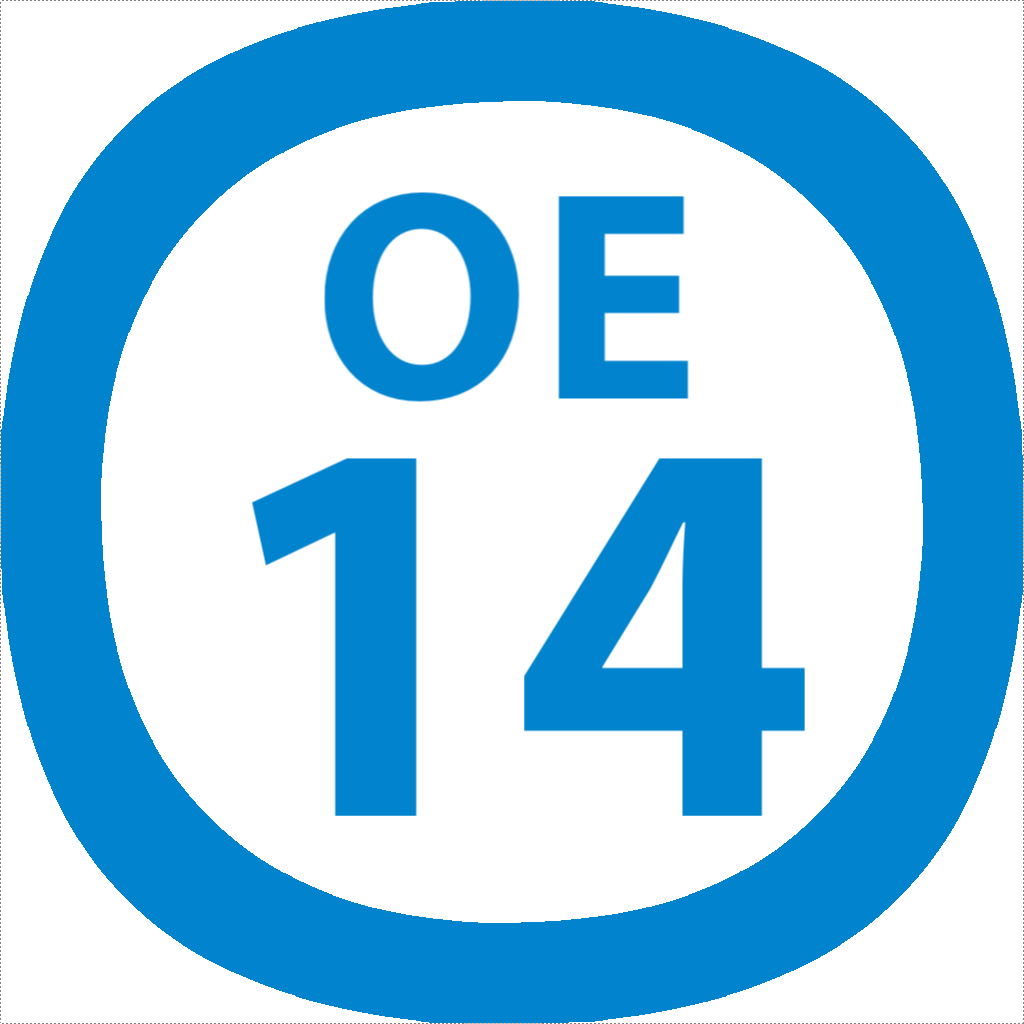
Hon-Kugenuma Station 本鵠沼駅

- Hon-Kugenuma Station, November 2026

General information
- Location: Hon-Kugenuma 2-13-14, Fujisawa-shi, Kanagawa-ken 251-0028; Japan
- Coordinates: 35°19′51.52″N 139°28′31.06″E
- Operator: Odakyu Electric Railway
- Line: Odakyu Enoshima Line
- Distance: 56.9 km from Shinjuku
- Platforms: 2 side platforms
- Connections: Bus terminal

Other information
- Station code: OE-14
- Website: Official website

History
- Opened: April 1, 1929

Passengers
- FY2019: 13,938 daily

Services
| Preceding station | Odakyu | Following station |
|---|---|---|
| Kugenuma-Kaigan towards Katase-Enoshima | Enoshima Line Local | Fujisawa towards Sagami-Ōno |
Location
- Location within Kanagawa Prefecture Location within Japan

Hon-Kugenuma Station (本鵠沼駅, Hon-Kugenuma-eki) is a passenger railway station located in the city of Fujisawa, Kanagawa, Japan and operated by the private railway operator Odakyu Electric Railway.

== Lines ==
Hon-Kugenuma Station is served by the Odakyu Enoshima Line, with some through services to and from Shinjuku in Tokyo. It lies 56.9 kilometres (35.4 mi) from the Shinjuku terminus.

== Station layout ==
Hon-Kugenuma Station has two side platforms serving two tracks, which are connected to the station building by a footbridge.

=== Platforms ===
| 1 | ■ Odakyu Enoshima Line | For Katase-Enoshima |
| 2 | ■ Odakyu Enoshima Line | For Sagami-Ōno and Shinjuku |

Platforms

== History ==
Hon-Kugenuma Station was opened on April 1, 1929. The platforms were lengthened to accept 10-car express trains in 1998.

== Passenger statistics ==
In fiscal 2019, the station was used by an average of 13,938 passengers daily.

The passenger figures for previous years are as shown below.

| Fiscal year | daily average |
|---|---|
| 2005 | 11,398 |
| 2010 | 11,733 |
| 2015 | 12,690 |

== Surrounding area ==
- Shonan Gakuen Junior and Senior High School
- Kugenuma Junior High School
- Kugenuma Elementary School
- Koyo Elementary School

== See also ==
- List of railway stations in Japan
