= Fujisawa-Hommachi Station =

Railway station in Fujisawa, Kanagawa Prefecture, Japan

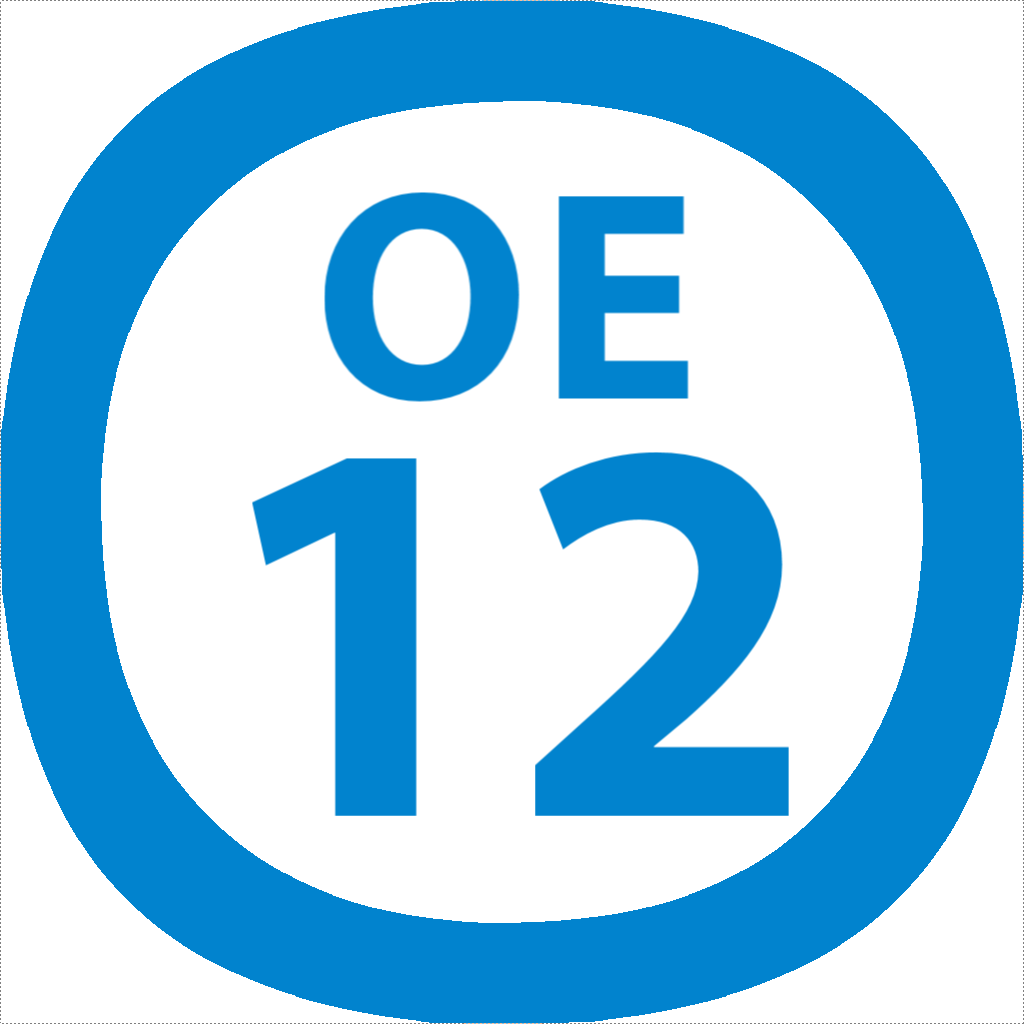
Fujisawa Hommachi Station 藤沢本町駅

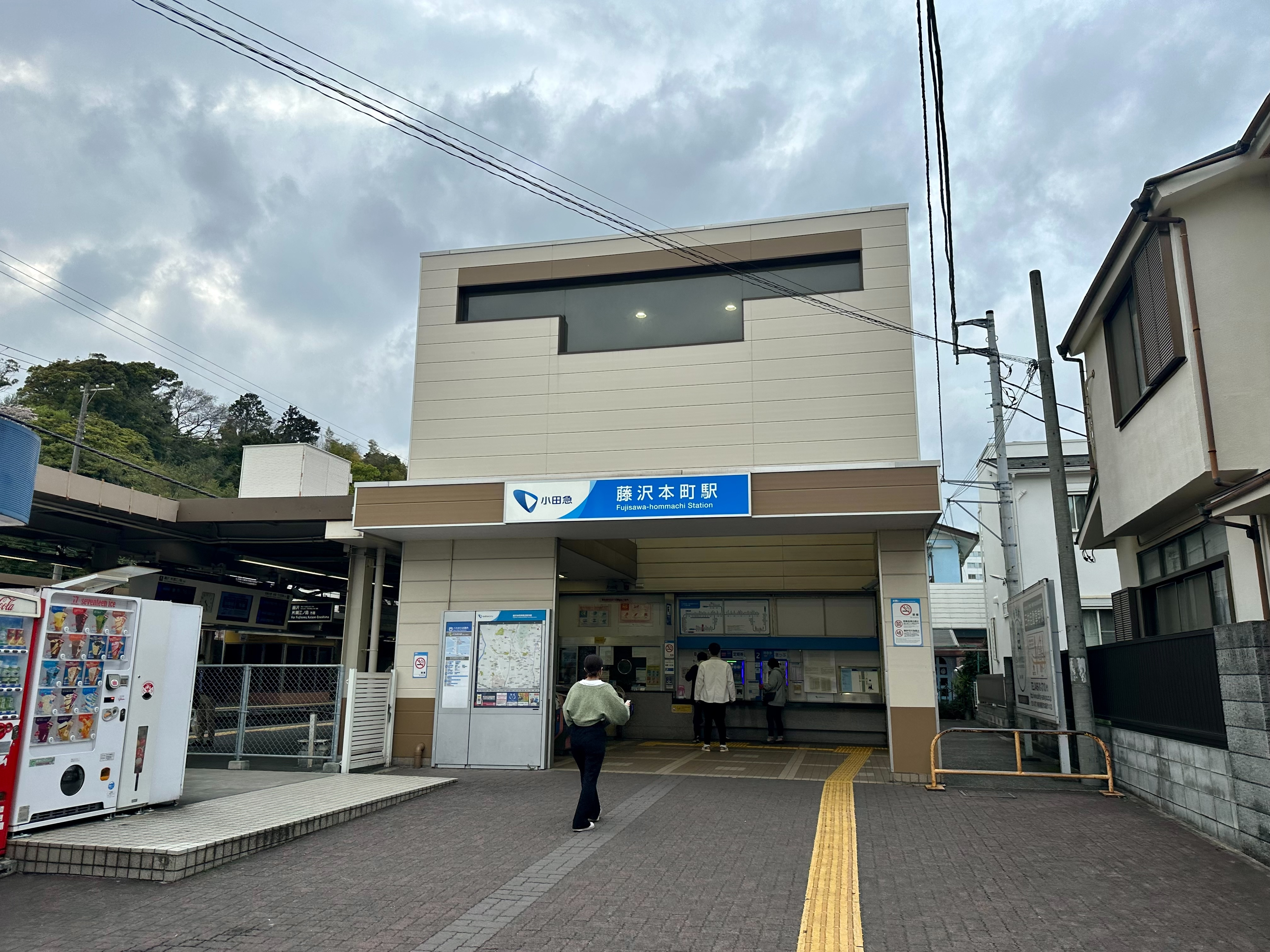
- Fujisawa-Hommachi Station, April 2023

General information
- Location: Fujisawa 3-3-2, Fujisawa-shi, Kanagawa-ken 251-0052; Japan
- Coordinates: 35°20′52.82″N 139°28′34.47″E
- Operator: Odakyu Electric Railway
- Line: Odakyu Enoshima Line
- Distance: 53.6 km from Shinjuku
- Platforms: 2 side platforms
- Connections: Bus terminal

Other information
- Station code: OE-12
- Website: Official website

History
- Opened: April 1, 1929

Passengers
- FY2019: 21,694 daily

Services
Preceding station	Odakyu	Following station
Fujisawa towards Katase-Enoshima	Enoshima Line Local	Zengyō towards Sagami-Ōno
Location
- Location within Kanagawa Prefecture Location within Japan

Fujisawa-Hommachi Station (藤沢本町駅, Fujisawa-Hommachi-eki) is a passenger railway station located in the city of Fujisawa, Kanagawa, Japan and operated by the private railway operator Odakyu Electric Railway.

== Lines ==
Fujisawa-Hommachi Station is served by the Odakyu Enoshima Line, with some through services to and from Shinjuku in Tokyo. It lies 53.6 kilometers from the Shinjuku terminus.

== Station layout ==
The station consists of two opposed side platforms serving two tracks, which are connected to the station building by a footbridge.

=== Platforms ===
1	■ Odakyu Enoshima Line	For Fujisawa and Katase-Enoshima
2	■ Odakyu Enoshima Line	For Sagami-Ōno and Shinjuku

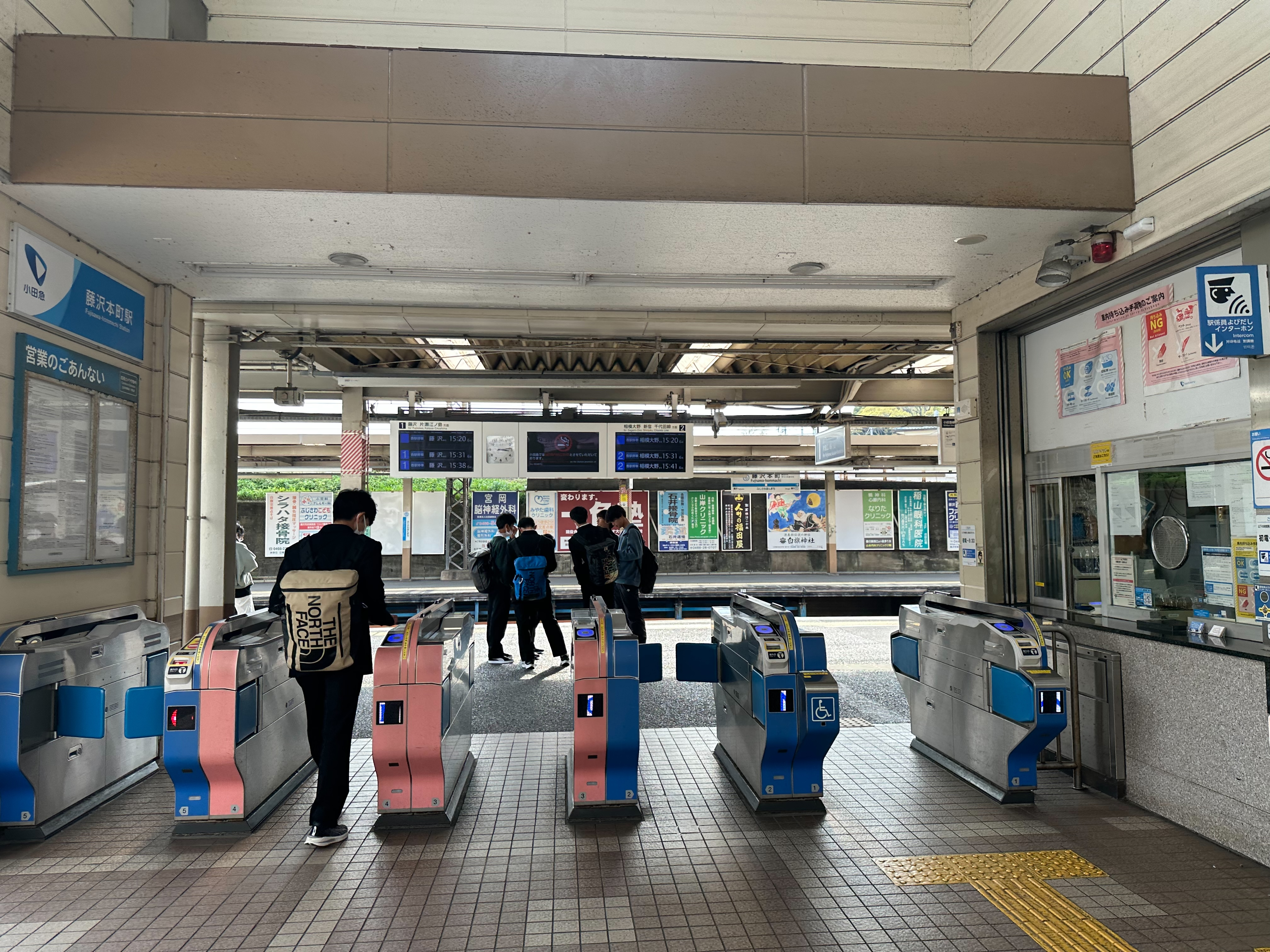
Ticket gates, 2023

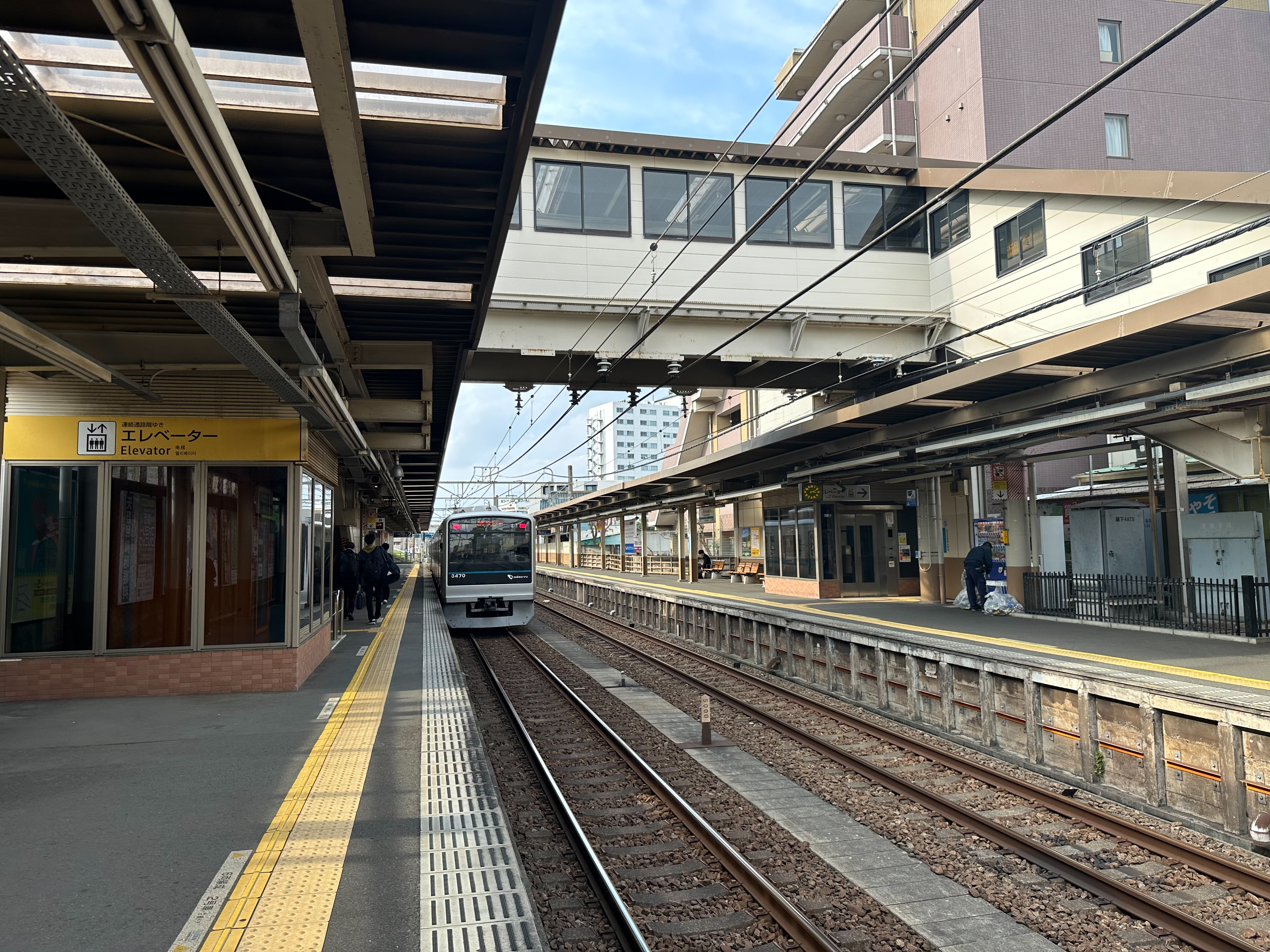
Platforms, 2023

== History ==
Fujisawa-Hommachi Station was opened on April 1, 1929. It is located near the site of the original Fujisawa-shuku on the old Tōkaidō, from which it takes its name.

== Passenger statistics ==
In fiscal 2019, the station was used by an average of 21,694 passengers daily.

The passenger figures for previous years are as shown below.

Fiscal year	daily average
2005	18,328
2010	20,113
2015	21,838

== Surrounding area ==
- Shirahata Shrine
- Kanagawa Prefectural Shonan High School
- Kanagawa Prefectural Fujisawa Seiryu High School

== See also ==
- List of railway stations in Japan
