= Higashi-Rinkan Station =

Railway station in Sagamihara, Kanagawa Prefecture, Japan

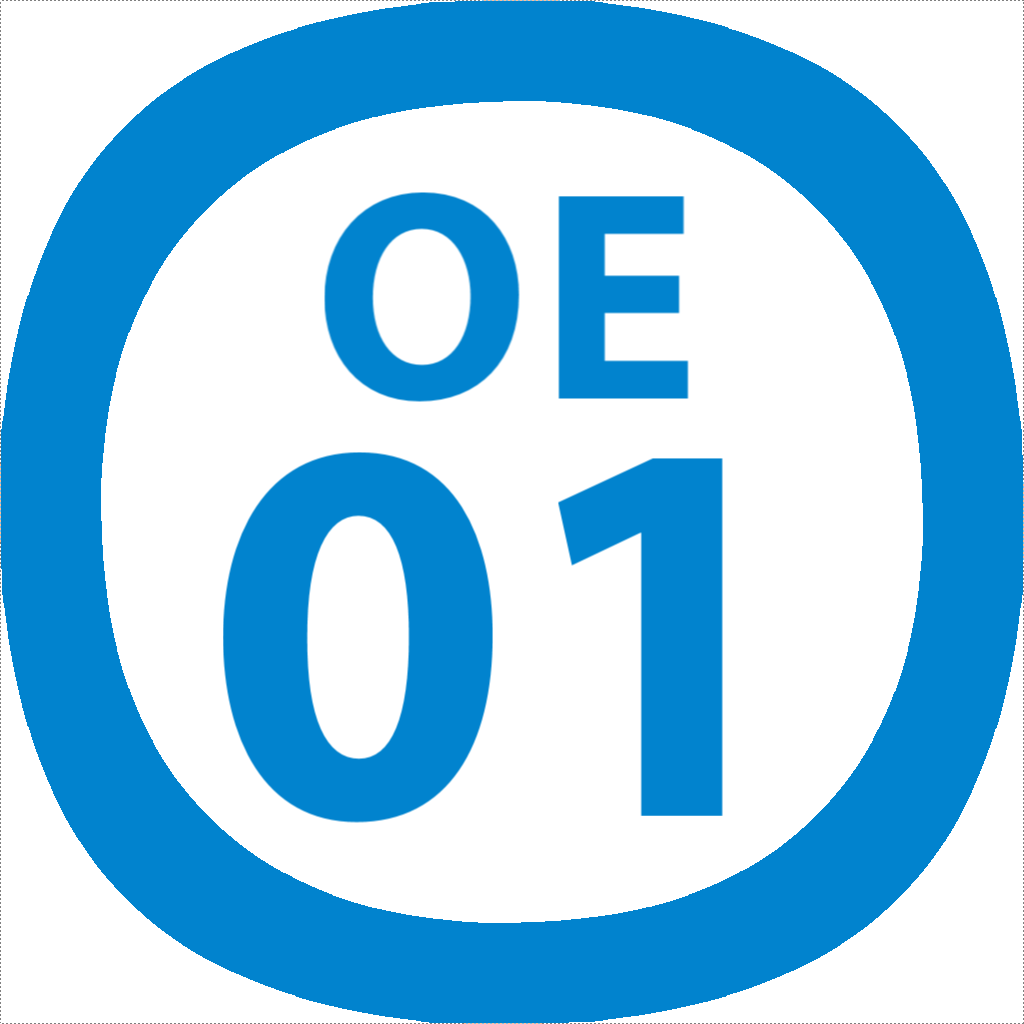
Higashi-Rikan Station 東林間駅

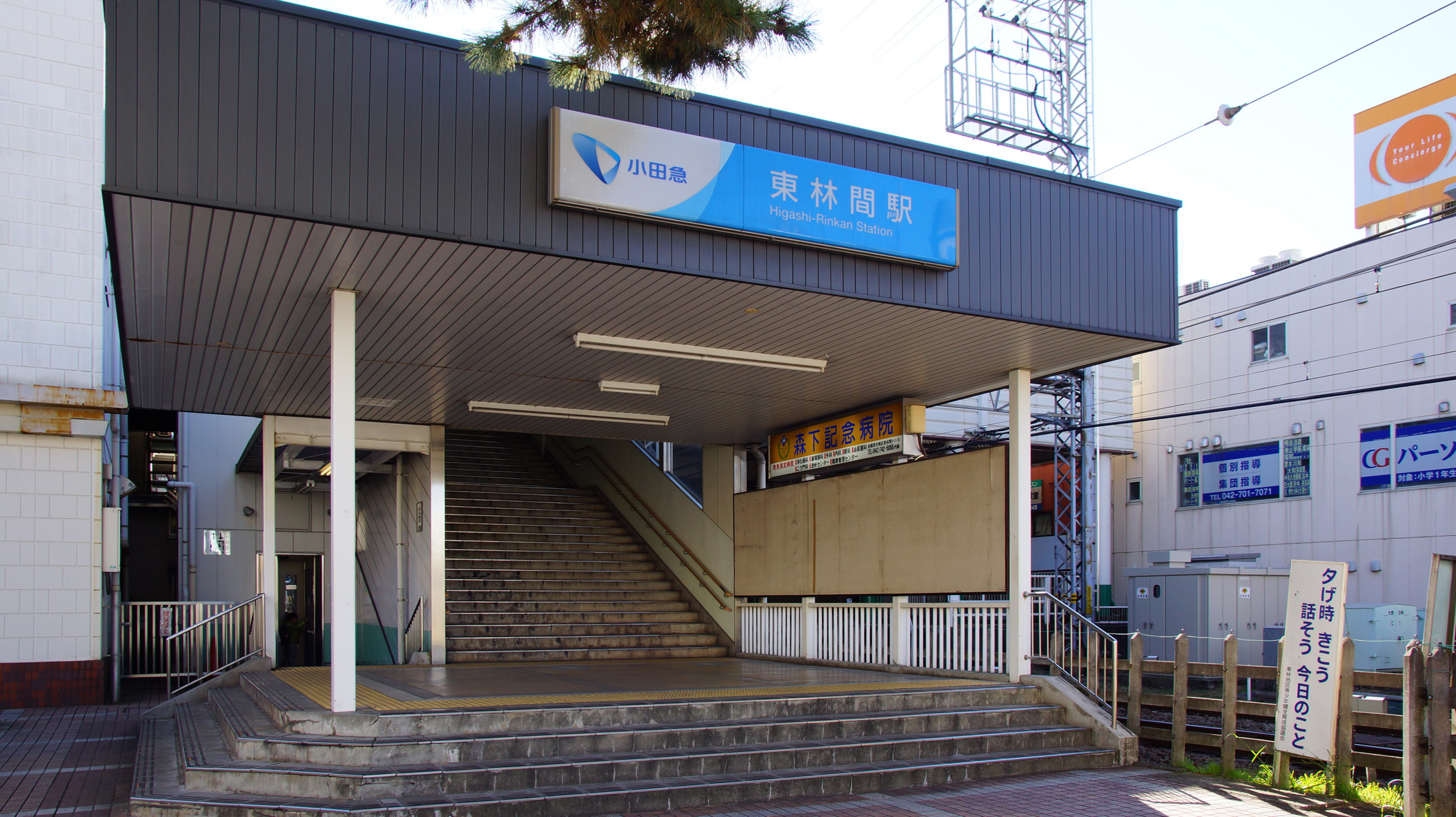
- The east entrance in December 2016

General information
- Location: 7-7-1 Kamitsuruma, Minami-ku, Sagamihara-shi, Kanagawa-ken 252-0302; Japan
- Coordinates: 35°31′13.87″N 139°26′20.01″E
- Operator: Odakyu Electric Railway
- Line: Odakyu Enoshima Line
- Distance: 33.8 km from Shinjuku
- Platforms: 2 side platforms
- Tracks: 2
- Connections: Bus stop

Other information
- Station code: OE-1
- Website: Official website

History
- Opened: April 1, 1929
- Rebuilt: 1982
- Former names: Higashi-Rikantoshi (until 1941)

Passengers
- FY2019: 22,006 daily

Services
Preceding station	Odakyu	Following station
Chūō-Rinkan towards Katase-Enoshima	Enoshima Line Local	Sagami-Ono towards Sagami-Ōno
Location
- Location within Kanagawa Prefecture Location within Japan

Higashi-Rinkan Station (東林間駅, Higashi-Rinkan-eki) is a passenger railway station located in the city of Sagamihara, Kanagawa, Japan and operated by the private railway operator Odakyu Electric Railway.

== Lines ==
Higashi-Rinkan Station is served by the Odakyu Enoshima Line, with some through services to and from Shinjuku in Tokyo. It lies 33.8 kilometers from Shinjuku.

== Station layout ==
The station consists of two opposed side platforms serving two tracks. The station building is elevated above the platforms and tracks.

=== Platforms ===
1	■ Odakyu Enoshima Line	for Fujisawa and Katase-Enoshima
2	■ Odakyu Enoshima Line	for Sagami-Ono and Shinjuku

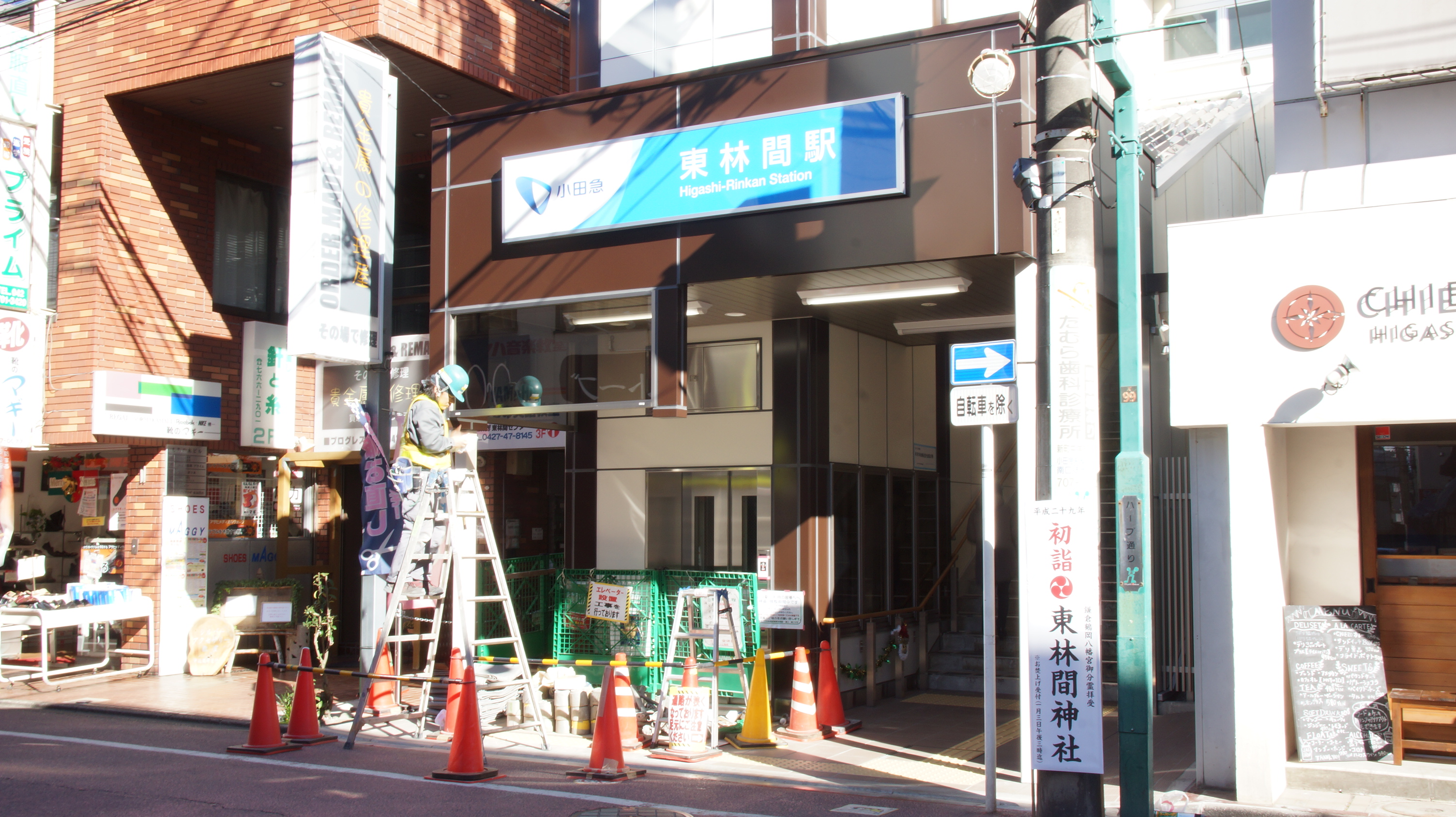
The west entrance in December 2016

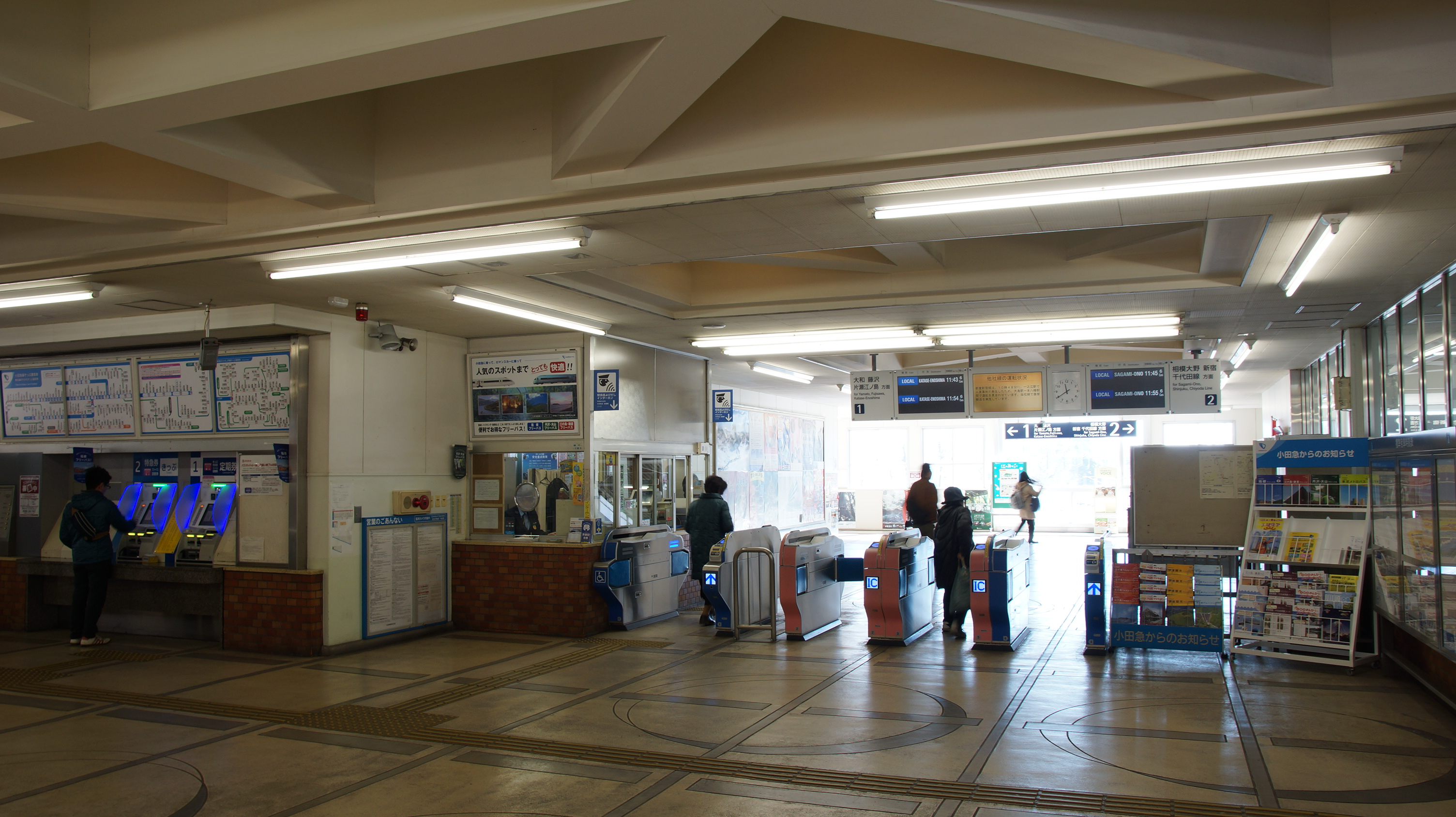
The ticket barriers in December 2016

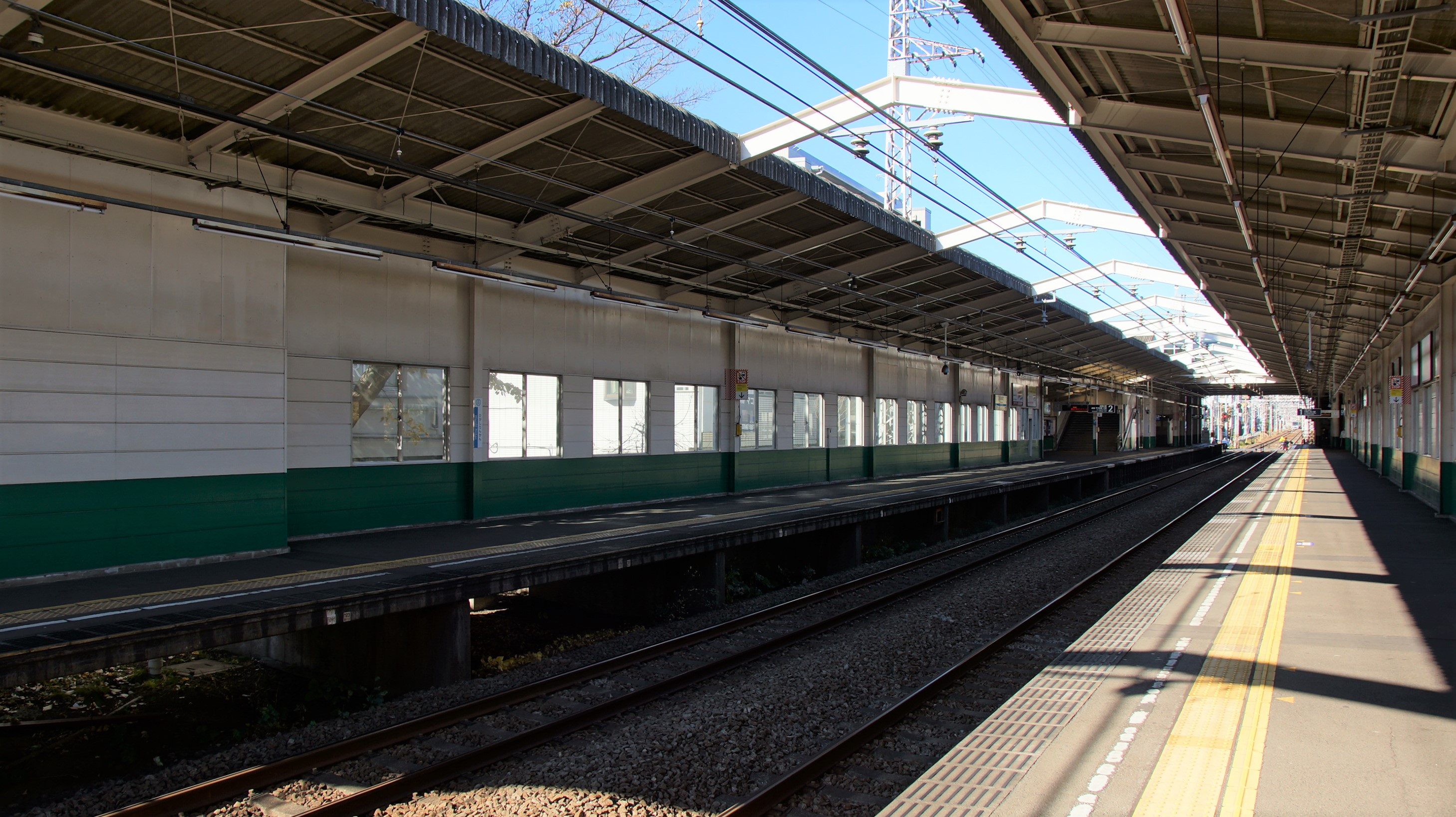
The south end of the platforms in December 2016

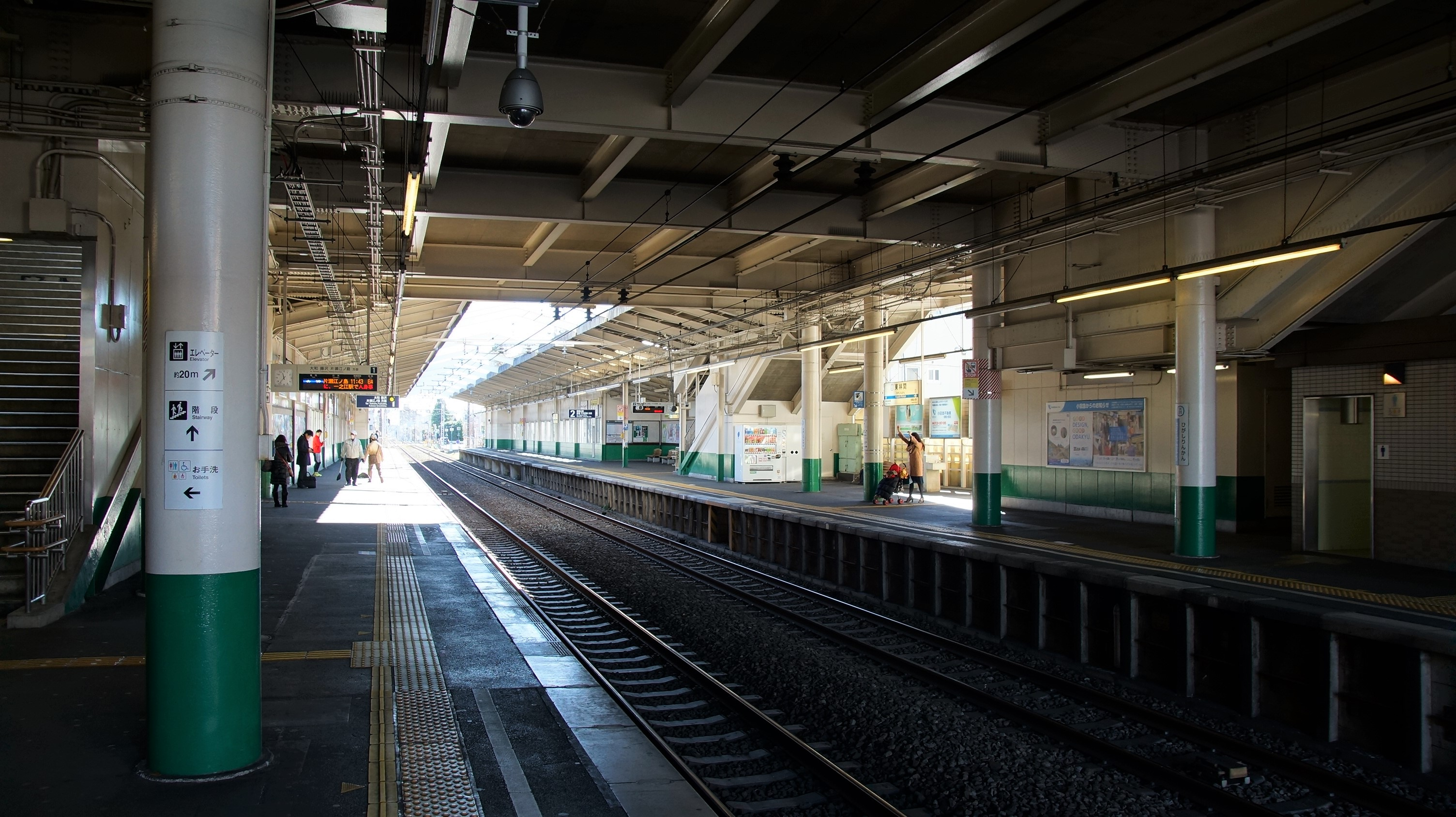
The north end of the platforms in December 2016

== History ==
The station opened on April 1, 1929, as Higashi-Rinkantoshi Station (東林間都市駅). Its name was shortened to Higashi-Rinkan on October 15, 1941.

== Passenger statistics ==
In fiscal 2019, the station was used by an average of 22,006 passengers daily.

The passenger figures for previous years are as shown below.

Fiscal year	daily average
2005	21,920
2010	21,422
2015	21,460

== Surrounding area ==
- Toshiba Rinkan Hospital
- Morishita Memorial Hospital

== See also ==
- List of railway stations in Japan
