= Kugenuma-Kaigan Station =

Railway station in Fujisawa, Kanagawa Prefecture, Japan

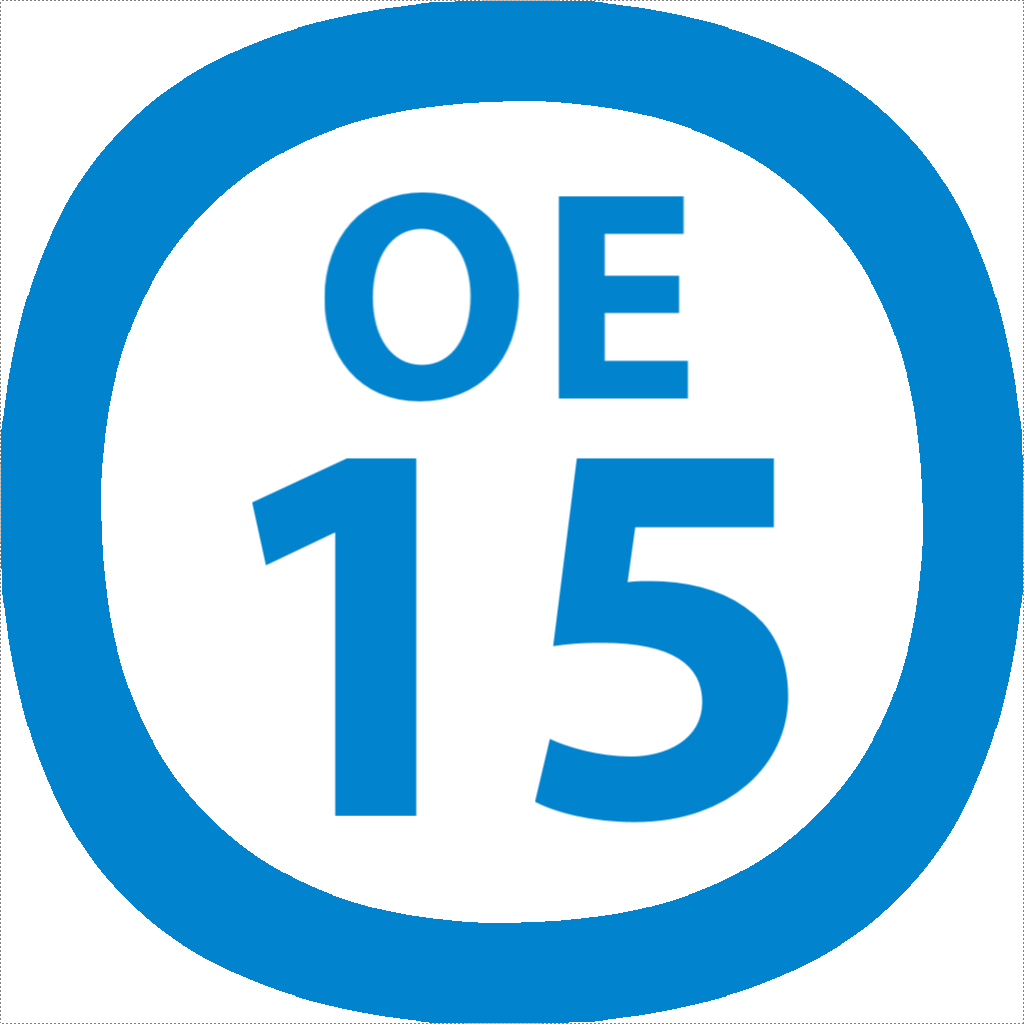
Kugenuma-Kaigan Station 鵠沼海岸駅

- Kugenuma-Kaigan Station, November 2026

General information
- Location: 2-4-10 Kugenuma-Kaigan, Fujisawa-shi, Kanagawa-ken 251-0037; Japan
- Coordinates: 35°19′14.85″N 139°28′16.06″E
- Operator: Odakyu Electric Railway
- Line: Odakyu Enoshima Line
- Distance: 58.2 km from Shinjuku
- Platforms: 2 side platforms
- Connections: Bus terminal

Other information
- Station code: OE-15
- Website: Official website

History
- Opened: April 1, 1929

Passengers
- FY2019: 19,859 daily

Services
Preceding station	Odakyu	Following station
Katase-Enoshima Terminus	Enoshima Line Local	Hon-Kugenuma towards Sagami-Ōno
Location
- Location within Kanagawa Prefecture Location within Japan

Kugenuma-Kaigan Station (鵠沼海岸駅, Kugenuma-Kaigan-eki) is a passenger railway station located in the city of Fujisawa, Kanagawa, Japan and operated by the private railway operator Odakyu Electric Railway.

== Lines ==
Kugenuma-Kaigan Station is served by the Odakyu Enoshima Line, with some through services to and from Shinjuku in Tokyo. It lies 58.2 kilometres (36.2 mi) from the Shinjuku terminus.

== Station layout ==
The station consists of two side platforms serving two tracks, which are connected to the station building by a footbridge.

=== Platforms ===
1	■ Odakyu Enoshima Line	for Katase-Enoshima
2	■ Odakyu Enoshima Line	for Sagami-Ōno and Shinjuku

Platforms

== History ==
Kugenuma-Kaigan Station was opened on April 1, 1929. The platforms were lengthened to accept 10-car express trains in 1998.

== Passenger statistics ==
In fiscal 2019, the station was used by an average of 19,859 passengers daily.

The passenger figures for previous years are as shown below.

Fiscal year	daily average
2005	19,184
2010	19,765
2015	19,696

== Surrounding area ==
- Kugenuma Beach
- Prefectural Shonan Kaigan Park
- Fujisawa City Kugenuma Public Hall / Kugenuma Civic Center
- Kugenumakaigan Post Office
- Kugenuma Sports Park (Happe Park)

== See also ==
- List of railway stations in Japan
