= Odakyū Enoshima Line =

Railway line in Japan

Enoshima Line

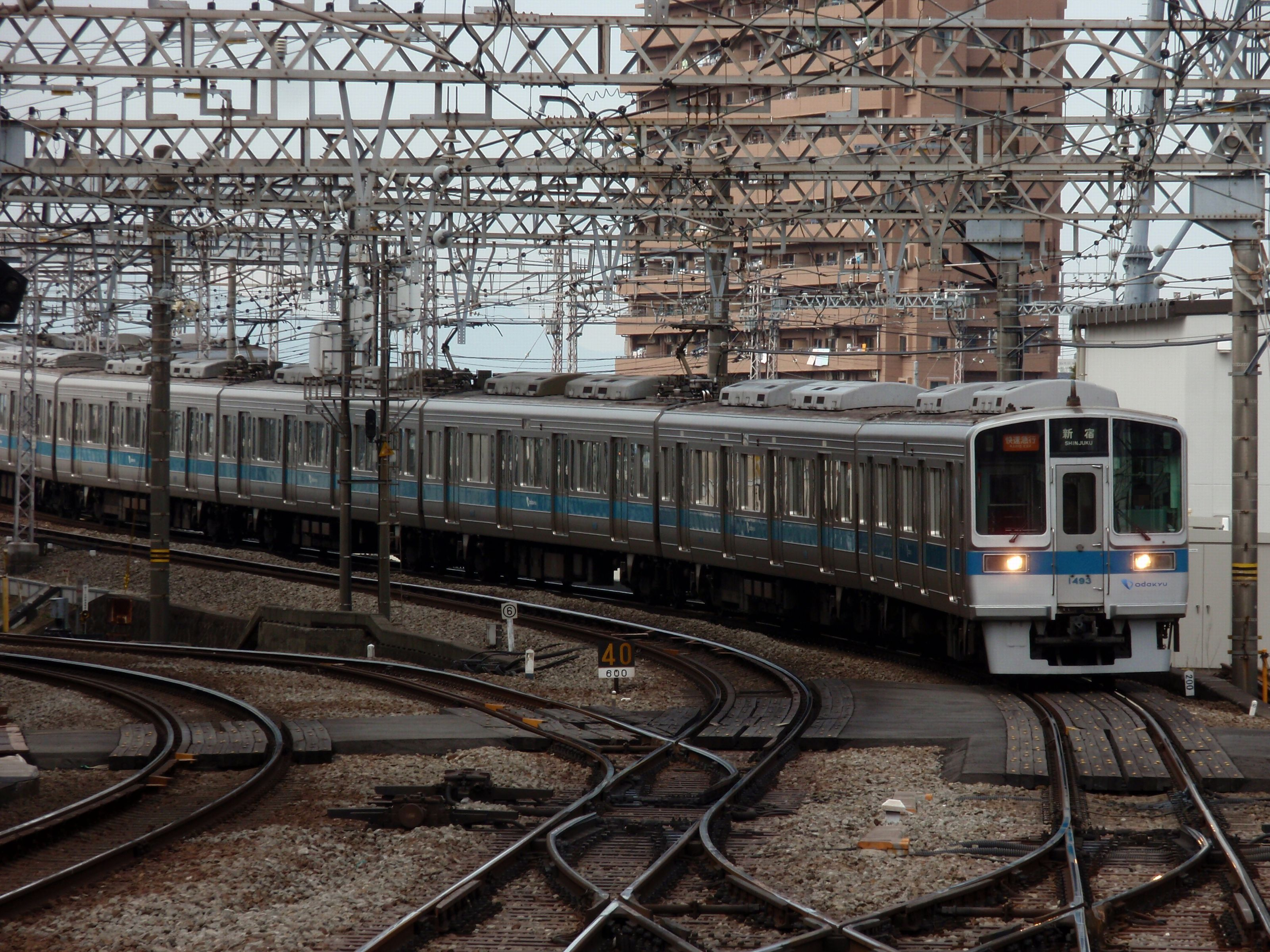
- An Odakyu 1000 series EMU on the Enoshima Line in February 2012

Overview
- Native name: 江ノ島線
- Status: In service
- Owner: Odakyū Electric Railway Company, Ltd.
- Line number: OE
- Locale: Kanto region
- Termini: Sagami-Ōno; Katase-Enoshima
- Stations: 17

Service
- Type: Commuter rail
- System: Odakyu Electric Railway
- Operator(s): Odakyū Electric Railway Company, Ltd.

History
- Opened: 1 April 1929; 97 years ago

Technical
- Line length: 27.6 km (17.1 mi)
- Number of tracks: 2
- Track gauge: 1,067 mm (3 ft 6 in)
- Electrification: Overhead line, 1,500 V DC
- Operating speed: 110 km/h (68 mph)
- Train protection system: D-ATS-P

The Enoshima Line (江ノ島線, Enoshima-sen) is a branch line operated by the Japanese private railway operator Odakyū Electric Railway in eastern Kanagawa Prefecture. The Enoshima Line branches from the Odawara Line at Sagami-Ōno, extending south to Fujisawa and Katase-Enoshima, a distance of 27.6 km. It was completed with 13 stations on April 1, 1929.

As is the case with the Odawara Line, the operator offers limited express services to the popular scenic site of Enoshima for a surcharge. After the introduction of East Japan Railway Company's (JR East) Shōnan-Shinjuku Line, passengers between Fujisawa Station and Shinjuku Station have had an alternative to the Enoshima Line. Odakyū have responded since then to improve the frequencies of rapid through services to Shinjuku.

== History ==
The Odawara Express Railway Co. opened the Sagami-Ōno - Fujisawa section in 1928, and extended the line to Katase-Enoshima, as well as duplicating the entire line, the following year. In 1943 the line was returned to single track and the steel rail recycled for the Japanese war effort. The line was re-duplicated in 1948/49.

In 1942, the company was forcibly merged by the government with Tokyu Corporation. Tokyu was broken up in 1948 and the line was transferred to the newly founded Odakyu Electric Railway Co.

Freight services operated on the line between 1944 and 1966.

== Services ==
The Limited Express trains are named Enoshima and Homeway. Surcharges are required for rapid and seat reservation services with better accommodation of carriages. Rapid service is also offered. Express and Rapid Express services make more stops than Limited Express services, and are served by the same types of EMUs as Local trains without extra charge.

Romancecar (ロマンスカー, Romansukā)
Limited Express service between Katase-Enoshima and Shinjuku (known as the "Enoshima") or Kita-senju via the Tokyo Metro Chiyoda Line (known as the "Metro Enoshima").
Rapid Express (快速急行, Kaisoku Kyūkō)
Service between Shinjuku and Fujisawa (only two are to/from Katase-Enoshima)
Express (急行, Kyūkō)
Service between Shinjuku and Katase-Enoshima
Local (各駅停車, Kakueki Teisha)
Service between Shinjuku, Machida or Sagami-Ōno and Katase-Enoshima

== Stations ==
All stations are located in Kanagawa Prefecture. Local trains stop at all stations

Legend

- ● : All trains stop
- | : All trains pass

No.	Name	Distance in km (mi)			Romancecar	Rapid Express	Express	Transfers	Location
No.	Name	Between stations	From Sagami-Ōno	From Shinjuku	Romancecar	Rapid Express	Express	Transfers	Location
OH28	Sagami-Ōno 相模大野	—N/a	0 (0)	32.2 (20.0)	●	●	●	Odawara Line (OH28; through service)	Minami, Sagamihara
OE01	Higashi-Rinkan 東林間	1.5 (0.93)	1.5 (0.93)	33.8 (21.0)	|	|	|		Minami, Sagamihara
OE02	Chūō-Rinkan 中央林間	1.5 (0.93)	3.0 (1.9)	35.3 (21.9)	|	●	●	Den-en-toshi Line (DT27)	Yamato
OE03	Minami-Rinkan 南林間	1.5 (0.93)	4.5 (2.8)	36.8 (22.9)	|	|	●		Yamato
OE04	Tsuruma 鶴間	0.6 (0.37)	5.1 (3.2)	37.4 (23.2)	|	|	|		Yamato
OE05	Yamato 大和	2.5 (1.6)	7.6 (4.7)	39.9 (24.8)	●	●	●	Sōtetsu Main Line (SO14)	Yamato
OE06	Sakuragaoka 桜ヶ丘	2.2 (1.4)	9.8 (6.1)	42.1 (26.2)	|	|	|		Yamato
OE07	Kōza-Shibuya 高座渋谷	2.0 (1.2)	11.8 (7.3)	44.1 (27.4)	|	|	|		Yamato
OE08	Chōgo 長後	2.2 (1.4)	14.0 (8.7)	46.3 (28.8)	|	|	●		Fujisawa
OE09	Shōnandai 湘南台	1.8 (1.1)	15.8 (9.8)	48.1 (29.9)	|	●	●	Sōtetsu Izumino Line (SO37); Blue Line (B01)	Fujisawa
OE10	Mutsuai-Nichidaimae 六会日大前	1.5 (0.93)	17.3 (10.7)	49.6 (30.8)	|	|	|		Fujisawa
OE11	Zengyō 善行	2.4 (1.5)	19.7 (12.2)	52.0 (32.3)	|	|	|		Fujisawa
OE12	Fujisawa-Hommachi 藤沢本町	1.6 (0.99)	21.3 (13.2)	53.6 (33.3)	|	|	|		Fujisawa
OE13	Fujisawa 藤沢	1.8 (1.1)	23.1 (14.4)	55.4 (34.4)	●	●	●	Tōkaidō Line (JT08); Enoden (EN01)	Fujisawa
OE14	Hon-Kugenuma 本鵠沼	1.5 (0.93)	24.6 (15.3)	56.9 (35.4)	|		|		Fujisawa
OE15	Kugenuma-Kaigan 鵠沼海岸	1.3 (0.81)	25.9 (16.1)	58.2 (36.2)	|		|		Fujisawa
OE16	Katase-Enoshima 片瀬江ノ島	1.7 (1.1)	27.6 (17.1)	59.9 (37.2)	●		●	Enoden (Enoshima: EN06); Shonan Monorail (Shōnan-Enoshima: SMR8)	Fujisawa
