= Fujisawa Station =

Railway station in Fujisawa, Kanagawa Prefecture, Japan

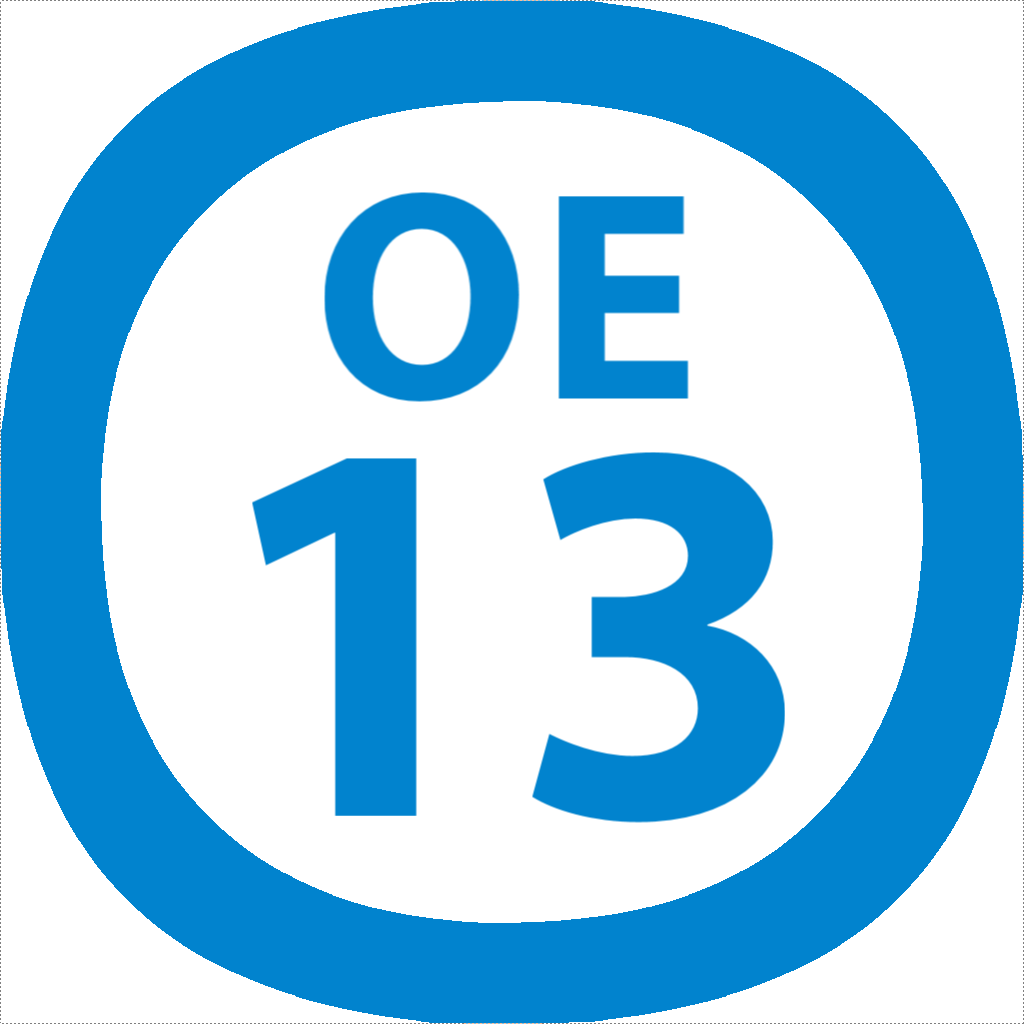
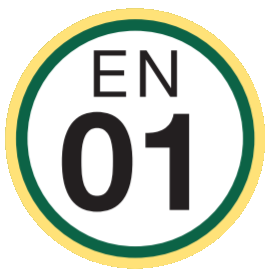
JT08 Fujisawa Station 藤沢駅

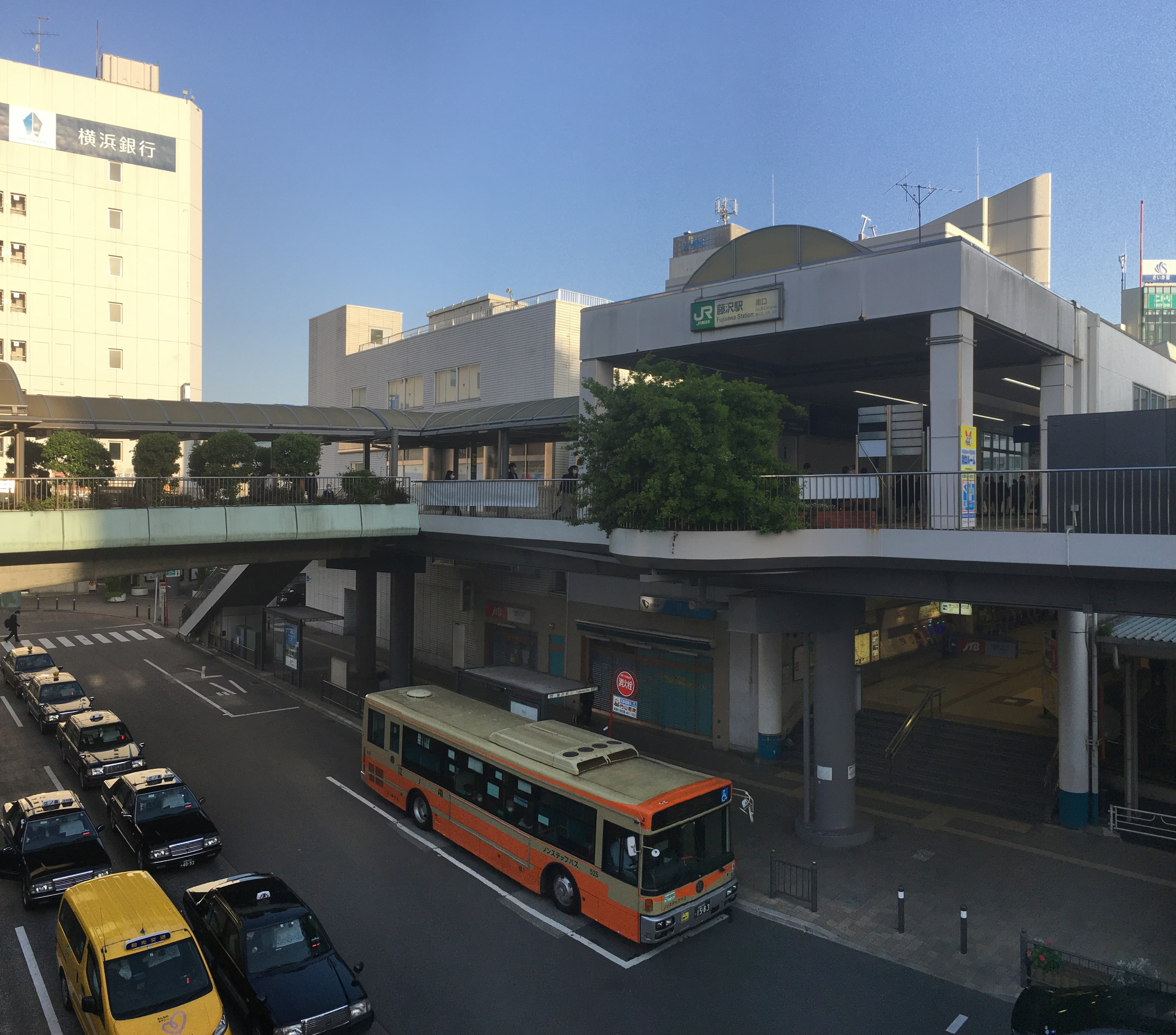
- South entrance of Fujisawa Station, 2021

Japanese name
- Shinjitai: 藤沢駅
- Kyūjitai: 藤澤驛
- Hiragana: ふじさわえき

General information
- Location: 1 Minamifujisawa, Fujisawa City, Kanagawa Prefecture 251-0055; Japan
- Coordinates: 35°20′14″N 139°29′14″E
- Operator: JR East; Odakyu Electric Railway; Enoshima Electric Railway
- Lines: Tōkaidō Line; Odakyu Enoshima Line; Enoshima Electric Railway Line
- Distance: 51.1 km (31.8 mi) from Tokyo
- Connections: Bus terminal

Other information
- Status: Staffed (Midori no Madoguchi)

History
- Opened: 11 July 1887; 139 years ago

Passengers
- FY2019: 108,873 (JR East, boarding); 165,663 (Odakyu, daily); 22,968 (Enoden, daily)

Services
| Preceding station | JR East | Following station |
|---|---|---|
| Tsujidō JT09 towards Odawara | Shōnan | Ōfuna towards Tokyo |
| Tsujidō JT09 towards Atami | Tōkaidō Line | Ōfuna towards Tokyo |
| Chigasaki JT10 towards Odawara | Shōnan | Osaki towards Shinjuku |
| Chigasaki JT10 towards Odawara | Shōnan–Shinjuku Line Special Rapid | Ōfuna towards Maebashi |
| Tsujidō JT09 towards Odawara | Shōnan–Shinjuku Line Rapid | Ōfuna towards Maebashi |
| Preceding station | Odakyu | Following station |
| Katase-Enoshima Terminus | Romancecar | Yamato towards Shinjuku or Kita-Senju |
| Terminus | Enoshima Line Rapid Express | Shōnandai towards Sagami-Ōno |
| Katase-Enoshima Terminus | Enoshima Line Express | Shōnandai towards Sagami-Ōno |
| Hon-Kugenuma towards Katase-Enoshima | Enoshima Line Local | Fujisawa-Hommachi towards Sagami-Ōno |
| Preceding station | Enoshima Electric Railway | Following station |
| Terminus | Enoden | Ishigami towards Kamakura |
Location
- Location within Kanagawa Prefecture Location within Kanto Area Location within Japan

Fujisawa Station (藤沢駅, Fujisawa-eki) is an interchange passenger railway station located in the city of Fujisawa, Kanagawa, Japan, operated by East Japan Railway Company (JR East) and the private railway operators Odakyu Electric Railway and Enoshima Electric Railway. Clustered around the station are large department stores and office buildings, forming the center of the city.

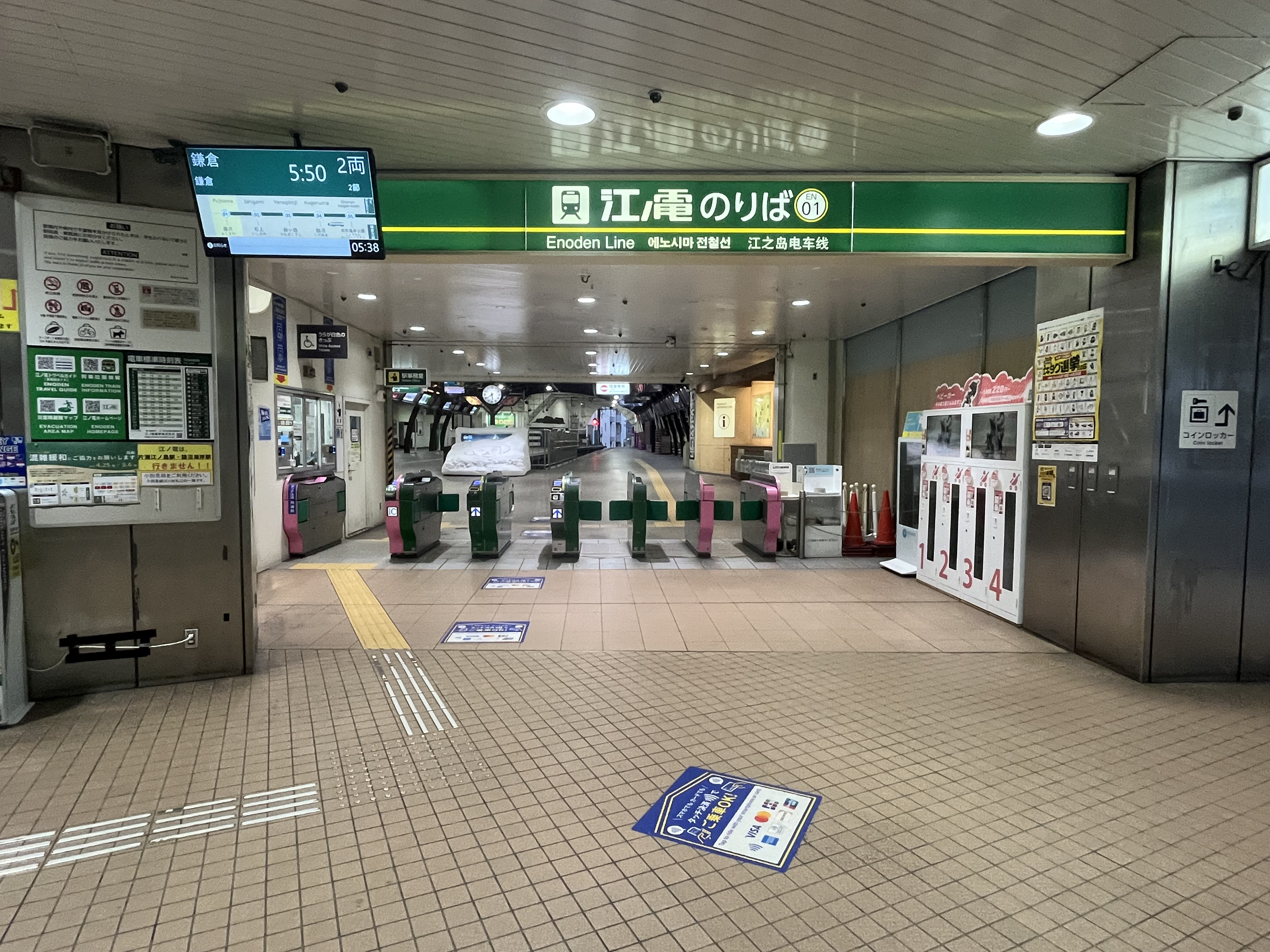
Enoshima Electric Railway ticket gate

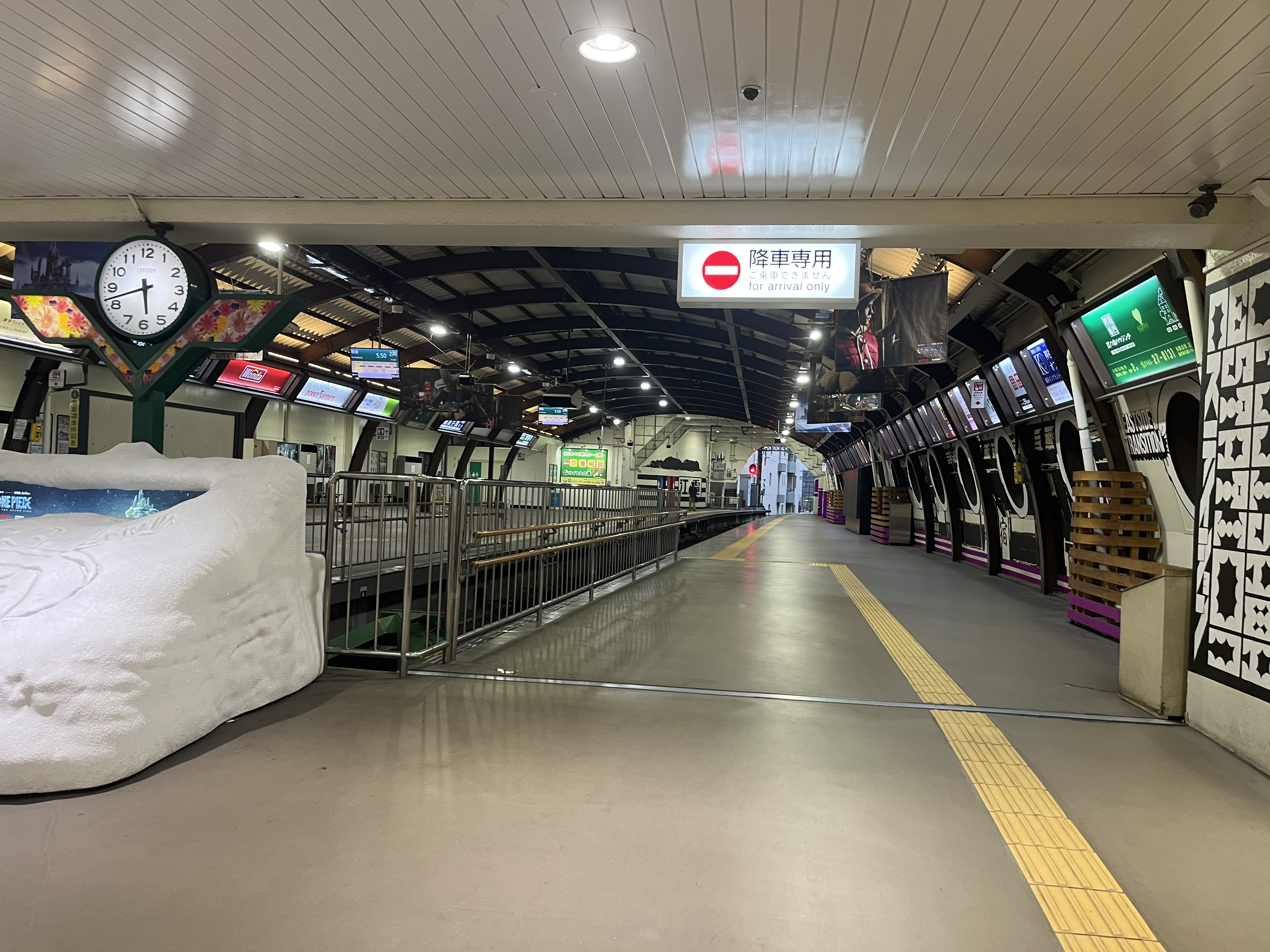
Enoshima Electric Railway Platform

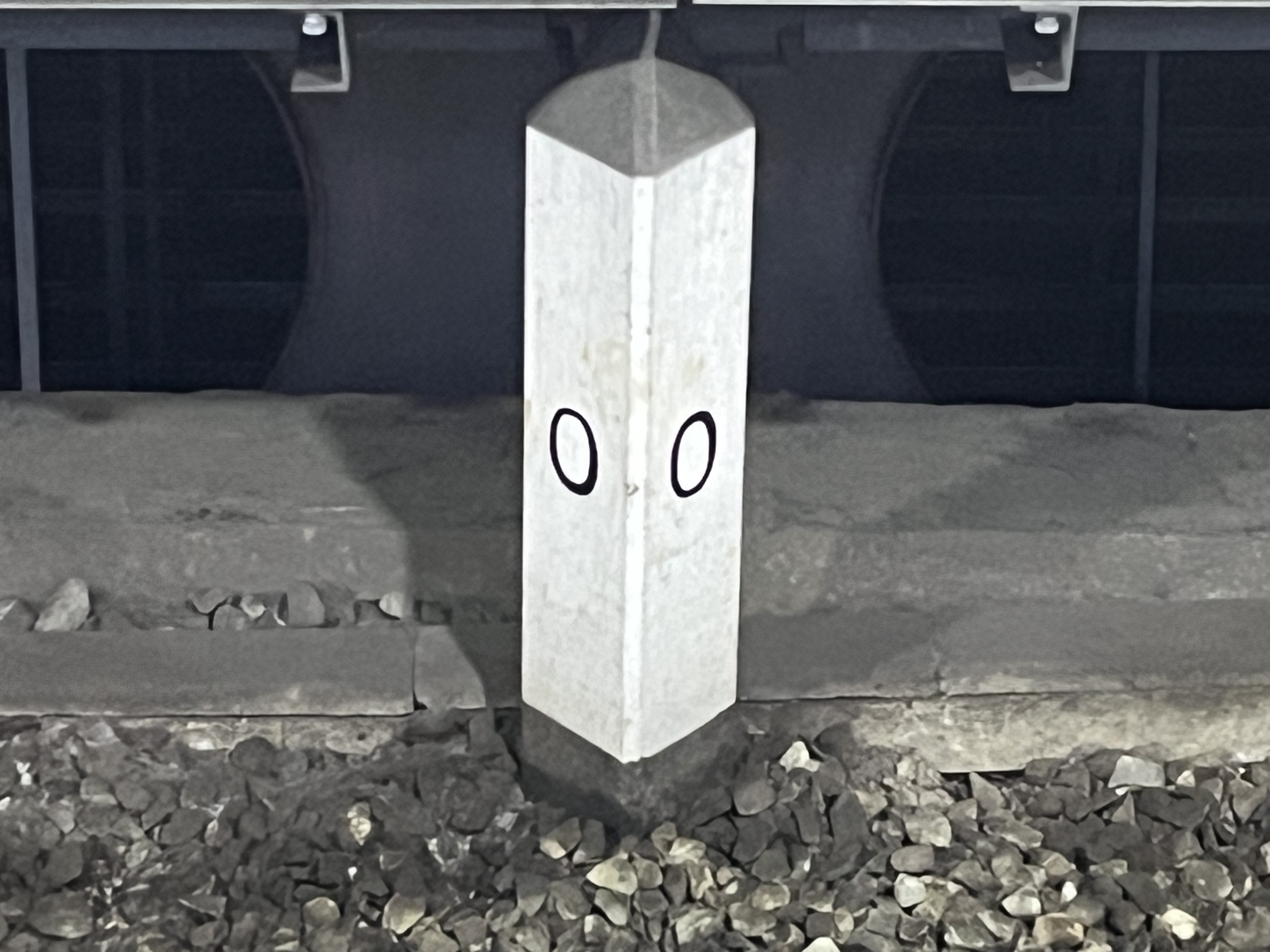
Enoshima Electric Railway's 0 km post

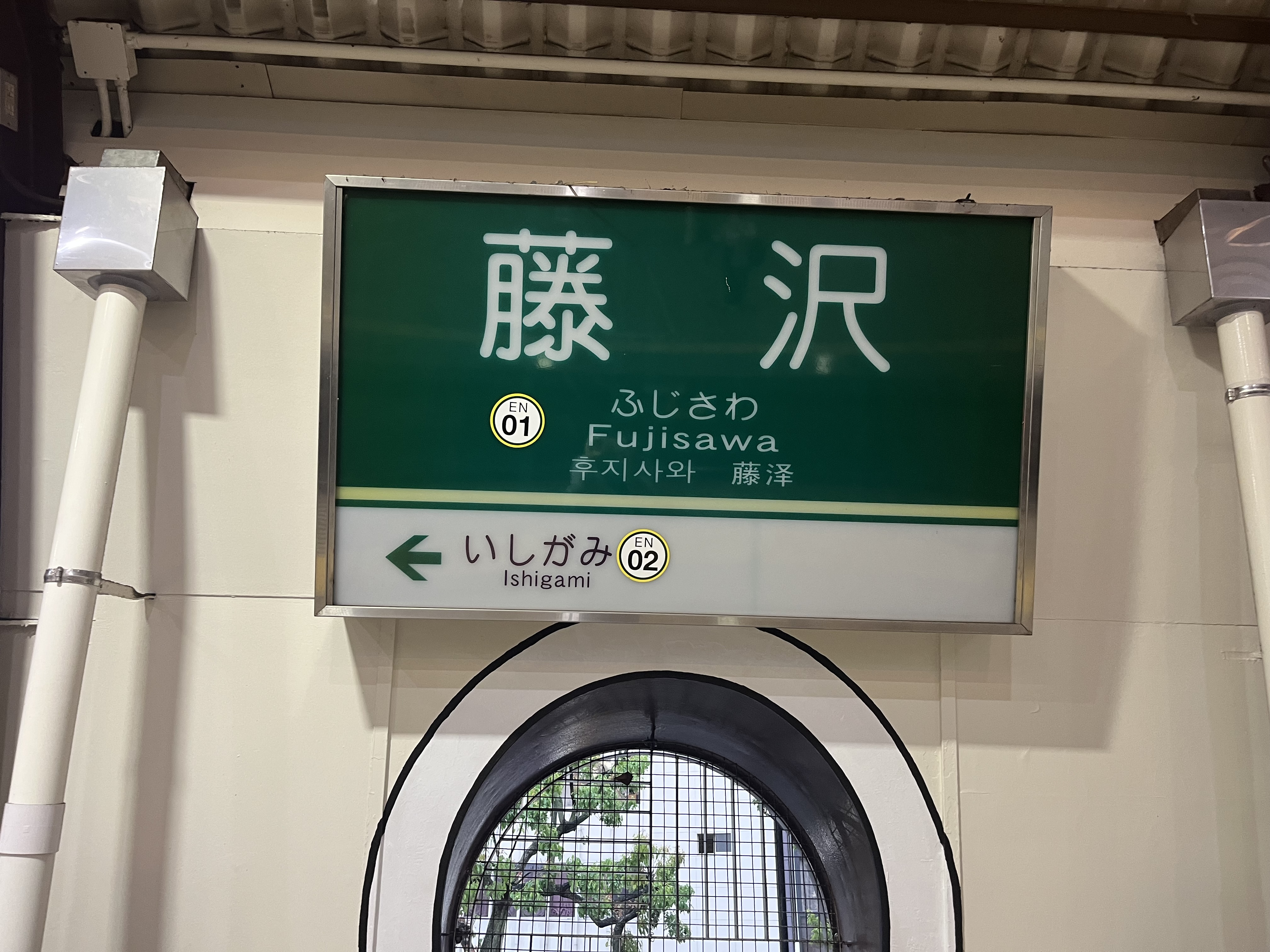
Enoshima Electric Railway station name sign

== Lines ==
This station is served by the JR East Tōkaidō Main Line with, with some through services via the Shōnan-Shinjuku Line, the Odakyu Enoshima Line, and the Enoshima Electric Railway. The station lies 51.1 km (31.8 mi) from the official starting point of the Tōkaidō Main Line at Tokyo Station.

== Station layout ==
=== JR East ===
JR East uses two island platforms connected by a footbridge to the main station building. Platforms 1 and 2 are used by Shōnan services. The station has a Midori no Madoguchi staffed ticket office.

| 1 | ■ Tōkaidō Line (Shōnan) | for Shinagawa and Tokyo for Shinjuku |
| 2 | ■ Tōkaidō Line (Shōnan) | for Chigasaki, Hiratsuka and Odawara |
| 3 | Tōkaidō Line (Ueno-Tokyo Line) | for Yokohama, Tokyo, Ueno, Ōmiya; Utsunomiya Line for Utsunomiya and Kuroiso; Takasaki Line for Takasaki and Maebashi |
| 3 | Shōnan-Shinjuku Line | for Yokohama, Shibuya, Shinjuku, Ikebukuro, Ōmiya, Takasaki and Maebashi (via Takasaki Line) |
| 4 | Tōkaidō Line | for Hiratsuka, Kōzu, Odawara, Atami, Numazu; Itō Line for Itō |

=== Odakyu ===
The Odakyu line uses a double bay platform. Trains arrive and depart from the west end of the platform and go through crossover points to the northbound and southbound tracks.

| 1 | Odakyu Enoshima Line | for Katase-Enoshima / Yamato, Sagami-Ōno, Machida, and Shinjuku (10-car trains) |
| 2 | Odakyu Enoshima Line | for Katase-Enoshima / Yamato, Sagami-Ōno, Machida, and Shinjuku (limited express trains) |
| 3/4 | Odakyu Enoshima Line | for Yamato, Sagami-Ōno, Machida, and Shinjuku |

=== Enoshima Electric Railway ===
The Enoden station uses a single bay platform. Its automated turnstiles are compatible with Suica and Pasmo systems.

| 1 | Enoshima Electric Railway | for Kamakura |
| 1 | Enoshima Electric Railway | Alighting passengers only |

== History ==
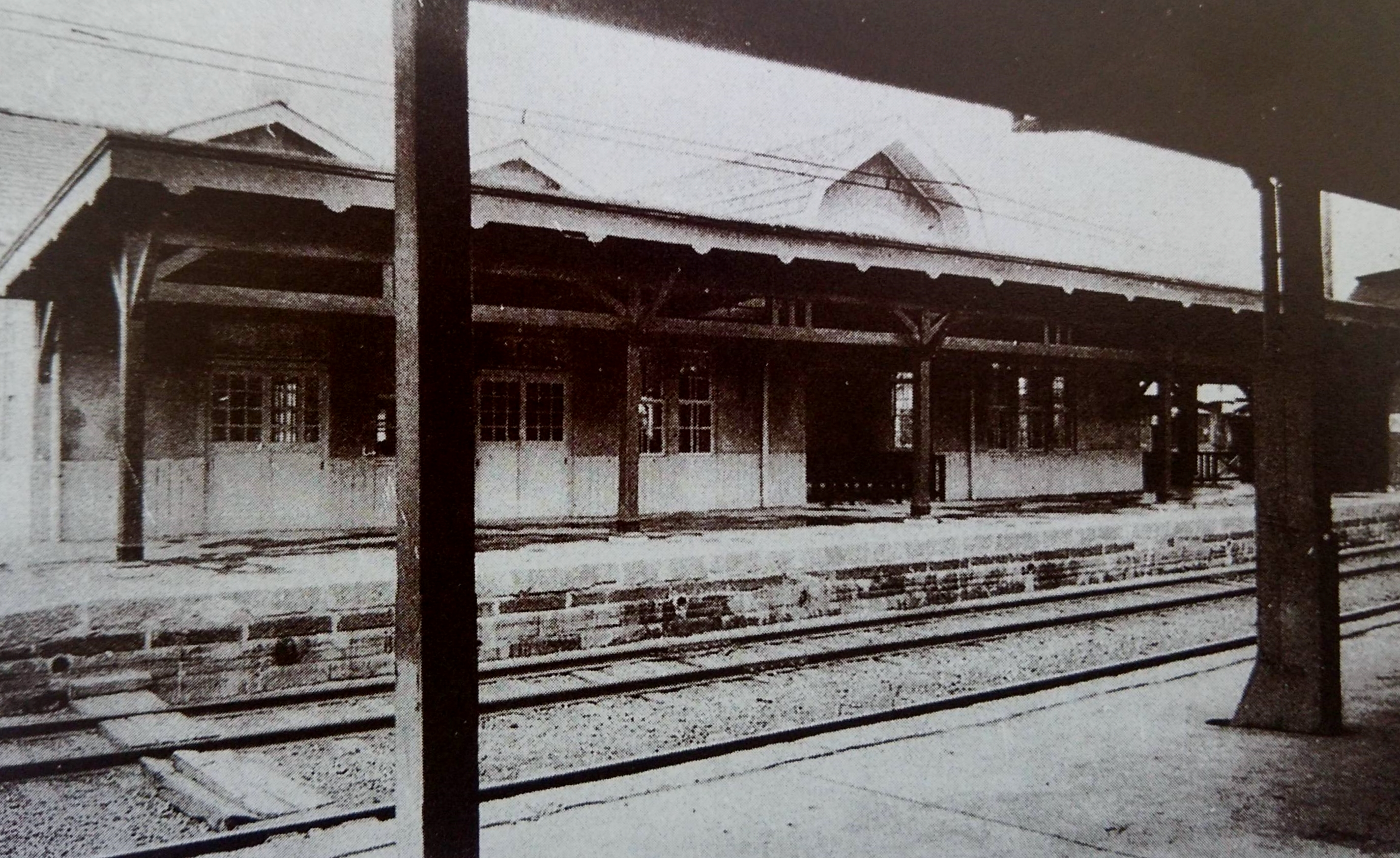
The station in 1924

What is now the JR East station opened on 11 July 1887. The adjacent Enoshima Electric Railway station opened on 1 September 1902, and the Odakyu station opened on 1 April 1929. With the dissolution and privatization of JNR on 1 April 1987, the station came under the operational control of JR East.

Station numbering was introduced to the Odakyu-owned stations January 2014 with Fujisawa being assigned station numbers OH13 for the Enoshima line and EN01 for the Enoshima Electric Railway.

== Passenger statistics ==
In fiscal 2019, the JR East portion of the station was used by an average of 108,873 passengers daily (boarding passengers only). During the same period, the Odakyu portion of the station was used by an average of 165,663 passengers daily, and the Enoden portion of the station was used by 22,968 passengers daily.

The passenger figures for previous years are as shown below.

| Fiscal year | JR East (boarding) | Odakyu (total) | Enoden (total) |
|---|---|---|---|
| 2005 | 95,436 | 142,109 | 19,658 |
| 2010 | 102,284 | 154,045 | 26,001 |
| 2015 | 107,447 | 162,345 | 22,165 |

== Bus terminal ==
=== Highway buses ===
- Airport Limousine; For Narita International Airport
- Airport Limousine; For Haneda Airport
- For Fuji-Q Highland and Kawaguchiko Station
- Lake & Port; For Sannai, Sennan, Rokugō, Ōmagari Station, Nakasen, Kakunodate Station, and Tazawako Station
- For Fukui Station, Komatsu, and Kanazawa Station
- Southern Cross; For Kyōto Station, Kyōtanabe, Ōsaka Station, Osaka City Air Terminal, Namba Station, Sakai Station, Sakaihigashi Station, and Sakaishi Station

== See also ==
- List of railway stations in Japan
