= Sagami-Ōno Station =

Railway station in Sagamihara, Kanagawa Prefecture, Japan

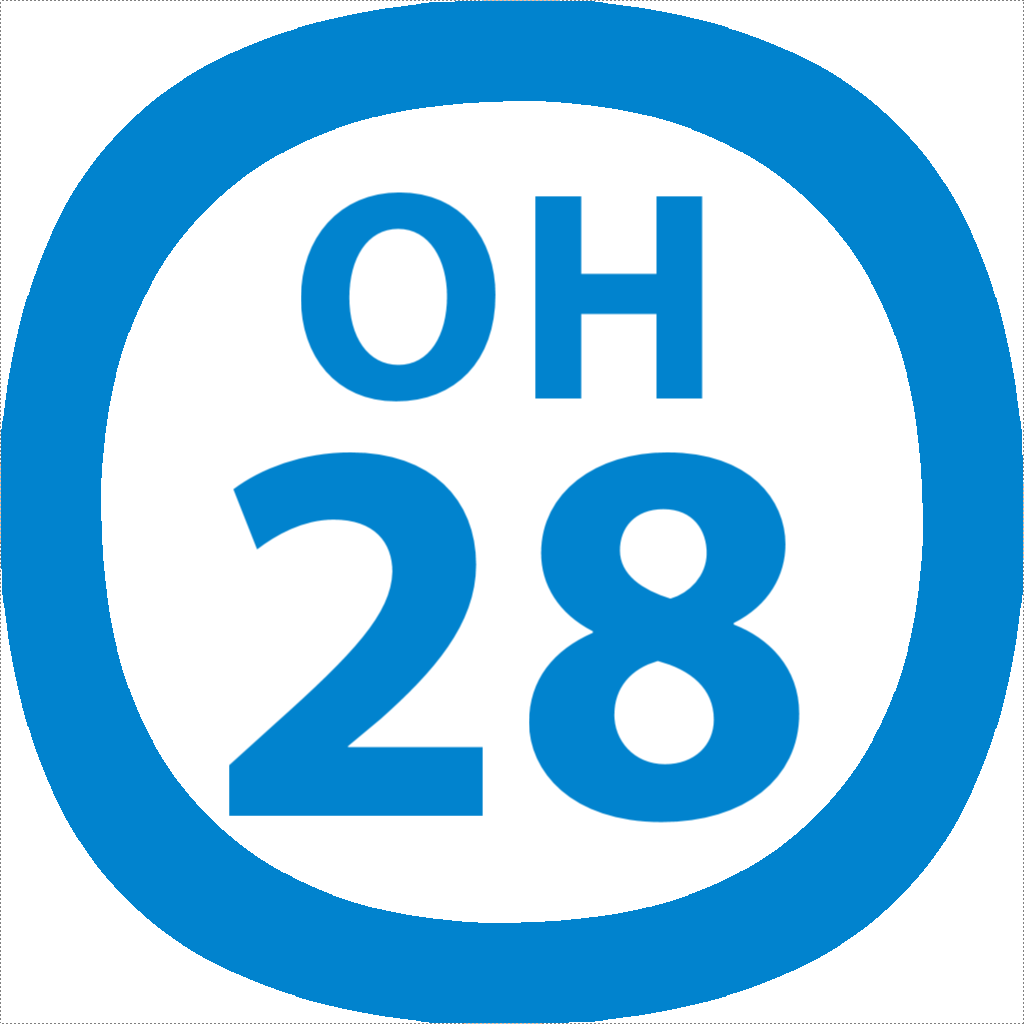
Sagami-Ōno Station 相模大野駅

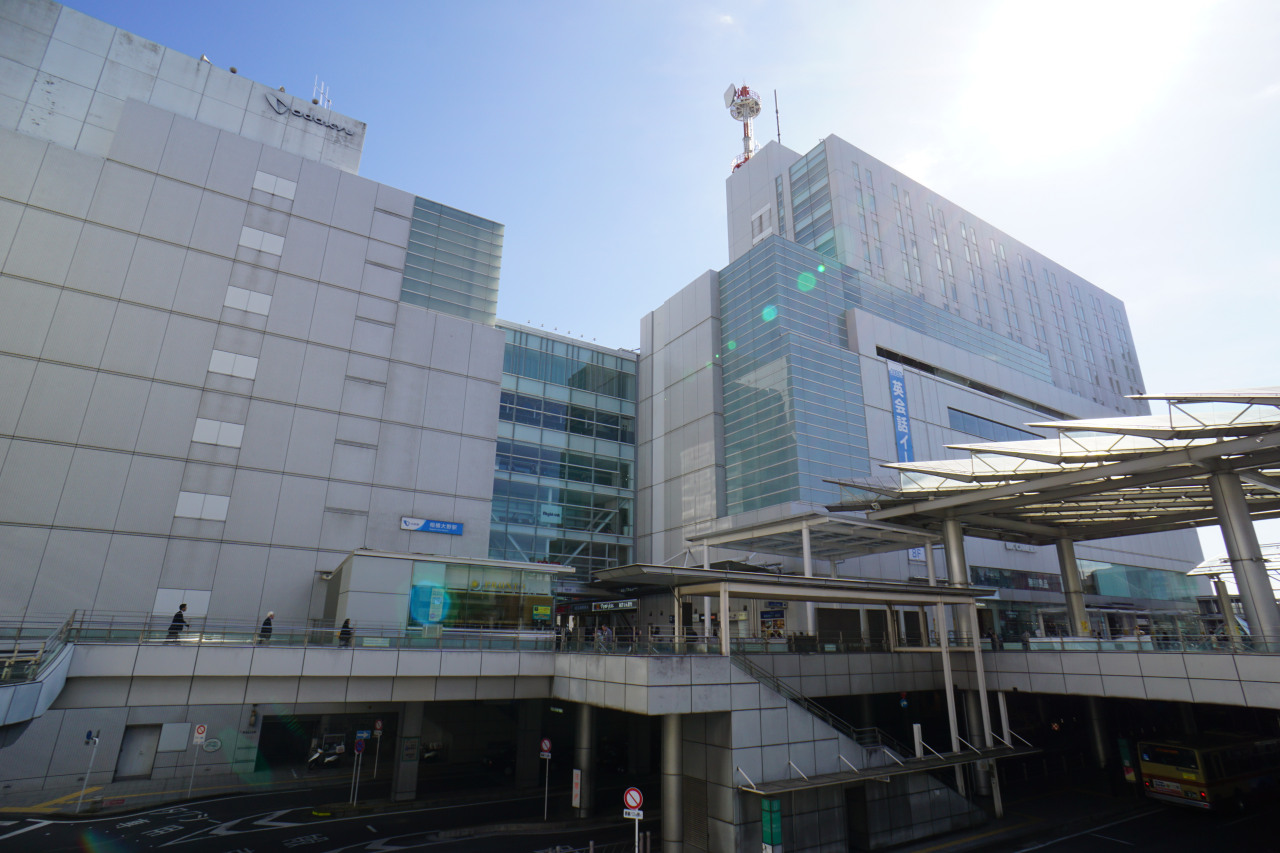
- The north side of Sagami-Ōno Station in October 2016

General information
- Location: 3-8-1 Sagami-Ōno, Minami, Sagamihara, Kanagawa; Japan
- Coordinates: 35°31′56″N 139°26′16″E
- Operator: Odakyu Electric Railway
- Distance: 32.4 km (20.1 mi) from Shinjuku
- Platforms: 2 island platforms
- Tracks: 6
- Connections: Bus terminal

Other information
- Station code: OH28
- Website: Official website

History
- Opened: 1 April 1938; 88 years ago
- Former names: Tsūshin-Gakkō (until 1941)

Passengers
- FY2019: 127,169 daily

Services
Preceding station	Odakyu	Following station
Ebina towards Hakone-Yumoto or Gotemba	Romancecar	Machida towards Shinjuku or Kita-Senju
Yamato towards Katase-Enoshima	Romancecar	Machida towards Shinjuku or Kita-Senju
Ebina towards Odawara	Odawara Line Rapid Express	Machida towards Shinjuku
Ebina towards Odawara	Odawara Line Express	Machida towards Shinjuku or Yoyogi-Uehara
Odakyu Sagamihara One-way operation	Odawara Line Commuter Semi Express	Machida towards Yoyogi-Uehara
Odakyu Sagamihara towards Hon-Atsugi	Odawara Line Semi Express	Machida towards Yoyogi-Uehara
Odakyu Sagamihara towards Odawara	Odawara Line Local	Machida towards Shinjuku or Yoyogi-Uehara
Chūō-Rinkan towards Fujisawa	Enoshima Line Rapid Express	through to Odawara Line
Chūō-Rinkan towards Katase-Enoshima	Enoshima Line Express	through to Odawara Line
Higashi-Rinkan towards Katase-Enoshima	Enoshima Line Local	through to Odawara Line
Location
- Location within Kanagawa Prefecture Location within Japan

Sagami-Ōno Station (Japanese: 相模大野駅, Hepburn: Sagami-Ōno-eki) is a junction passenger railway station located in the city of Sagamihara, Kanagawa Prefecture, Japan, operated by the private railway operator Odakyu Electric Railway.

== Lines ==
Sagami-Ono Station is served by both the Odakyu Odawara Line and the Odakyu Enoshima Line. It is 32.4 km (20.1 mi) from the Tokyo terminus of the Odawara Line at Shinjuku, and is also the northern terminus of the 26.6 km (16.5 mi) Enoshima Line to Katase-Enoshima.

== Station layout ==
The station consists of two island platforms with six tracks, connected to the station building by footbridges. The two central tracks are used for non-stop train services. The station building is part of a large shopping mall, containing an Odakyu OX supermarket, Odakyu department store, a Bic Camera discount electronics store, and the Odakyu Hotel Century Sagami-Ono.

=== Platforms ===
1	■ Odakyu Enoshima Line	for Chuo-Rinkan, Yamato, Shonandai, Fujisawa, and Katase-Enoshima
2	■ Odakyu Odawara Line	for Hon-Atsugi, Shin-Matsuda, and Odawara
3	■ Odakyu Odawara Line	for Kyodo, Shimo-Kitazawa, Yoyogi-Uehara, and Shinjuku; Tokyo Metro Chiyoda Line for Ayase
4	■ Odakyu Odawara Line	for Kyodo, Shimo-Kitazawa, Yoyogi-Uehara, and Shinjuku; Tokyo Metro Chiyoda Line for Ayase

== History ==
The station opened on April 1, 1938, as Tsūshin-Gakkō Station (通信学校駅), named after the nearby Imperial Japanese Army Telecommunication School (Rikugun Tsūshin-Gakkō). It was renamed Sagami-Ono on January 1, 1941, as part of the counter-intelligence movement to eliminate the names of military facilities from maps.

Station numbering was introduced in January 2014 with Sagami-Ono being assigned station number OH28.

On September 2, 2024, Alexandros' song "Wataridori" began being used as the approach melody.

== Passenger statistics ==
In fiscal 2019, the station was used by an average of 127,169 passengers daily.

The passenger figures for previous years are as shown below.

Fiscal year	daily average
2005	113,093
2010	119,166
2015	129,015

== Surrounding area ==
- ~~Isetan Sagamihara (department store)~~→Closed.
- bono SAGAMIONO
- Okadaya MORE's
- Ono Ginza(大野銀座)(Shopping street)
- Minami Ward office
- Sagami Women's University
- National Route 16
- Kitasato University (Sagamihara campus)
- Joshibi University of Art and Design

== Bus services ==
The following express bus services operate from the station.

- Narita Airport, operated jointly by Kanachu and Keisei Bus
- Haneda Airport, operated jointly by Kanachu and Keikyu Bus

== See also ==
- List of railway stations in Japan
