= Katase-Enoshima Station =

Railway station in Fujisawa, Kanagawa Prefecture, Japan

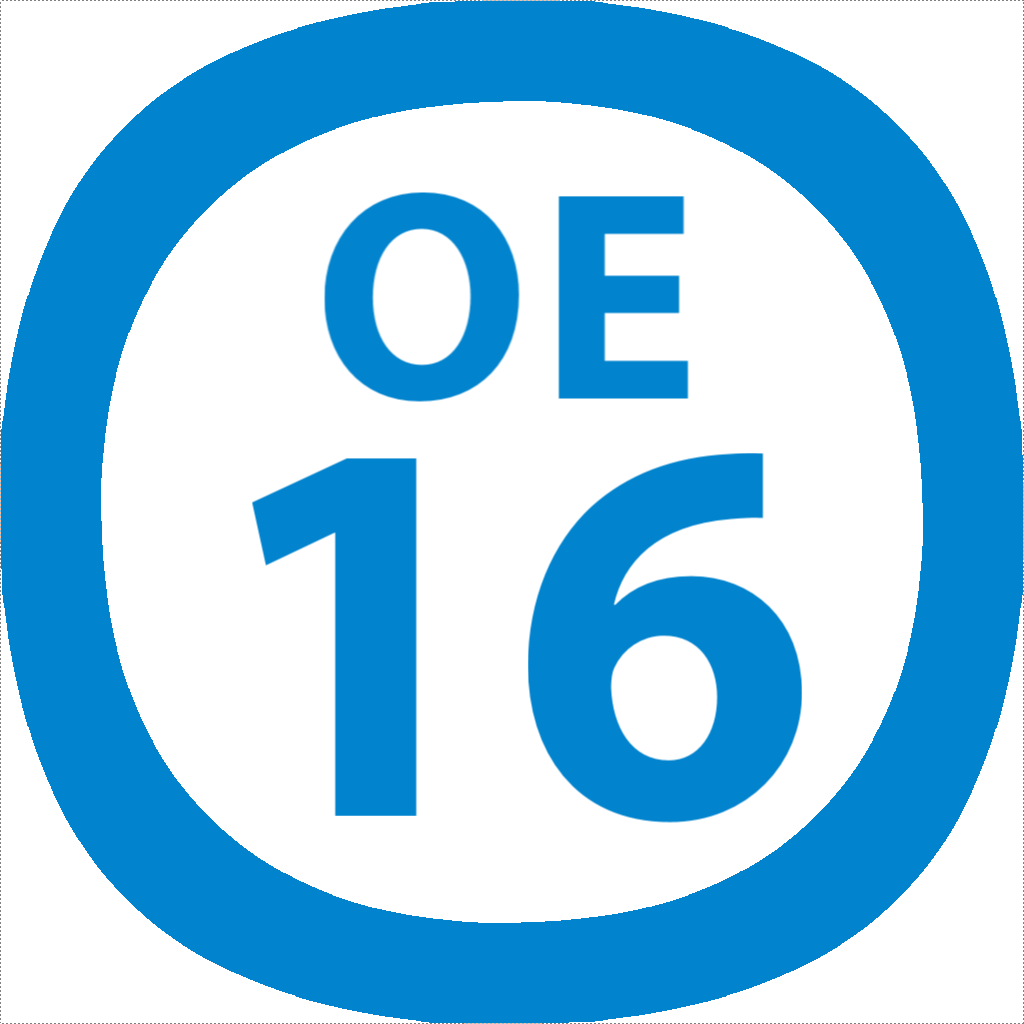
Katase-Enoshima Station 片瀬江ノ島

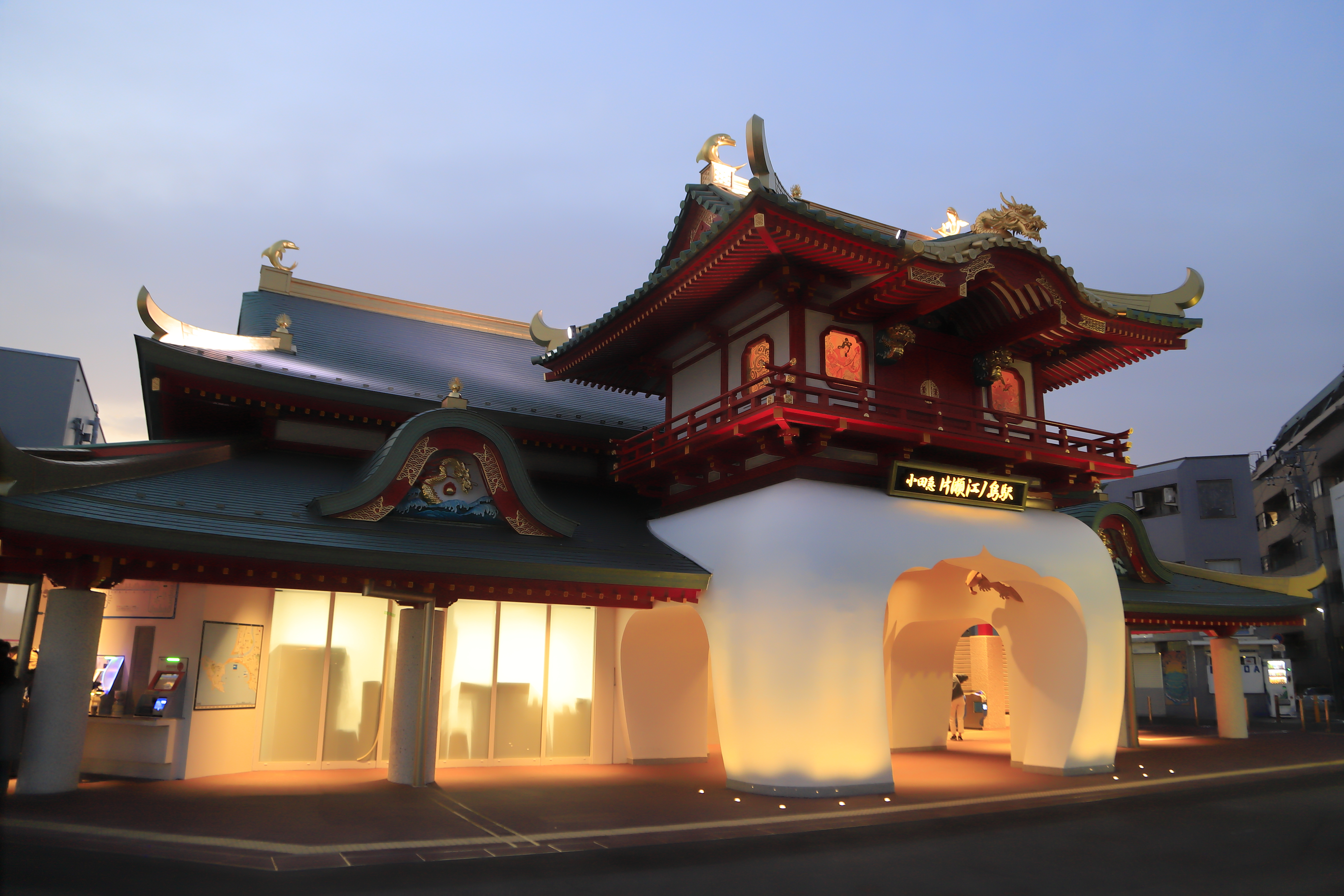
- Katase-Enoshima Station, March 2020

General information
- Location: 2-15-3 Katase-Kaigan, Fujisawa-shi, Kanagawa-ken 251-0035; Japan
- Coordinates: 35°18′32″N 139°29′00″E
- Operator: Odakyu Electric Railway
- Line: Odakyu Enoshima Line
- Distance: 27.6 km from Sagami-Ōno
- Platforms: 2 bay platforms
- Tracks: 3
- Connections: Bus terminal

Other information
- Station code: OE16
- Website: Official website

History
- Opened: 1 April 1929
- Rebuilt: 2018-2020

Passengers
- FY2019: 19,828 daily

Services
Preceding station	Odakyu	Following station
Terminus	Romancecar	Fujisawa towards Shinjuku or Kita-Senju
Terminus	Enoshima Line Express	Fujisawa towards Sagami-Ōno
Terminus	Enoshima Line Local	Kugenuma-Kaigan towards Sagami-Ōno
Location
- Location within Kanagawa Prefecture Location within Japan

Katase-Enoshima Station (片瀬江ノ島駅, Katase-Enoshima-eki) is a passenger railway station located in the city of Fujisawa, Kanagawa, Japan and operated by the private railway operator Odakyu Electric Railway.

== Lines ==
Katase-Enoshima Station forms the southern terminus of the 27.6 km Odakyu Enoshima Line starting at Sagami-Ōno. It is 59.9 kilometers from the Tokyo terminus of Odakyu at Shinjuku Station. It is also within walking distance of Enoshima Station on the Enoshima Electric Railway (Enoden) and Shonan-Enoshima Station on the Shonan Monorail.

== Station layout ==
Katase-Enoshima Station has two bay platforms serving three tracks, which are connected to the station building by a footbridge. The station building is designed to evoke the image of Ryūgū-jō, or Dragon Palace, the underwater dwelling in the Urashima Taro fable.

=== Platforms ===
1, 2	■ Odakyu Enoshima Line	for Fujisawa, Sagami-Ōno, and Shinjuku
3	■ Odakyu Enoshima Line	for alighting passengers only
4	■ Odakyu Enoshima Line	for Fujisawa, Sagami-Ōno, and Shinjuku

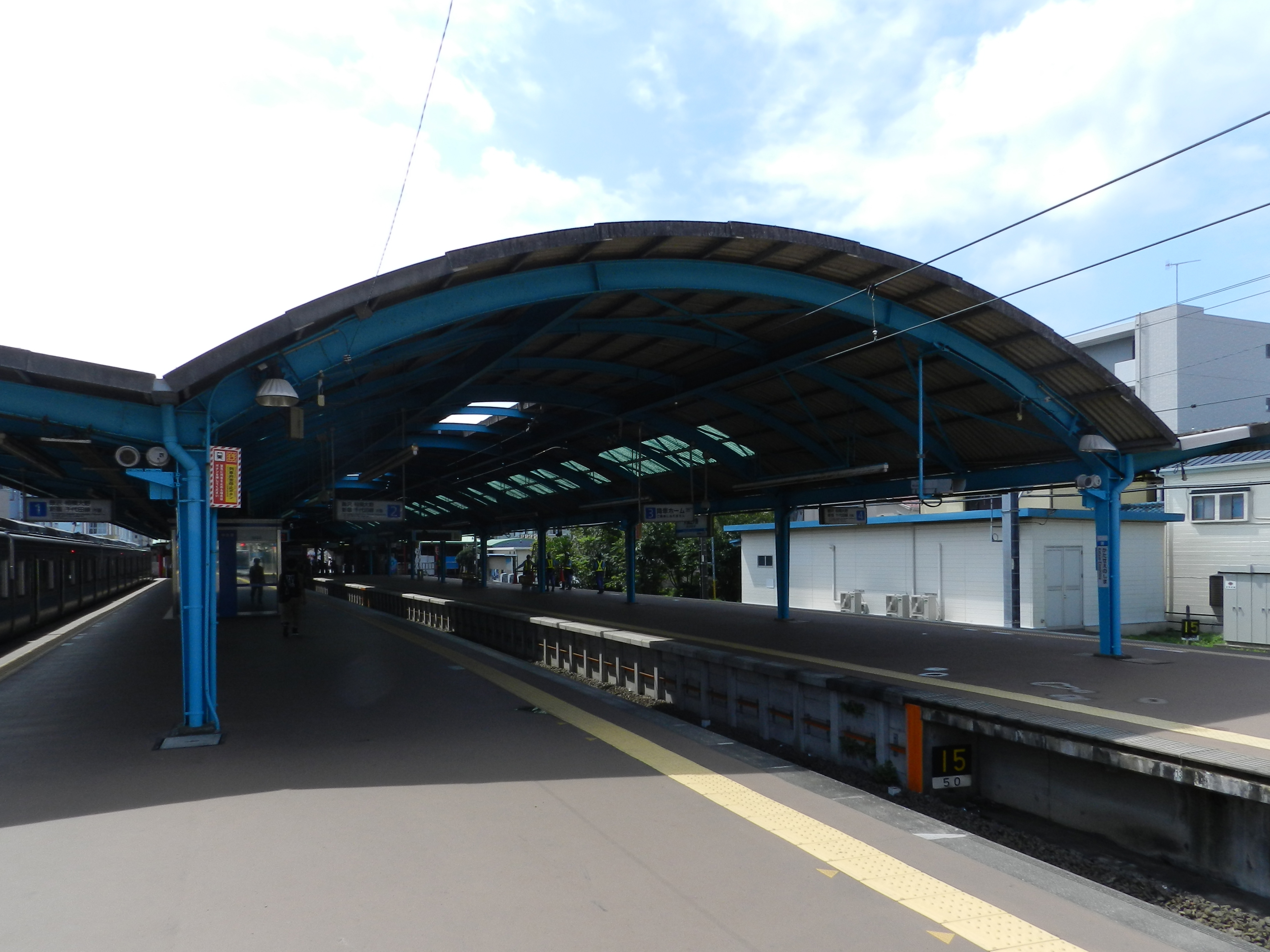
The platforms in July 2012

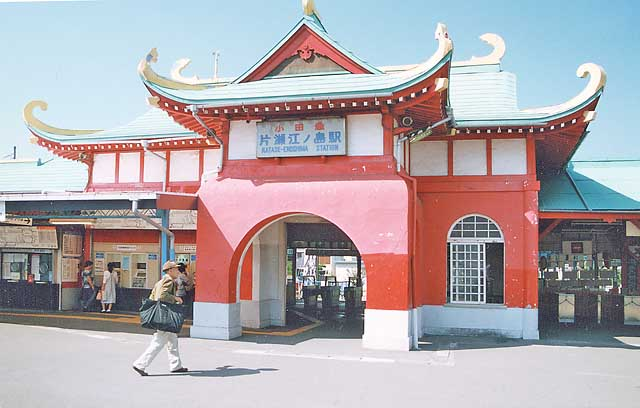
The station in 2004, before being rebuilt

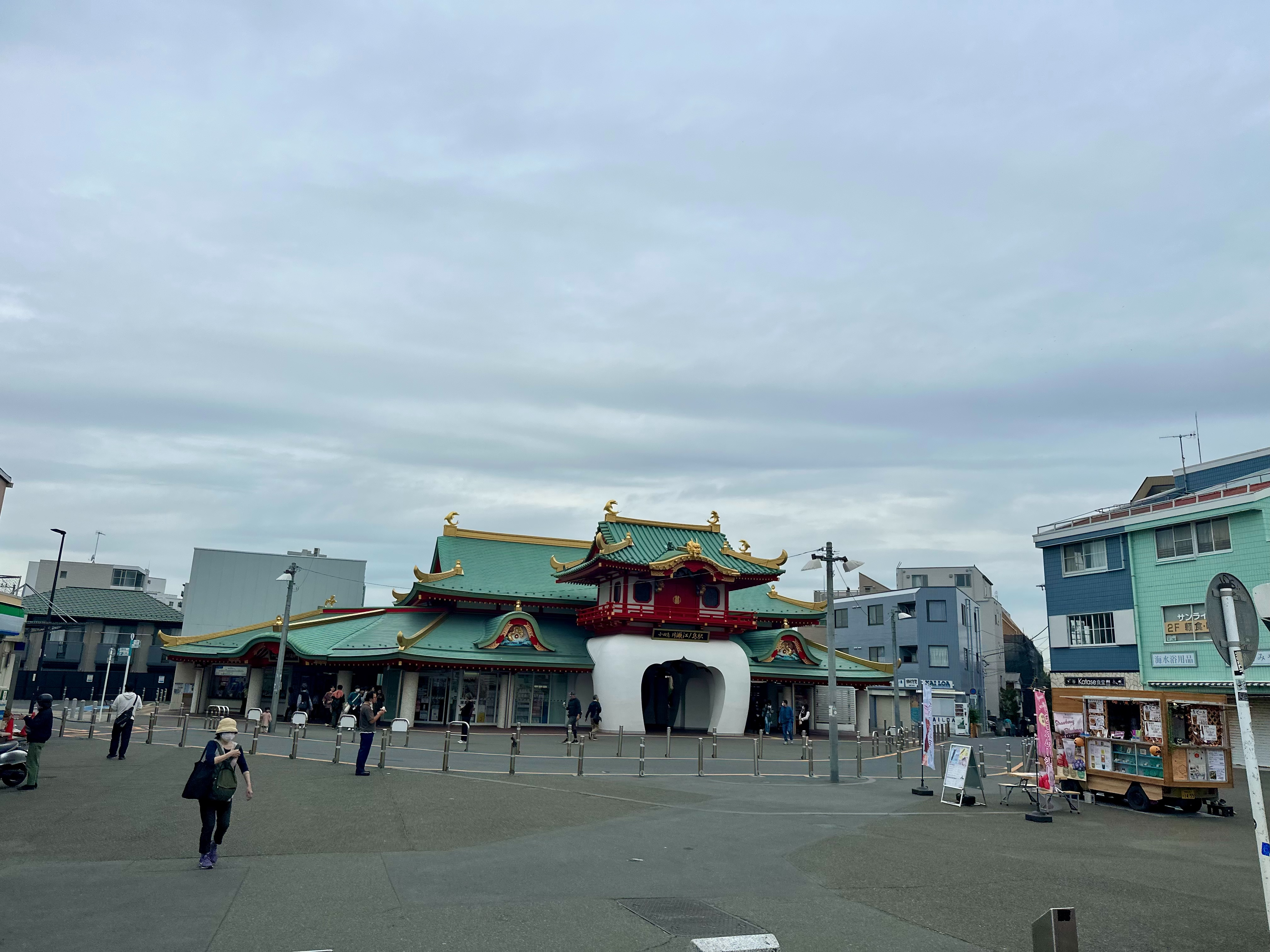
The station and surrounding area during the day, 2023

== History ==
Katase-Enoshima Station opened on April 1, 1929.

Work commenced in February 2018 to rebuild and modernize the station, and was completed at the end of July 2020.

== Passenger statistics ==
In fiscal 2019, the station was used by an average of 19,828 passengers daily.

The passenger figures for previous years are as shown below.

Fiscal year	daily average
2005	17,024
2010	18,391
2015	20,692

== Surrounding area ==
- Enoshima Station (Enoshima Electric Railway)
- Shonan-Enoshima Station (Shonan Monorail)
- Enoshima

== See also ==
- List of railway stations in Japan
