= Hikiji River =

River in Kanagawa, Japan

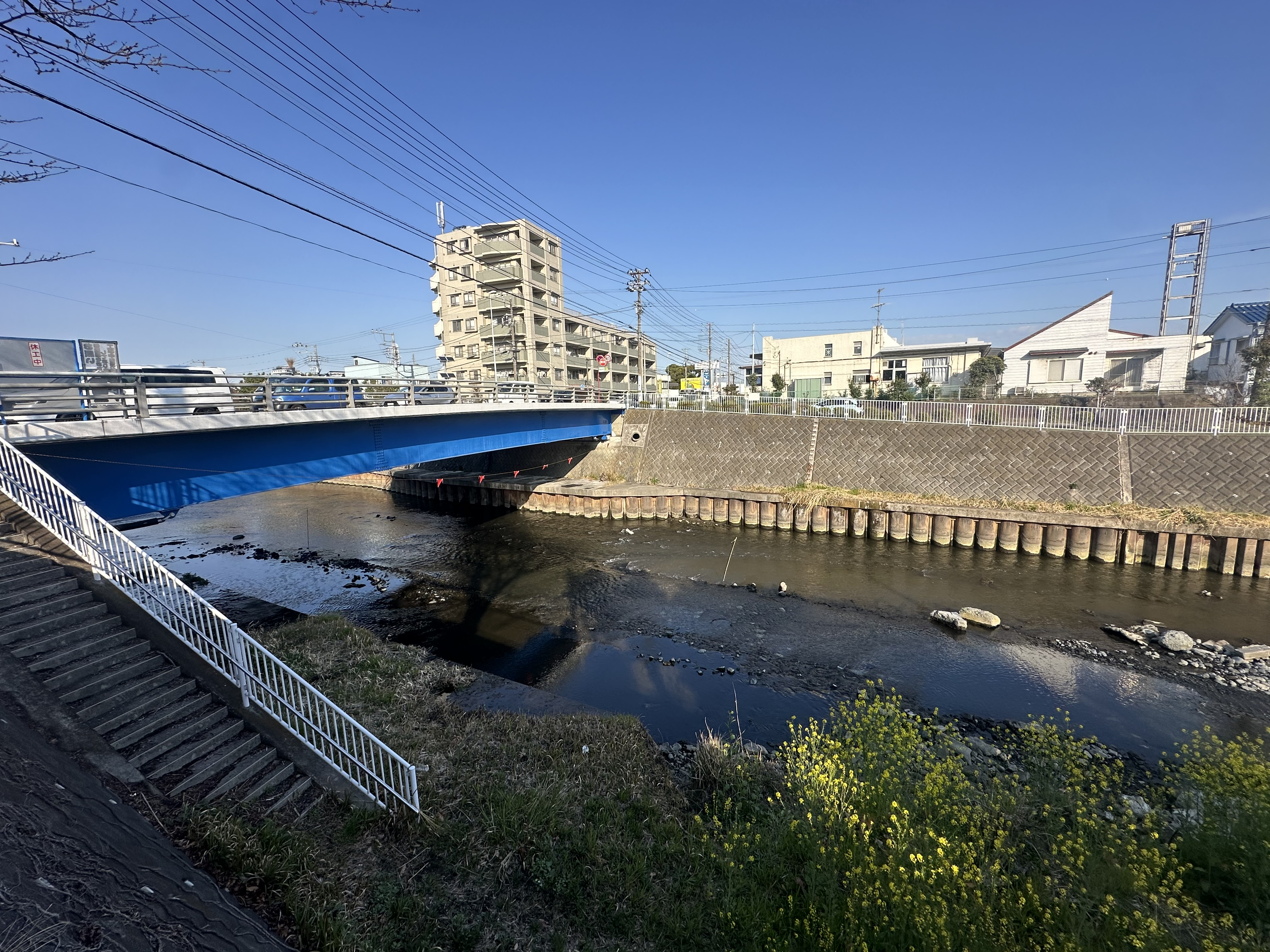
- Hikiji River and Fujimi Bridge in Fujisawa

- Location within Japan
- Native name: 引地川 (Japanese)

Location
- Country: Japan

Physical characteristics
- Source: Izumi no Mori
  - location: Yamato, Kanagawa Prefecture, Japan
  - coordinates: 35°28′45″N 139°26′34″E
- Mouth
  - location: Sagami Bay at Fujisawa, Kanagawa Prefecture, Japan
  - elevation: 0 m (0 ft)
- Length: 21.3 km (13.2 mi)
- Basin size: 67 km^{2} (26 sq mi)

The Hikiji River (引地川, Hikijigawa) is a Class B river in Kanagawa Prefecture, Japan. It is also called Hikichi River (ひきちがわ, Hikichigawa) and Hikiji River (ひきぢがわ, Hikijigawa).

The mouth of the river is known unagi spawning.

== Geography ==
The source of the Hikiji River is Izumi no Mori (literally "Forest of Springs"), a park located in near the center of the Sagamino plateau in the Kamisōyagi area of Yamato in Kanagawa Prefecture, Japan. The park area was formed from the erosion of the diluvial plateau by the waters flowing south from the springs, forming a valley.

It flows through the Inari neighborhood Shōnan dunes Fujisawa City and through Shōnan Kaigan Park in the Kugenuma-Kaigan neighborhood before emptying into Sagami Bay.

The Hikiji River has an overall length of 21.3 kilometres (13.2 mi), a watershed of 67 square kilometres (26 mi^{2}), and is classified as a Class B river. The watershed includes portions of six cities, including Fujisawa, Chigasaki, Yamato, Ebina, Zama, and Ayase. The 4.46 kilometres (2.77 mi) of the upper reach of the river down to Kanagawa Prefectural Route 45 Maruko Nakayama Chigasaki Route is considered a small, local river, and is under the management of the city of Yamato. From that point, it is considered a Class B river and under the management of Kanagawa Prefecture.

Segments of the river were formerly called Chōgo River (長後川, Chōgogawa), Ōba River (大庭川, Ōbagawa), Shimizu River (清水川, Shimizugawa), Hori River (堀川, Horikawa), and other names. The main tributaries are the Tate, Fudō, Isshiki, and Koito Rivers.

The middle part of the river flows across the bottom of the valley where it is used for rice paddies and other agricultural purposes. In order to draw water from the river, the city of Yamato established the Wakamiya Intake, and the city of Fujisawa built the Chōgo Sluice, the Nakamura Sluice, and the Ishikawa Sluice.

The river formerly meandered significantly where it exited the Shōnan Sand Dunes, changing location every time the river channel flooded. At the beginning of the Shōwa period, the current river channel was created through manual labor. Because the coastal current in Sagami Bay flows east where the Hikiji River flows into the bay, maps created during the Edo period show a confluence with the Sakai River.

== Features ==
The Hikiji River Riverside Promenade (引地川川べり遊歩道, Hikijigawa Kawaberi Yūhodō) opened on May 6, 1983. On December 10, 1987, the former Ministry of Construction designated it a "Model Hometown River Construction Project" (ふるさとの川モデル事業, Furusato no Kawa Modern Jigyō), and its popularity was enhanced with the construction of a dike and a man-made pond. The installation of municipal sewer systems and volunteer efforts to clean up garbage helped to noticeably improve the water quality along the river.
