= Minami-Rinkan Station =

Railway station in Yamato, Kanagawa Prefecture, Japan

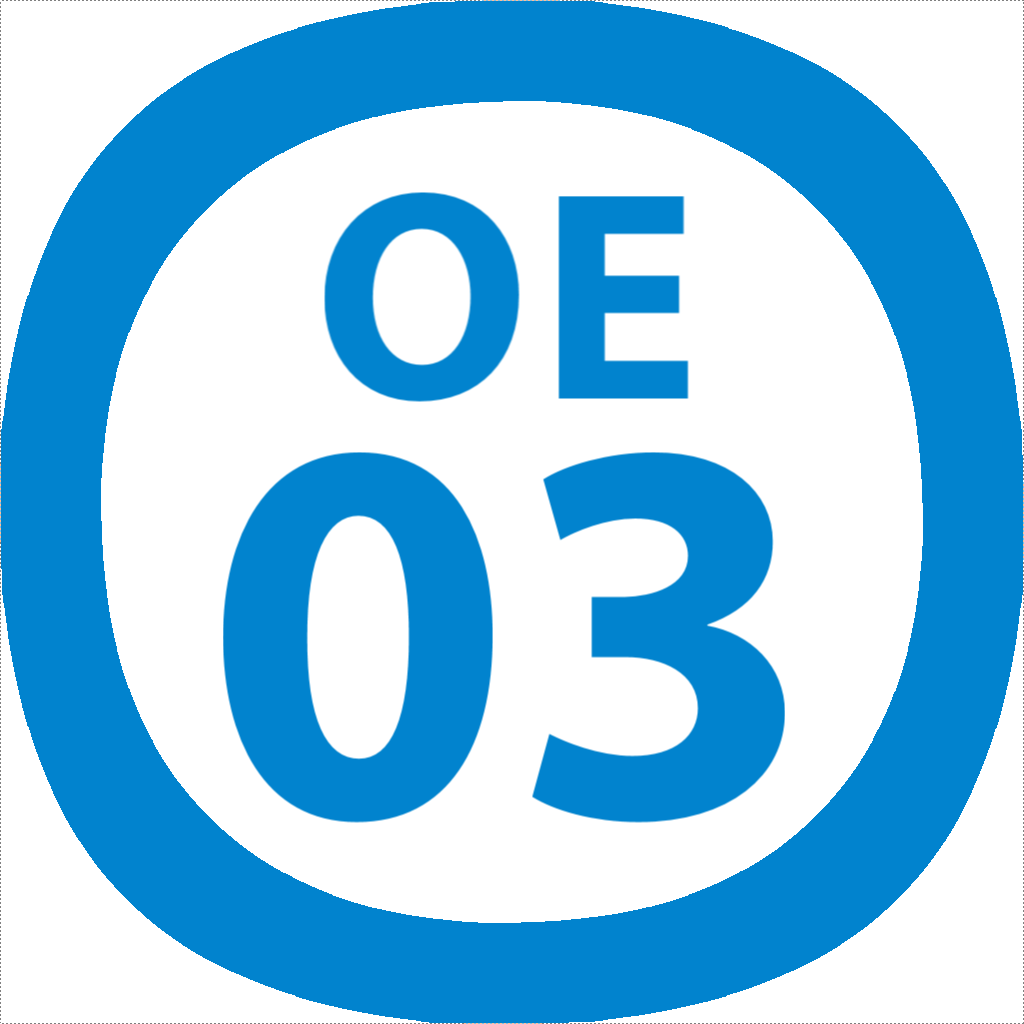
Minami-Rinkan Station 南林間駅

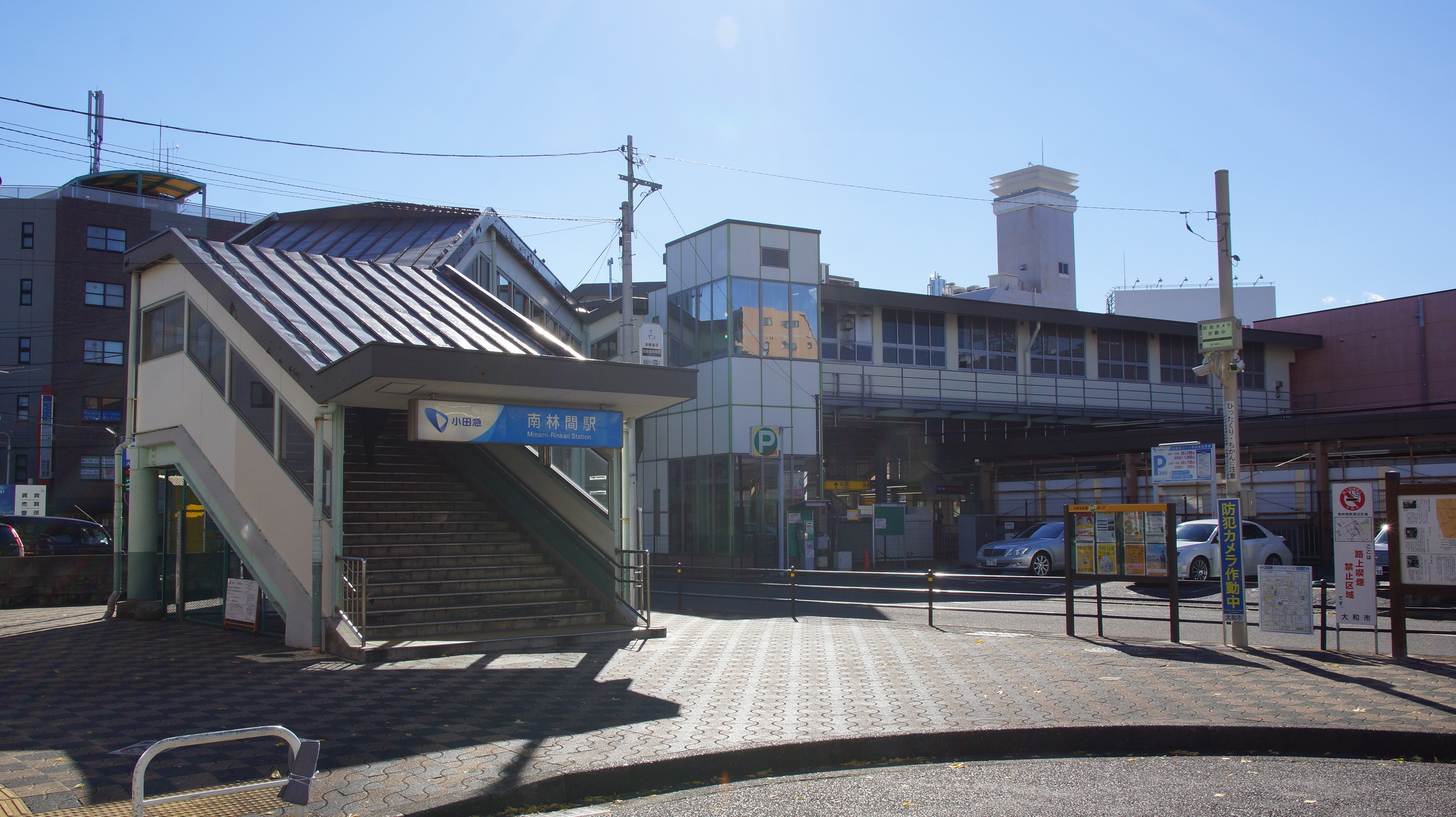
- The east entrance in December 2016

General information
- Location: 1-6-11 Minami-Rinkan, Yamato-shi, Kanagawa-ken 242-0006; Japan
- Coordinates: 35.495731°N 139.447998°E
- Operator: Odakyu Electric Railway
- Line: Odakyu Enoshima Line
- Distance: 36.8 km from Shinjuku
- Platforms: 2 side platforms
- Tracks: 2
- Connections: Bus stop

Other information
- Station code: OE-03
- Website: Official website

History
- Opened: 1 April 1929
- Former names: Minami-Rinkantoshi (until 1941)

Passengers
- FY2019: 34,021 daily

Services
Preceding station	Odakyu	Following station
Yamato towards Katase-Enoshima	Enoshima Line Express	Chūō-Rinkan towards Sagami-Ōno
Tsuruma towards Katase-Enoshima	Enoshima Line Local	Chūō-Rinkan towards Sagami-Ōno
Location
- Location within Kanagawa Prefecture Location within Japan

Minami-Rinkan Station (南林間駅, Minami-Rinkan-eki) is a passenger railway station located in the city of Yamato, Kanagawa, Japan and operated by the private railway operator Odakyu Electric Railway.

== Lines ==
Minami-Rinkan Station is served by the Odakyu Enoshima Line, with some through services to and from Shinjuku in Tokyo. It lies 36.8 kilometers from the Shinjuku terminus.

== Station layout ==
The station consists of two side platforms serving two tracks, which are connected to the station building by a footbridge.

=== Platforms ===
1	■ Odakyu Enoshima Line	for Fujisawa and Katase-Enoshima
2	■ Odakyu Enoshima Line	for Sagami-Ōno and Shinjuku

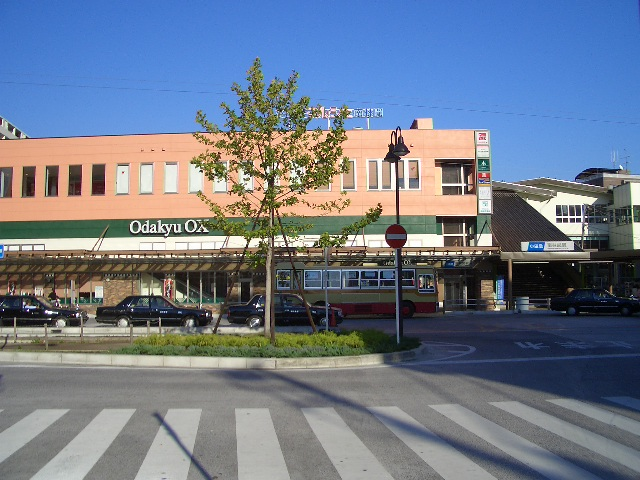
The west side of the station in November 2004

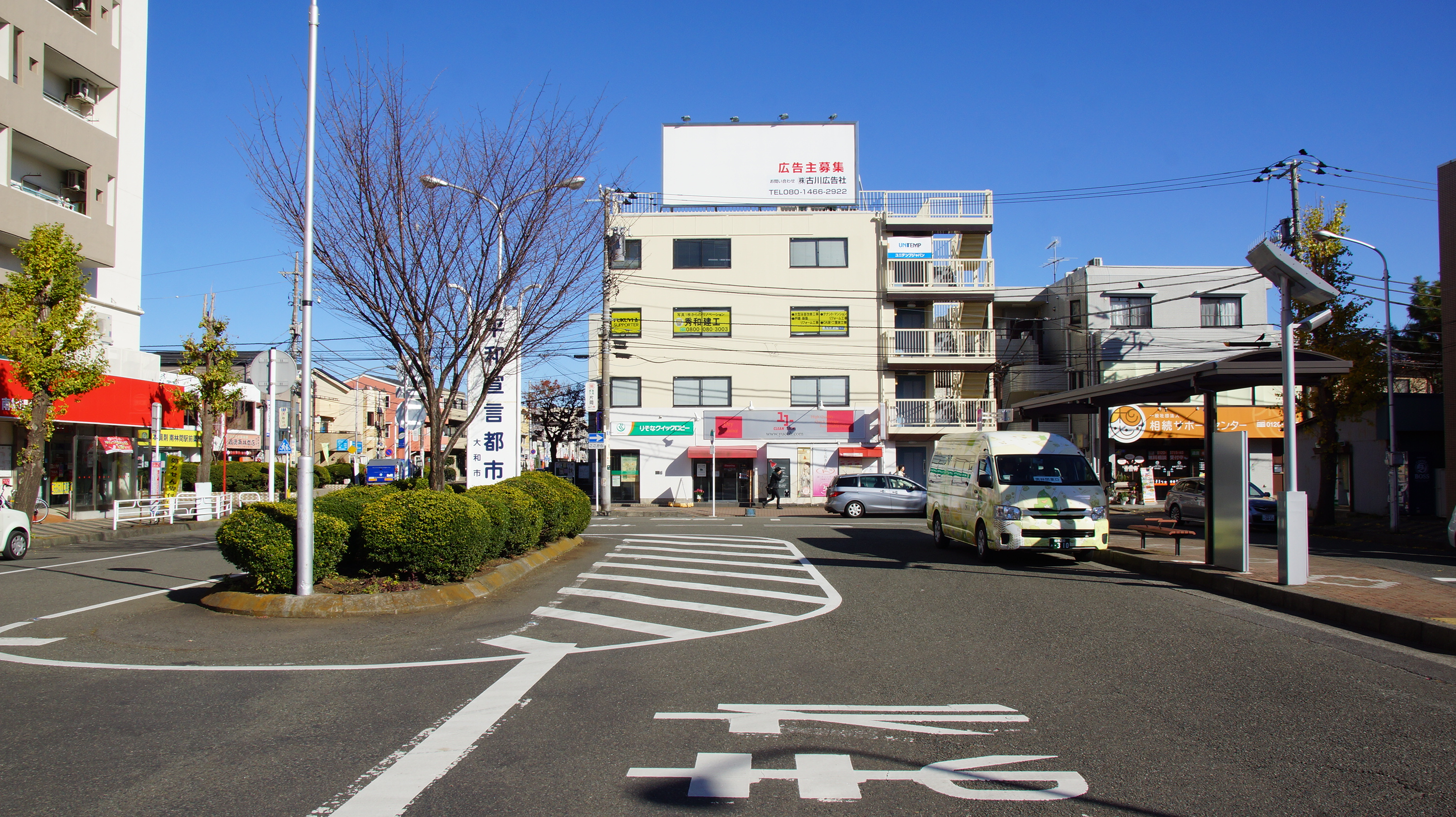
The forecourt on the east side of the station in December 2016

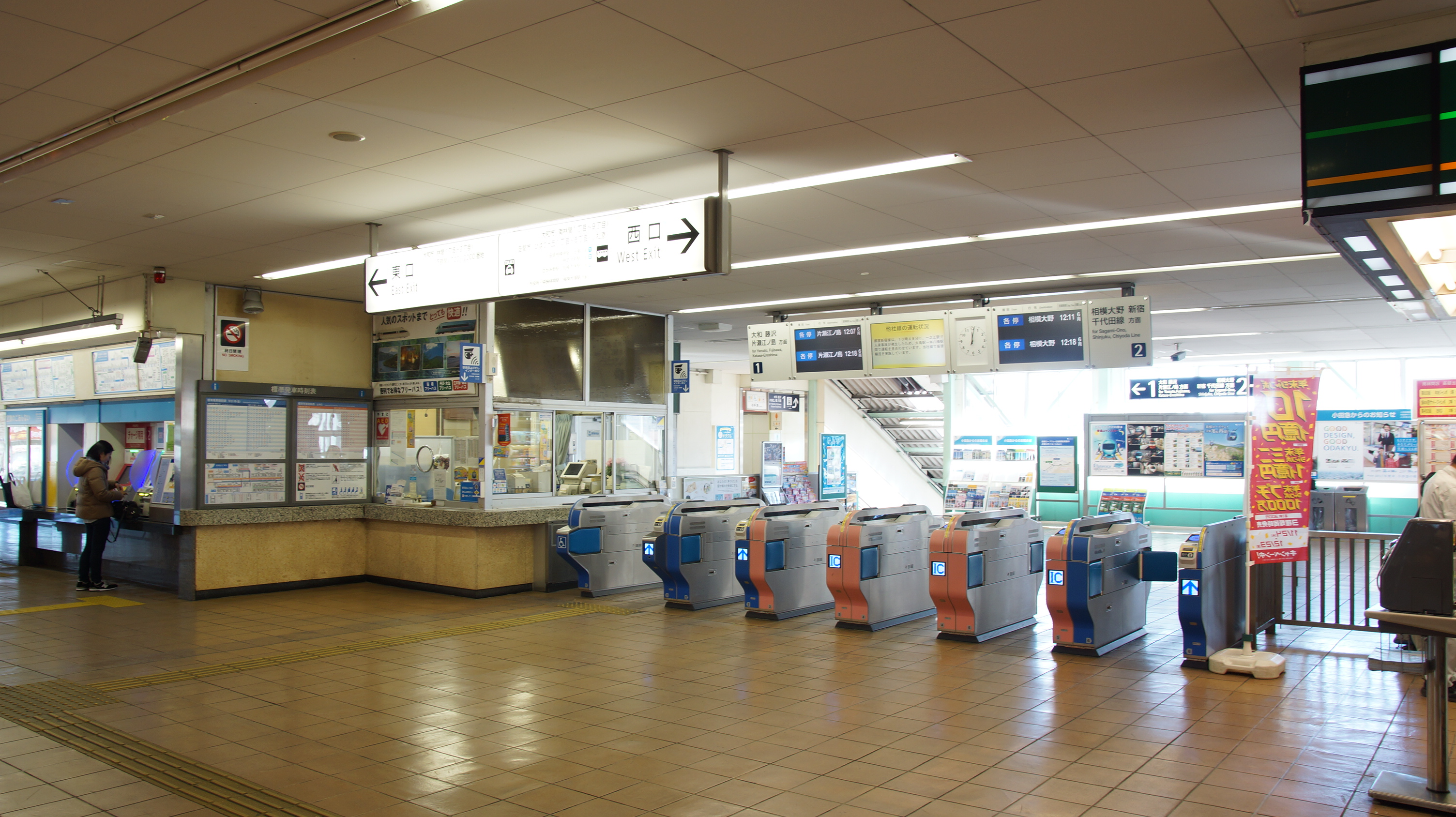
The ticket barriers in December 2016

== History ==
The station opened on April 1, 1929, as Minami-Rinkantoshi Station (南林間都市駅). It was renamed Minami-Rinkan on October 15, 1941.

== Passenger statistics ==
In fiscal 2019, the station was used by an average of 34,021 passengers daily.

The passenger figures for previous years are as shown below.

Fiscal year	daily average
2005	31,860
2010	32,346
2015	33,555

== Surrounding area ==
- St. Cecilia Women's Junior College
- Yamato City Tsuruma Junior High School
- Yamato Municipal Rinkan Elementary School

== See also ==
- List of railway stations in Japan
