= Kashiwadai Station =

Railway station in Ebina, Kanagawa Prefecture, Japan

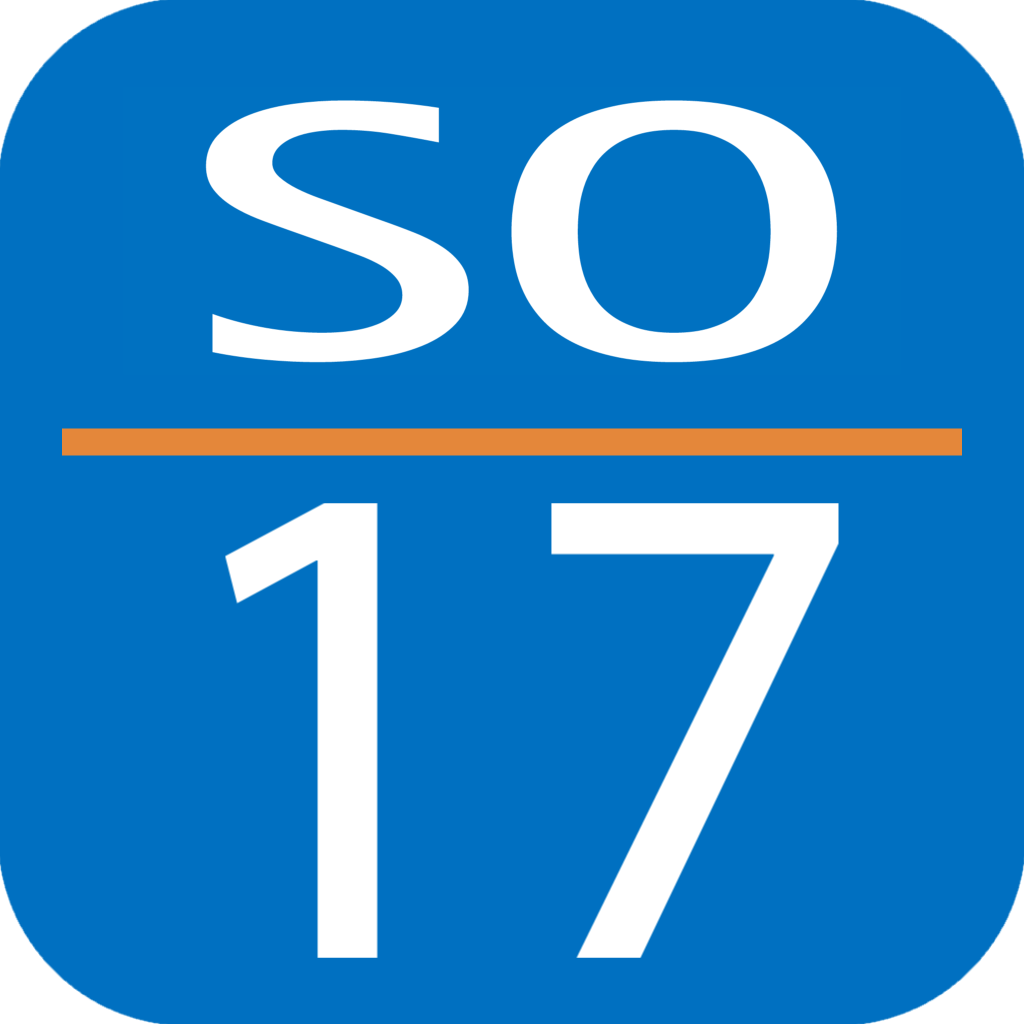
Kashiwadai Station かしわ台駅

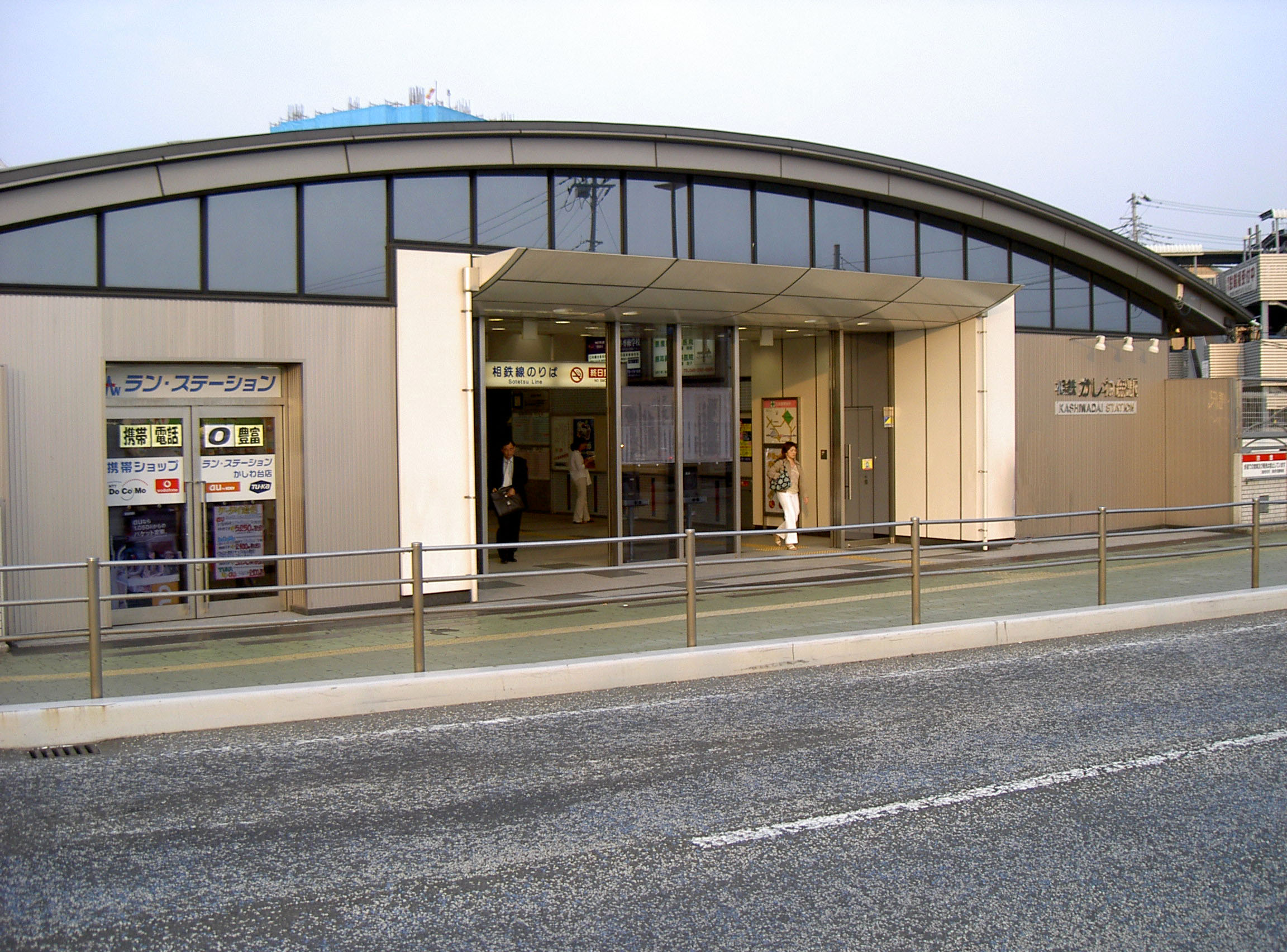
- West Exit of Kashiwadai Station

General information
- Location: 1026 Kashiwagaya, Ebina-shi, Kanagawa-ken 243-0402; Japan
- Coordinates: 35°28′0″N 139°24′56″E
- Operator: Sagami Railway
- Line: Sotetsu Main Line
- Distance: 21.8 km from Yokohama
- Platforms: 2 island platforms
- Tracks: 4
- Connections: Bus terminal

Construction
- Structure type: Ground level
- Accessible: Yes

Other information
- Station code: SO-17
- Website: Official website

History
- Opened: August 19, 1975

Passengers
- FY2019: 18,666 daily

Services
Preceding station	Sagami Railway	Following station
Ebina Terminus	Sōtetsu Main Line Commuter Express Rapid Local	Sagamino towards Yokohama
Ebina Terminus	Sōtetsu–JR Link Line Local	Sagamino towards Shinjuku
Location
- Location within Kanagawa Prefecture Location within Japan

Kashiwadai Station (かしわ台駅, Kashiwadai-eki) is a passenger railway station located in the city of Ebina, Kanagawa, Japan and operated by the private railway operator Sagami Railway (Sotetsu). It is located near the border of Ebina with Zama and Ayase.

== Lines ==
Kashiwadai Station is served by the Sotetsu Main Line, and is 21.8 kilometers from the terminus of the line at Yokohama.

== Station layout ==
The station consists of two island platforms connected by an elevated station building located above the platforms and tracks.

=== Platforms ===
1, 2	■ Sotetsu Main Line	for Ebina
3, 4	■ Sotetsu Main Line	for Yamato, Yokohama and Shin-Yokohama

== History ==
Kashiwadai Station was opened on August 19, 1975 on the site of the former Kashiwadai train factory operated by the Sagami Railway since 1967.

== Passenger statistics ==
In fiscal 2019, the station was used by an average of 18,666 passengers daily.

The passenger figures for previous years are as shown below.

Fiscal year	daily average
2005	19,333
2010	19,048
2015	19,147

== Surrounding area ==
- Shoyo Kashiwadai Hospital

== See also ==
- List of railway stations in Japan
