= Izumi no Mori =

Park in Yamato, Japan

- 泉の森
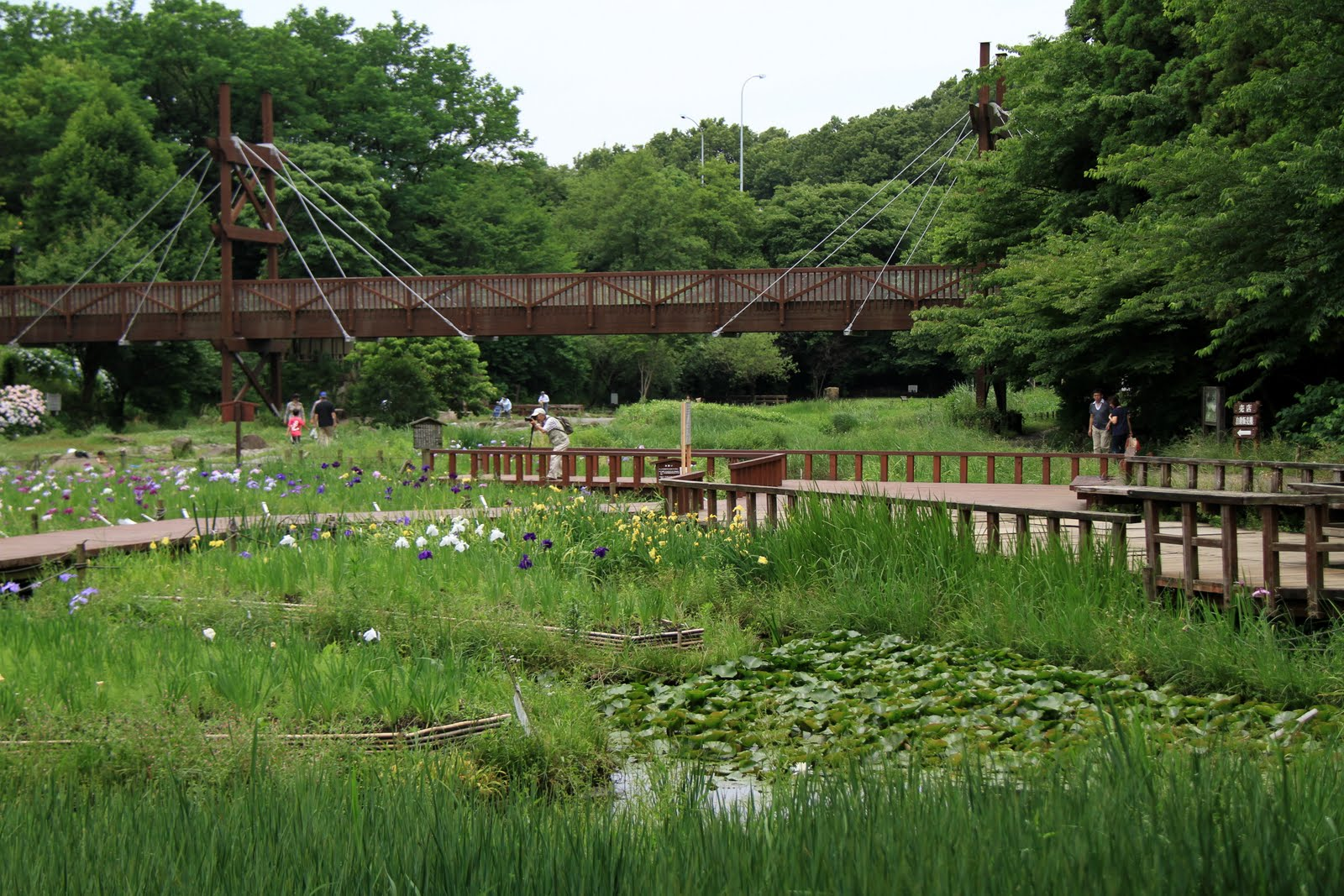
- Izumi no Mori Park
- Interactive map of Izumi no Mori
- Location: Yamato, Kanagawa Prefecture, Japan
- Coordinates: 35°28′45″N 139°26′34″E
- Area: 42 hectares (0.16 mi^{2})
- Open: Always open
- Status: Open all year
- Camp sites: Yes
- Paths: Mostly raised, wooden
- Water: Springs, ponds, streams
- Parking: 156 spaces
- Public transit: Yamato City Community Bus (stop in front of the park); Sagami-Ōtsuka Station (15 min. walk); Yamato Station (25 min. walk); Tsuruma Station (25 min. walk)
- Website: www.yamato-zaidan.or.jp/izumi

Izumi no Mori (泉の森; lit. "Forest of Springs") is a park in Yamato, Kanagawa Prefecture, Japan. The springs in the park are the source of the Hikiji River that flows into Sagami Bay.

== Access and facilities ==
Izumi no Mori has up to 156 parking spaces for individual cars, depending on the season. The park is close to public transportation, including a bus stop served by the Yamato City Community Bus directly in front of the southern end of the park. Sagami-Ōtsuka Station, on the Sōtetsu Main Line is a 15-minute walk from the park. Both Yamato Station (on the Sōtetsu Main Line and Odakyū Enoshima Line) and Tsuruma Station (on the Odakyū Enoshima Line) are 25-minute walks from the park. Naval Air Facility Atsugi is also located nearby.

Japan National Route 246 goes through the middle of the park.

The park includes a water plants area, a bridge from which the greenery can be observed, a working watermill, a number of minka, a campsite, and a nature observation area.

== Flora and fauna ==
A variety of plants and animals can be viewed in the park, including:

- Japanese hornet
- Tanuki
