= Sagamino Station =

Railway station in Ebina, Kanagawa Prefecture, Japan

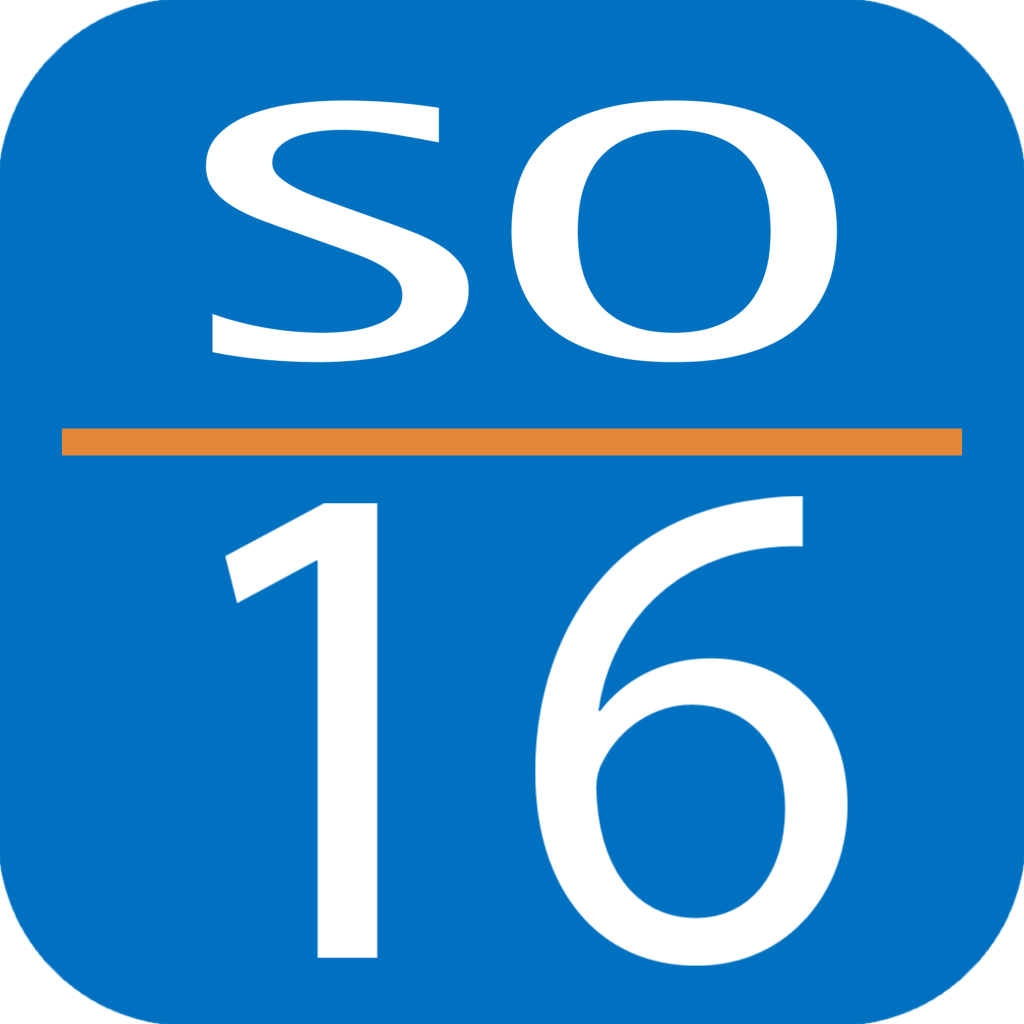
Sagamino Station さがみ野

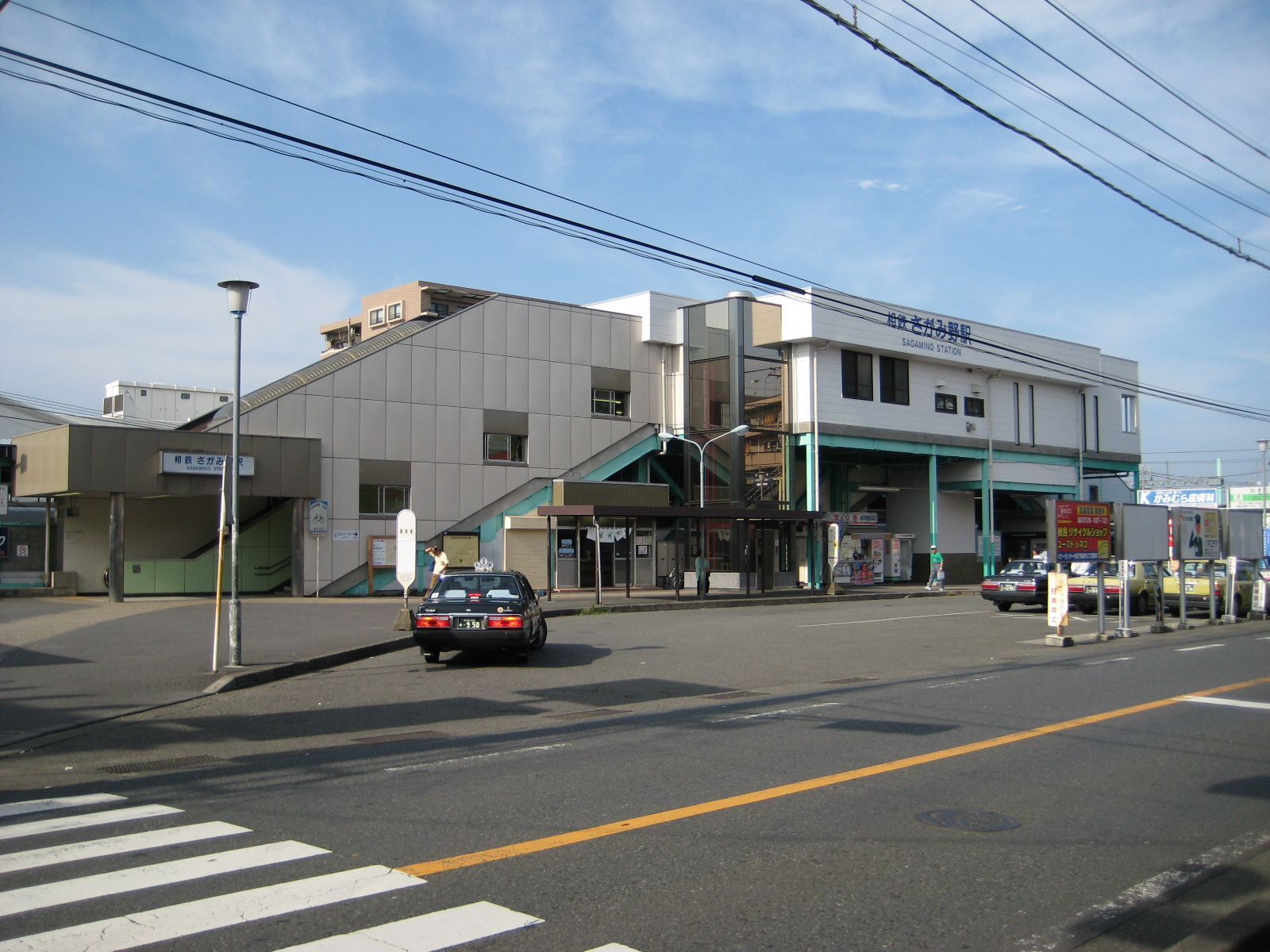
- Sagamino Station south exit, August 2007

General information
- Location: Higashi-Kashiwagaya 2-30-28, Ebina-shi, Kanagawa-ken 243-0401; Japan
- Coordinates: 35°28′17″N 139°25′42″E
- Operator: Sagami Railway
- Line: Sotetsu Main Line
- Distance: 20.5 km from Yokohama
- Platforms: 2 side platforms
- Connections: Bus terminal

Other information
- Station code: SO-16
- Website: Official website

History
- Opened: August 19, 1975

Passengers
- FY2019: 37,399 daily

Services
| Preceding station | Sagami Railway | Following station |
|---|---|---|
| Kashiwadai towards Ebina | Sōtetsu Main Line Commuter Express Rapid Local | Sagami-Ōtsuka towards Yokohama |
| Kashiwadai towards Ebina | Sōtetsu–JR Link Line Local | Sagami-Ōtsuka towards Shinjuku |
Location
- Location within Kanagawa Prefecture Location within Japan

Sagamino Station (さがみ野駅, Sagamino eki) is a passenger railway station located in the city of Ebina, Kanagawa, Japan and operated by the private railway operator Sagami Railway (Sotetsu). It is located near the border of Ebina with Zama and Ayase, and is convenient for many American servicemembers stationed at the Naval Air Facility Atsugi.

== Lines ==
Sagamino Station is served by the Sotetsu Main Line, and is 20.5 kilometers from the terminus of the line at Yokohama.

== Station layout ==
The station consists of two side platforms connected to an elevated station building located above the platforms and tracks.

=== Platforms ===
| 1 | ■ Sotetsu Main Line | for Ebina |
| 2 | ■ Sotetsu Main Line | for Yamato, Yokohama and Shin-Yokohama |

== History ==
Sagamino Station was opened on August 19, 1975. There was a short spur line which branched from the station to Atsugi base. While the track remains in place up to the fence of the base, the line is no longer in use.

== Passenger statistics ==
In fiscal 2019, the station was used by an average of 37,399 passengers daily.

The passenger figures for previous years are as shown below.

| Fiscal year | daily average |
|---|---|
| 2005 | 36,503 |
| 2010 | 36,926 |
| 2015 | 37,876 |

== Surrounding area ==
- Sagamino Central Hospital

== See also ==
- List of railway stations in Japan
