= Sagami-Ōtsuka Station =

Railway station in Yamato, Kanagawa Prefecture, Japan

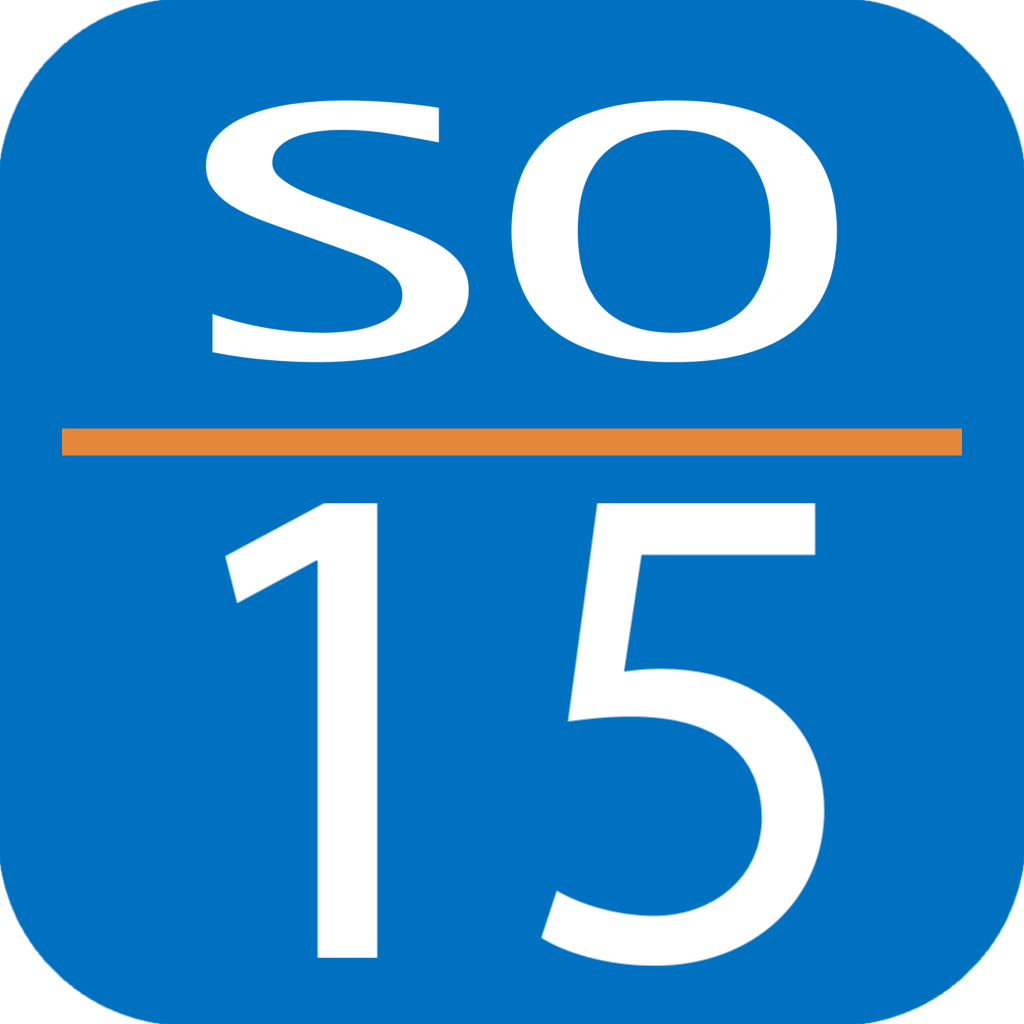
Sagami-Ōtsuka Station 相模大塚駅

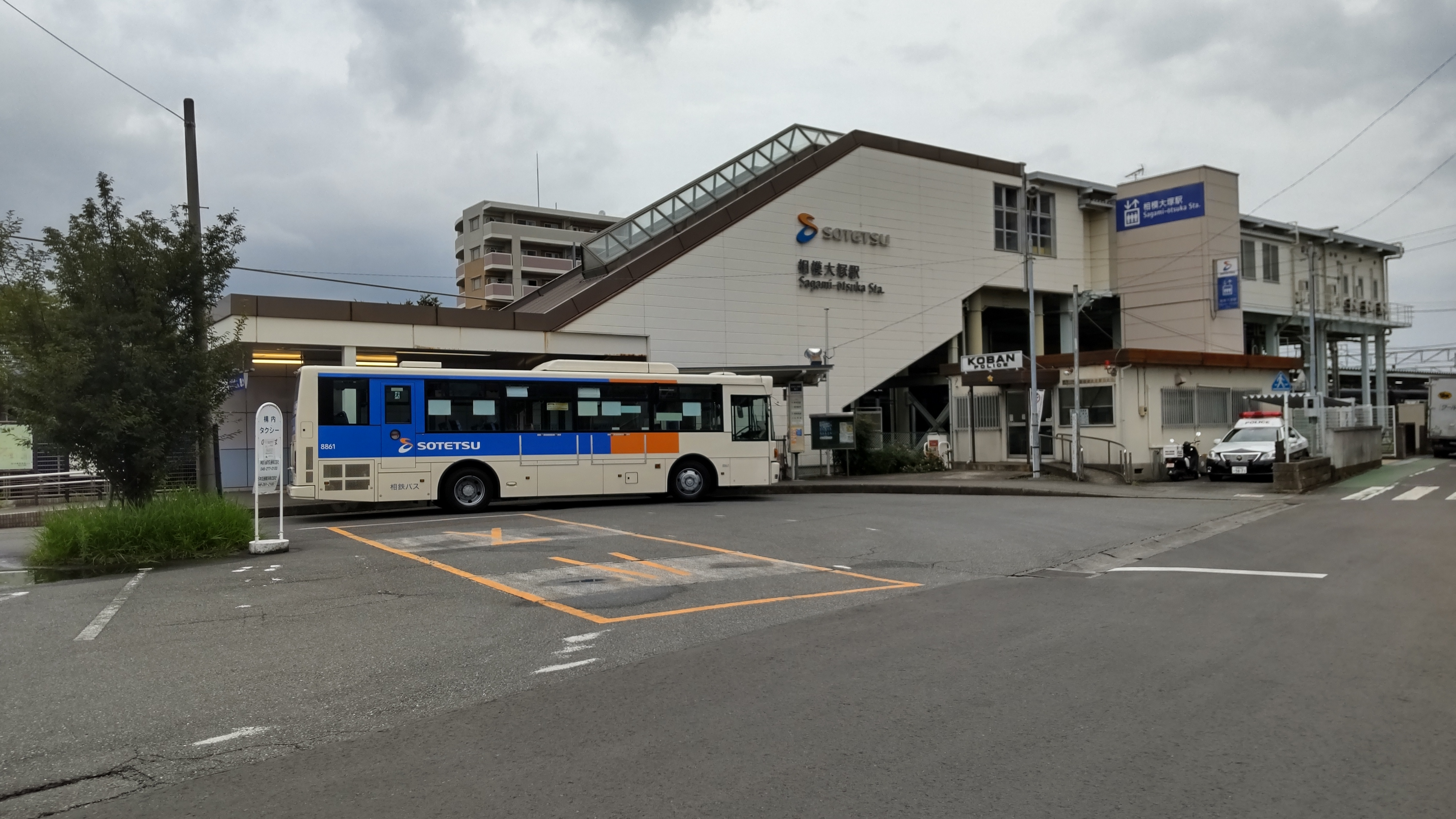
- Sagami-Ōtsuka Station

General information
- Location: Sakuramori 3-chome, Yamato-shi, Kanagawa-ken 242-0028; Japan
- Coordinates: 35.4705442°N 139.4408798°E
- Operator: Sagami Railway
- Line: Sotetsu Main Line
- Distance: 19.3 km from Yokohama
- Platforms: 1 island platform
- Tracks: 2
- Connections: Bus stop

Other information
- Station code: SO-15
- Website: Official website

History
- Opened: May 12, 1926

Passengers
- FY2019: 14,283 daily

Services
Preceding station	Sagami Railway	Following station
Sagamino towards Ebina	Sōtetsu Main Line Commuter Express Rapid Local	Yamato towards Yokohama
Sagamino towards Ebina	Sōtetsu–JR Link Line Local	Yamato towards Shinjuku
Location
- Location within Kanagawa Prefecture Location within Japan

Sagami-Ōtsuka Station (相模大塚駅, Sagami-Ōtsuka eki) is a passenger railway station located in the city of Yamato, Kanagawa, Japan and operated by the private railway operator Sagami Railway (Sotetsu). The station is convenient for many American servicemembers stationed at the Naval Air Facility Atsugi.

== Lines ==
Sagami-Ōtsuka Station is served by the Sotetsu Main Line, and is 19.3 kilometers from the terminus of the line at Yokohama.

== Station layout ==
The station consists of an island platform connected to an elevated station building located above the platforms and tracks.

=== Platforms ===
1	■ Sotetsu Main Line	for Ebina
2	■ Sotetsu Main Line	for Yamato, Yokohama and Shin-Yokohama

== History ==
Sagami-Ōtsuka Station was opened on May 12, 1926 as a station of the Jinchū Railway. It was relocated to its present location in 1943

== Passenger statistics ==
In fiscal 2019, the station was used by an average of 14,283 passengers daily.

The passenger figures for previous years are as shown below.

Fiscal year	daily average
2005	13,685
2010	13,028
2015	13,441

== Surrounding area ==
- Japan National Route 246
- Naval Air Facility Atsugi.
- Tomei Expressway
- Izumi no Mori, a nature park operated by the city of Yamato.

== See also ==
- List of railway stations in Japan
