= Ayase, Kanagawa =

Ayase 綾瀬市
- City
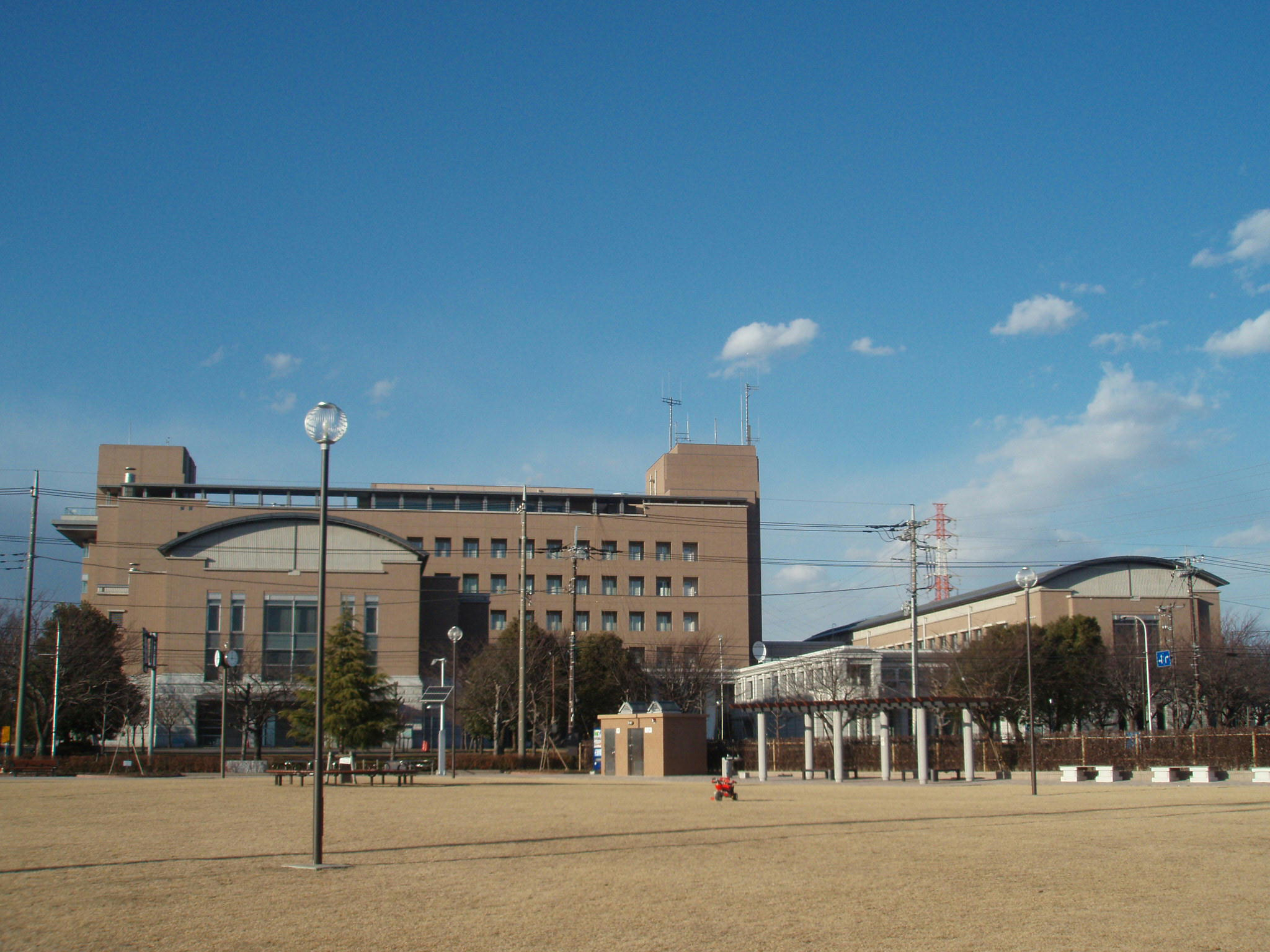
- Ayase City Hall

- Flag Emblem

- Location of Ayase in Kanagawa Prefecture

- Coordinates: 35°26′N 139°26′E
- Country: Japan
- Region: Kantō
- Prefecture: Kanagawa

Government
  - Mayor: Yoshihiko Kitsukawa (since July 2024)

Area
  - Total: 22.28 km^{2} (8.60 sq mi)

Population (June 1, 2021)
  - Total: 83,709
  - Density: 3,757/km^{2} (9,731/sq mi)
- Time zone: UTC+9 (Japan Standard Time)
- City symbols
  - Tree: Maple
  - Flower: Rose
  - Bird: Common kingfisher
- Phone number: 0467-77-1111
- Address: 550 Hayakawa, Ayase-shi, Kanagawa-ken 252-1192
- Website: Official website

Ayase (綾瀬市, Ayase-shi; Japanese pronunciation: [ä́.jä̀.sè̞, ä̀.jä́.sé̞.ɕì]) is a city located in Kanagawa Prefecture, Japan. As of 1 June 2021, the city had an estimated population of 83,709 and a population density of 3800 persons per km^{2}. The total area of the city is 22.28 km^{2} (8.60 sq mi).

== Geography ==
Ayase is in the plains of north-central Kanagawa Prefecture along the banks of the Sagami River. The Hikiji River flows through part of the city. More than 18% of the city is occupied by the Naval Air Facility Atsugi (equivalent to about 78% of the total area of the base).

=== Surrounding municipalities ===
Kanagawa Prefecture

- Ebina
- Fujisawa
- Yamato

=== Climate ===
Ayase has a humid subtropical climate (Köppen Cfa) characterized by warm summers and cool winters with light to no snowfall. The average annual temperature in Ayase is 15.2 °C. The average annual rainfall is 1632 mm with September as the wettest month. The temperatures are highest on average in August, at around 25.6 °C, and lowest in January, at around 5.2 °C.

== Demographics ==
Per Japanese census data, the population of Ayase grew rapidly during the late 20th century and has plateaued in the 21st.

Historical population
Year	Pop.	±%
1920	5,759	—
1930	5,665	−1.6%
1940	5,966	+5.3%
1950	8,181	+37.1%
1960	8,304	+1.5%
1970	24,960	+200.6%
1980	65,708	+163.3%
1990	77,926	+18.6%
2000	81,019	+4.0%
2010	83,167	+2.7%
2020	83,913	+0.9%

== History ==
In the Edo period, the area of modern Ayase was part of the tenryō territory in Sagami Province controlled directly by the Tokugawa shogunate, but administered through various hatamoto. After the Meiji restoration, the area became part of Kōza District, Kanagawa Prefecture. The village of Ayase was created on April 1, 1889, through the merger of eight small hamlets, and was elevated to town status on April 1, 1945. On November 11, 1978, Ayase became the newest city in Kanagawa Prefecture.

== Government ==
Ayase has a mayor-council form of government with a directly elected mayor and a unicameral city council of 20 members. Ayase contributes one member to the Kanagawa Prefectural Assembly. In terms of national politics, the city is part of Kanagawa 13th district of the lower house of the Diet of Japan.

== Economy ==
Ayase is known for its processed meat industry, and is the leading producer of pork products in Kanagawa Prefecture.

== Education ==
Ayase has ten public elementary schools and five public middle schools operated by the city government. The city has two public high schools operated by the Kanagawa Prefectural Board of Education. There are also two private high schools.

== Transportation ==
Ayase is not connected by rail, although the tracks of the Tōkaidō Shinkansen pass through the city. The nearest train stations are Kashiwadai Station and Sagamino Station (on the Sagami Railway in neighboring Ebina) and Chōgo Station on the Odakyu Enoshima Line in Fujisawa.

Five numbered prefectural highways crisscross the city, but no national highway. The Tōmei Expressway passes through Ayase, and added the Ayase interchange in the summer of 2021. There is also a highway bus stop for the city.

== Sister cities ==
Ayase is twinned with:

- Kashiwa, Chiba, Japan, since 1967

== Notable people from Ayase, Kanagawa ==
- Ryo Iida, Japanese footballer (FC TIAMO Hirakata, Japanese Regional Leagues - Kansai Soccer League)
- Takashi Ishii - Japanese professional baseball pitcher and coach (Tohoku Rakuten Golden Eagles, Nippon Professional Baseball - Pacific League)
- Yuu Kashii - Japanese actress and model
- Yasumasa Kawasaki - Japanese footballer (SC Sagamihara, J3 League)
- Minoru Kobayashi, Japanese former football player and football manager
- Mirai Shida - Japanese actress
- Taku Suzuki - Japanese comedian and actor

== See also ==
- Naval Air Facility Atsugi
