= Ryo Iida =

Japanese footballer

Ryo Iida 飯田 涼
Personal information
- Full name: Ryo Iida
- Date of birth: 5 November 1993 (age 32)
- Place of birth: Ayase, Kanagawa, Japan
- Height: 1.64 m (5 ft 5 in)
- Position: Midfielder

Team information
- Current team: FC TIAMO Hirakata
- Number: 41

Youth career
- 2009–2011: Seiritsu Gakuen High School

Senior career*
Years	Team	Apps	(Gls)
2012–2015	Fagiano Okayama	0	(0)
2012–2015	→ Fagiano Okayama Next (loan)	62	(4)
2015	→ SC Sagamihara (loan)	19	(3)
2016–2017	SC Sagamihara	33	(3)
2018–	FC TIAMO Hirakata		
- * Club domestic league appearances and goals as of 23 February 2018

Ryo Iida (飯田 涼, Iida Ryō; born 5 November 1993 in Ayase, Kanagawa) is a Japanese footballer who plays for FC TIAMO Hirakata.

== Club statistics ==
Updated to 23 February 2018.

Club performance			League		Cup		Total	
Season	Club	League	Apps	Goals	Apps	Goals	Apps	Goals
Japan			League		Emperor's Cup		Total	
2012	Fagiano Okayama	J2 League	0	0	–		0	0
2013	Fagiano Okayama	J2 League	0	0	–		0	0
2014	Fagiano Okayama	J2 League	0	0	–		0	0
2015	Fagiano Okayama	J2 League	0	0	–		0	0
2015	SC Sagamihara	J3 League	19	3	–		19	3
2016	SC Sagamihara	J3 League	25	3	–		25	3
2017	SC Sagamihara	J3 League	8	0	–		8	0
Career total			52	6	–		52	6
