= Tsuruma Station =

Railway station in Yamato, Kanagawa Prefecture, Japan

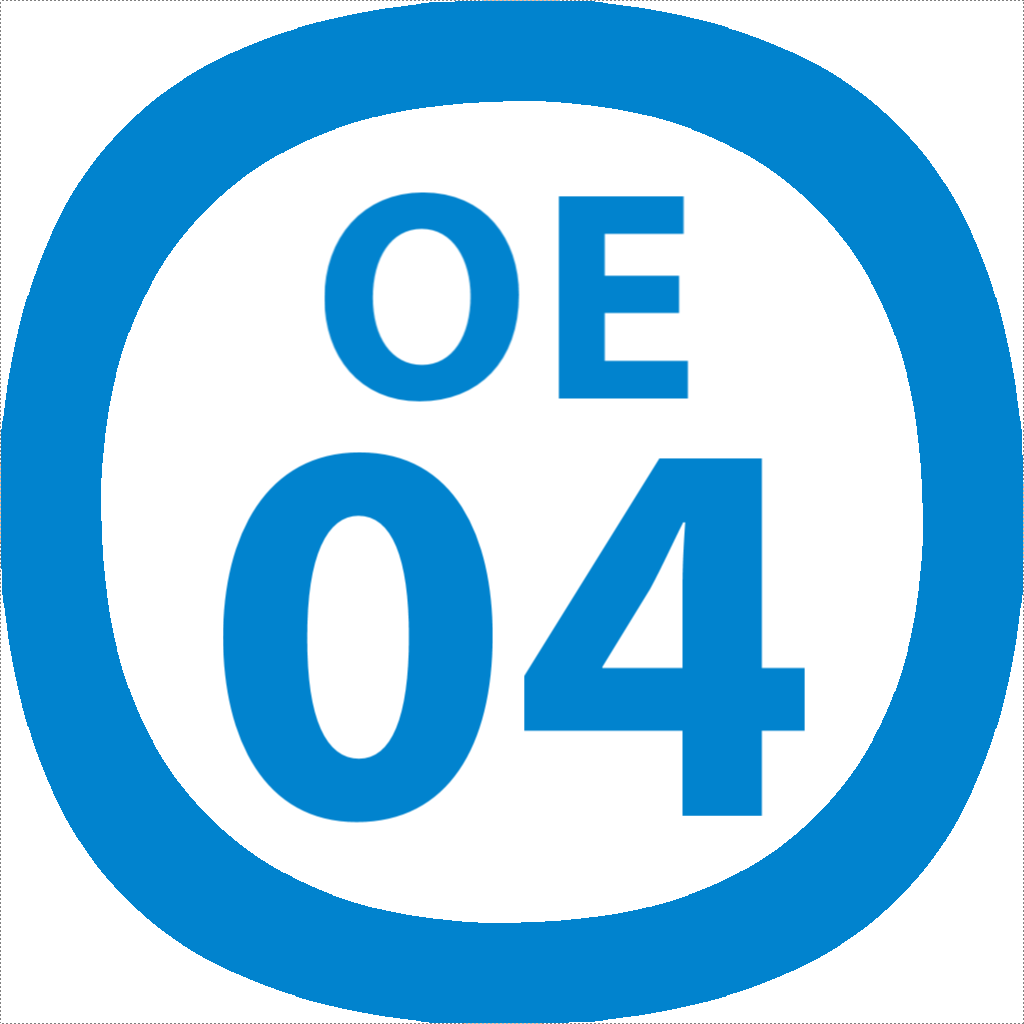
Tsuruma Station 鶴間駅

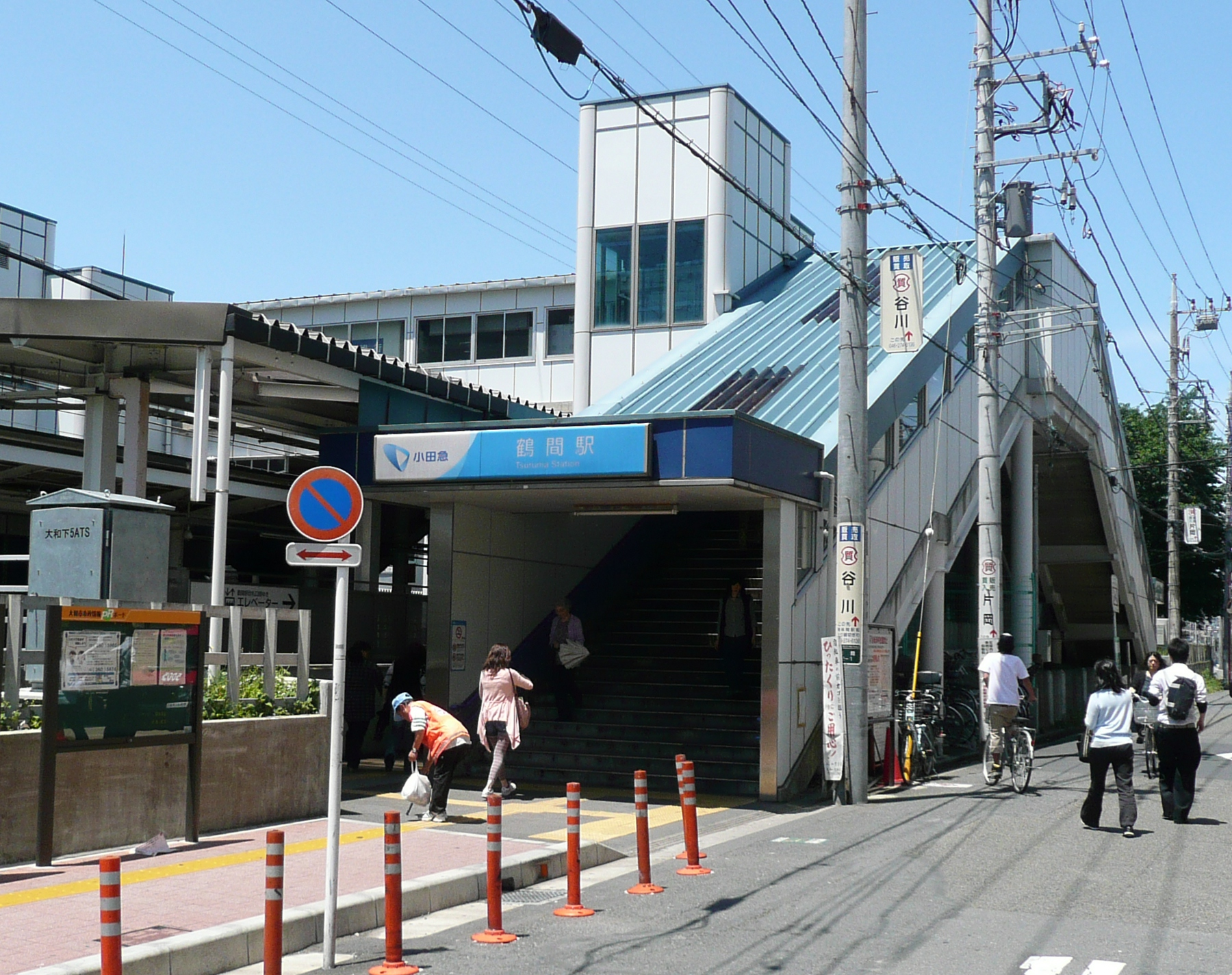
- Tsuruma Station, May 2012

General information
- Location: Nishitsuruma 1-1-1, Yamato-shi, Kanagawa-ken 242-0005; Japan
- Coordinates: 35°29′24.78″N 139°27′03.03″E
- Operator: Odakyu Electric Railway
- Line: Odakyu Enoshima Line
- Distance: 37.4 km from Shinjuku
- Platforms: 2 side platforms
- Connections: Bus terminal

Other information
- Station code: OE-4
- Website: Official website

History
- Opened: April 1, 1929

Passengers
- FY2019: 30,356 daily

Services
Preceding station	Odakyu	Following station
Yamato towards Katase-Enoshima	Enoshima Line Local	Minami-Rinkan towards Sagami-Ōno
Location
- Location within Kanagawa Prefecture Location within Japan

Tsuruma Station (鶴間駅, Tsuruma-eki) is a passenger railway station located in the city of Yamato, Kanagawa, Japan and operated by the private railway operator Odakyu Electric Railway.

== Lines ==
Tsuruma Station is served by the Odakyu Enoshima Line, with some through services to and from Shinjuku in Tokyo. It lies 37.4 kilometers from the Shinjuku terminus.

== Station layout ==
The station consists of two side platforms serving two tracks, which are connected to the station building, which is built above the platforms and tracks.

=== Platforms ===
1	■ Odakyu Enoshima Line	For Fujisawa and Katase-Enoshima
2	■ Odakyu Enoshima Line	For Sagami-Ōno and Shinjuku

== History ==
Tsuruma Station was opened on April 1, 1929. The new station building was opened on October 18, 1980.

== Passenger statistics ==
In fiscal 2019, the station was used by an average of 30,356 passengers daily.

The passenger figures for previous years are as shown below.

Fiscal year	daily average
2005	24,951
2010	26,751
2015	29,498

== Surrounding area ==
- Yamato City Hall

Yamato Municipal Hospital Yamato City Labor Welfare Hall Yamato City Health and Welfare Center Izumi no Mori, a nature park operated by the city of Yamato

== See also ==
- List of railway stations in Japan
