= St. Cecilia Women's Junior College =

Coordinates: 35°29′58″N 139°26′48″E

St. Cecilia Women’s Junior College
- 聖セシリア短期大学; Sei-sesiria tanki daigaku
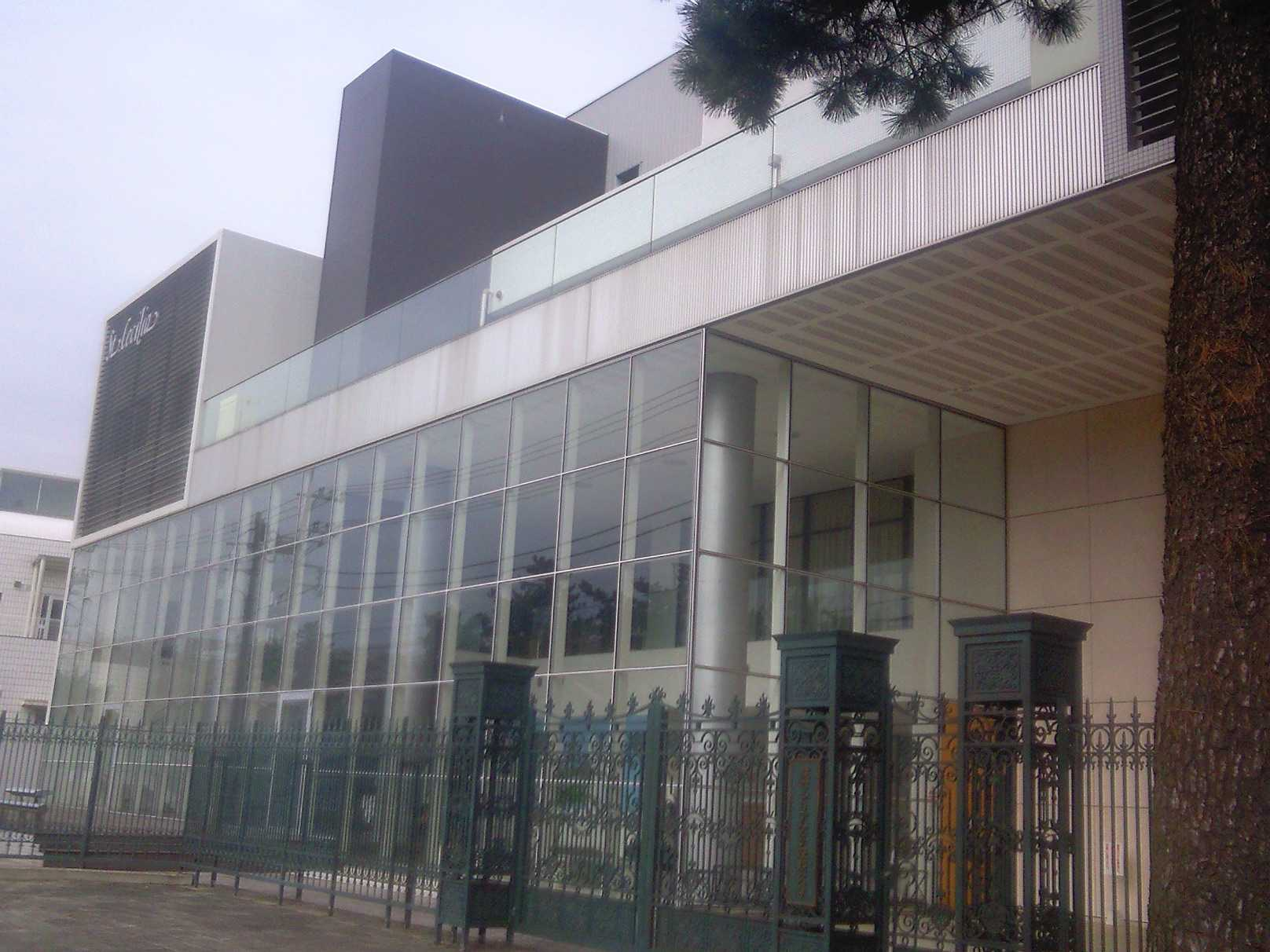
- Type: Private
- Established: 1950
- Location: Yamato, Kanagawa, Kanagawa, Japan
- Website: Official website

St. Cecilia Women’s Junior College (聖セシリア短期大学, Sei-sesiria tanki daigaku) is a private women's junior college in Yamato, Kanagawa Prefecture, Japan, established in 1950. The predecessor of the school was founded in 1945 for study of the fine arts, and later expanded to include children's care and social studies. The school is affiliated with the Roman Catholic Church. Its present name was adopted in 2004. It permanently closed on 08 September 2021.
