= Yamato, Kanagawa =

City in Japan

Yamato 大和市
- Special city
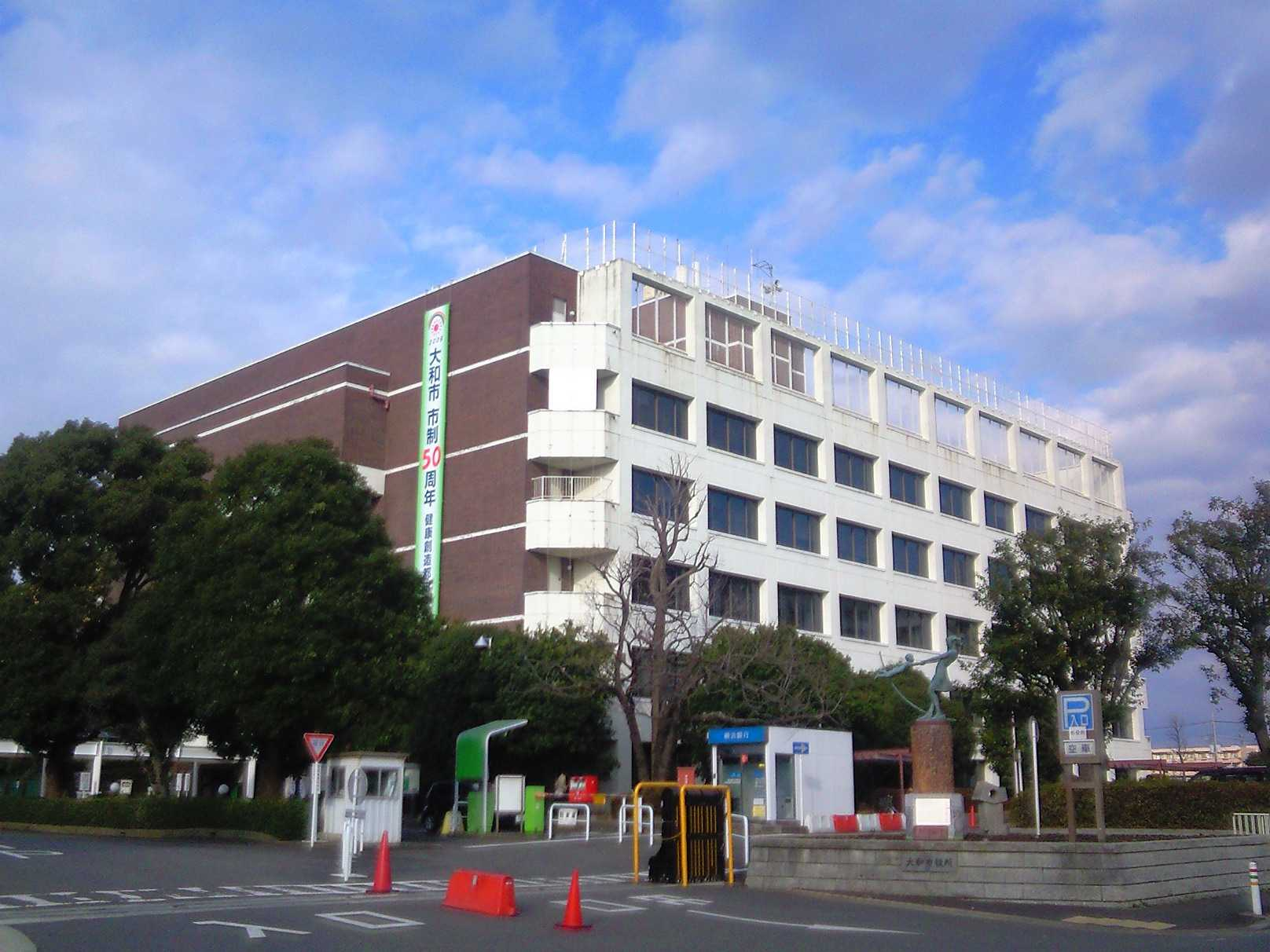
- Yamato City Hall

- Flag Seal

- Location of Yamato in Kanagawa Prefecture

- Coordinates: 35°29′N 139°27′E
- Country: Japan
- Region: Kantō
- Prefecture: Kanagawa

Government
  - Mayor: Tsutomu Koyata

Area
  - Total: 27.09 km^{2} (10.46 sq mi)

Population (October 1, 2024)
  - Total: 244,113
  - Density: 9,011/km^{2} (23,340/sq mi)
- Time zone: UTC+9 (Japan Standard Time)
- City symbols
  - Tree: Yamazakura (Prunus jamasakura)
  - Flower: Nogiku (a group of Asteraceae)
  - Bird: Azure-winged magpie
- Phone number: 046-263-1111
- Address: 1-1-1 Shimotsuruma, Yamato-shi, Kanagawa-ken 242-8601
- Website: Official website

Yamato (大和市, Yamato-shi; Japanese pronunciation: [jä́.mä̀.tò̞, jä̀.mä́.tó̞.ɕì]) is a city located in central Kanagawa Prefecture, Japan. As of 1 October 2024, the city had an estimated population of 244,113 and a population density of 9000 persons per km^{2}. The total area of the city is 27.09 km^{2} (10.46 sq mi).

== Geography ==
Yamato is located approximately 40 to 50 kilometers from central Tokyo and 20 kilometers from central Yokohama. It measures 3.22 kilometers from east-to-west by 9.79 kilometers north-to-south, and is thus long and narrow orientated from north-to-south. It is located on the Sagamino Plateau (Sagamino Plateau) and has a gently sloping terrain from north to south. The height difference is 38 meters, but there are almost no hills. The highest point in the city is 90 meters above sea level at the site of the Shimotsuruma Asama Shrine, and the lowest point is 30 meters above sea level.

=== Surrounding municipalities ===
Kanagawa Prefecture

- Ayase
- Ebina
- Fujisawa
- Sagamihara
- Yokohama
- Zama

Tokyo

- Machida, Tokyo

=== Climate ===
Yamato has a humid subtropical climate (Köppen Cfa) characterized by warm summers and cool winters with light to no snowfall. The average annual temperature in Yamato is 14.9 °C. The average annual rainfall is 1632 mm with September as the wettest month. The temperatures are highest on average in August, at around 25.7 °C, and lowest in January, at around 4.3 °C.

== Demographics ==
Per Japanese census data, the population of Yamato has grown steadily over the past 70 years.

Historical population
Year	Pop.	±%
1950	22,326	—
1960	40,975	+83.5%
1970	102,760	+150.8%
1980	167,935	+63.4%
1990	194,866	+16.0%
2000	212,761	+9.2%
2010	228,186	+7.2%
2020	239,169	+4.8%

== History ==
The area around present-day Yamato city has been inhabited for thousands of years. Archaeologists have found stone tools from the Japanese Paleolithic period and ceramic shards from the Jōmon period at numerous locations in the area. It is mentioned in the Engishiki records from the Heian period. By the Kamakura period, this area became part of the Shibuya shōen. It came under control of the Ashikaga clan in the early Muromachi period and was later part of the territories of the Later Hōjō clan from Odawara. With the start of the Edo period, the area was part of the tenryō territory in Sagami Province controlled directly by the Tokugawa shogunate, but administered through various hatamoto. Under the rule of the 5th shōgun, Tokugawa Tsunayoshi, one of these hatamoto, Sakamoto Shigeharu (1630–1693) by virtue of his position as Ōmetsuke and Jisha-bugyō, exceeded 10,000 koku in income, and thus became daimyō of the newly proclaimed Fukami Domain in October 1682. However, his revenues decreased below 10,000 koku in May 1687 and the domain was suppressed.

During the cadastral reforms after the Meiji Restoration, the area of present-day Yamato became part of Kōza District, Kanagawa Prefecture. On April 1, 1889, it was administratively divided into Shibuya Village and Tsurumi Village, which later changed its name on September 25, 1891, to Yamato Village. The area was connected by rail in 1926 via the Sagami Railway and in 1929 by the Odakyu Electric Railway, leading to an increase in population. The Imperial Japanese Navy Sagamino Air Base was established in 1940. Yamato Village became Yamato Town in 1943, and Shibuya Village became Shibuya Town in 1944. However, Shibuya was dissolved in 1955, with a portion merging with nearby Fujisawa, and the remaining portion reverting to village status. That portion was merged with Yamato in 1957, which became Yamato City in 1959. In April 2000, Yamato exceeded 200,000 in population, and was proclaimed a special city with increased local autonomy.

In 2020, the city gained international attention for outlawing walking in designated areas while using a smartphone, it was the first of its kind to do so without implementing a fine or monetary penalty.

== Government ==
Yamato has a mayor-council form of government with a directly elected mayor and a unicameral city council of 28 members. Yamato contributes four members to the Kanagawa Prefectural Assembly. In terms of national politics, the city is part of Kanagawa 13th district of the lower house of the Diet of Japan.

== Education ==
Yamato has 19 public elementary schools and nine public middle schools operated by the city government. The city has four public high schools operated by the Kanagawa Prefectural Board of Education, and the prefecture also operates two special education schools for the handicapped. The city also has one private elementary school, one private middle school and one private high school. A private junior college, the St. Cecilia Women's Junior College is located within Yamato.

== Transportation ==
=== Railway ===
Tokyu Corporation Tōkyū Den-en-toshi Line

- Chūō-Rinkan - Tsukimino

Odakyu Electric Railway – Odakyū Enoshima Line

- Chūō-Rinkan - Minami-Rinkan - Tsuruma - Yamato - Sakuragaoka - Kōza-Shibuya

Sagami Railway - Sotetsu Main Line

- Sagami-Ōtsuka - Yamato

=== Highway ===
- Tōmei Expressway
- National Route 16
- National Route 246
- National Route 467

== Sister cities ==
Yamato is twinned with:

- Minami-Uonuma, Niigata, Japan
- Taiwa, Miyagi, Japan
- Kōshū, Yamanashi, Japan

== Notable people from Yamato ==
- Jungo Fujimoto, professional football player
- Mitsuko Horie, singer, voice actress
- Ryuichi Kawamura, singer-songwriter and vocalist of the rock band Luna Sea
- Takeo Kawamura, professional baseball player
- Eiko Kawashima, singer-songwriter
- Nahomi Kawasumi, professional football player
- Masahiko Kondō, singer
- Hiroshi Nagano, singer, actor and member of the boy band V6
- Noriko Narazaki, judoka
- Shinobu Ohno, professional football player
- Minato Yoshida, professional football player
