= Yamato Station (Kanagawa) =

Railway station in Yamato, Kanagawa Prefecture, Japan

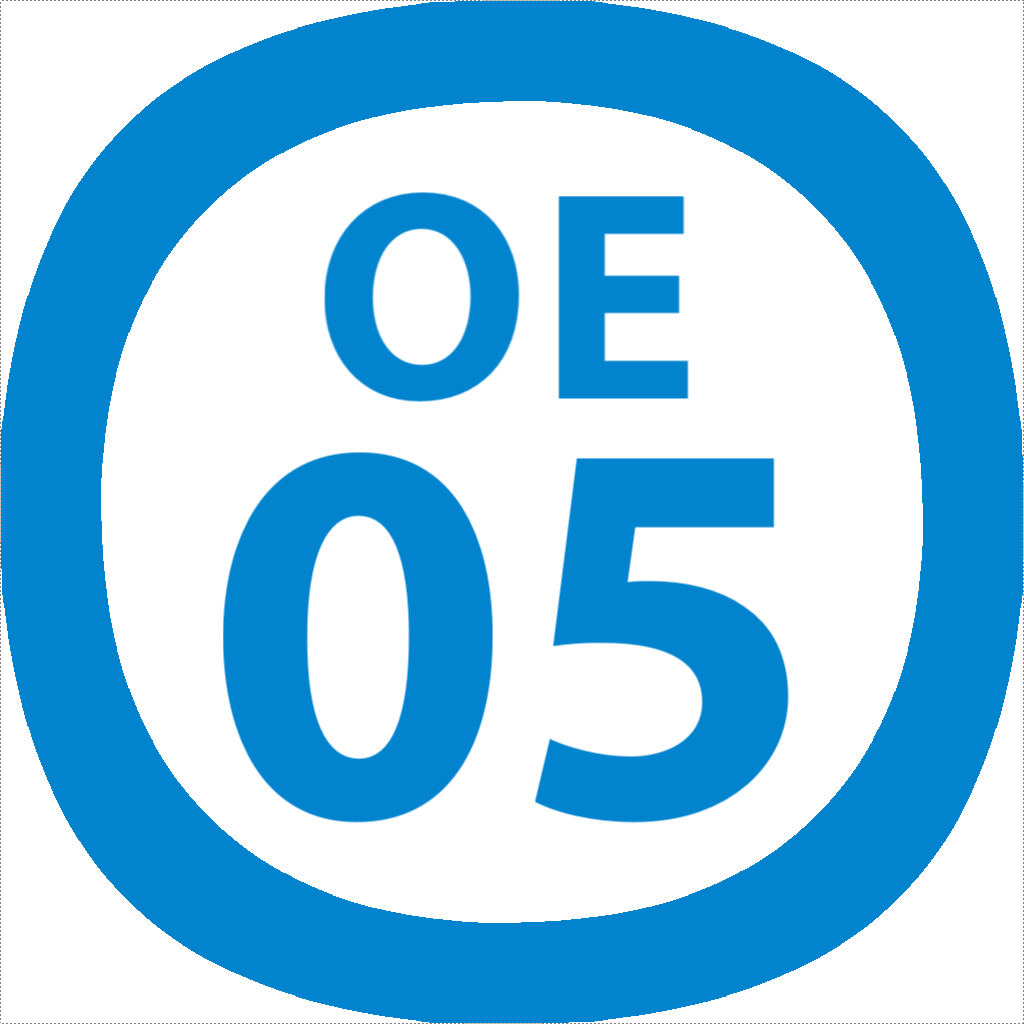
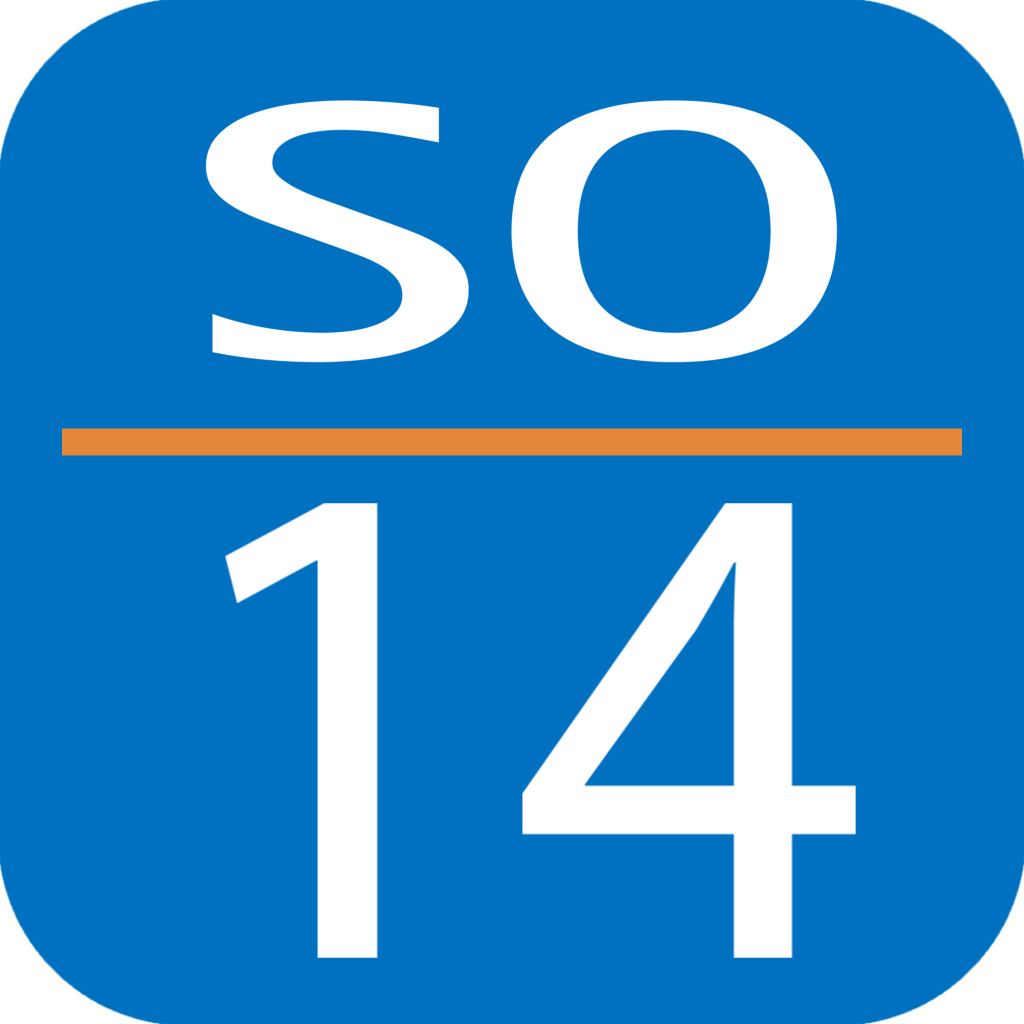
Yamato Station 大和駅

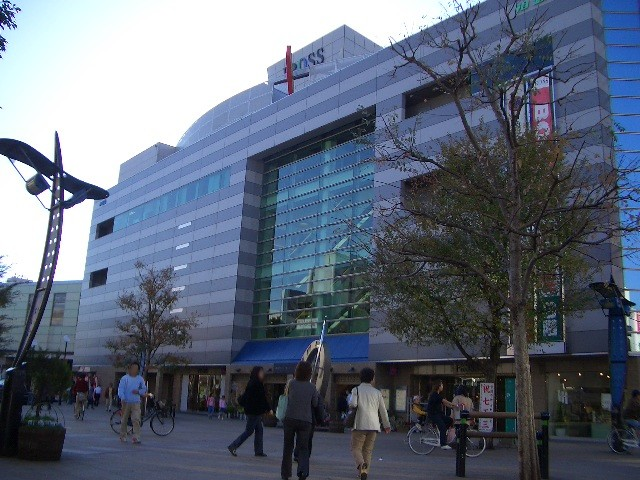
- Yamato Station

General information
- Location: 1-1-1 Yamatominami, Yamato-shi, Kanagawa-ken 242-0016; Japan
- Coordinates: 35.469697°N 139.461409°E
- Operator: Sagami Railway; Odakyu Electric Railway
- Lines: Sotetsu Main Line; Odakyu Enoshima Line
- Distance: 39.9 km from Shinjuku
- Platforms: 3 island platforms
- Connections: Bus terminal

Other information
- Station code: OE-5

History
- Opened: May 12, 1926

Passengers
- FY2019: 115,877 (Sagami Railway); 118,918 (Odakyu) daily

Services
Preceding station	Odakyu	Following station
Fujisawa towards Katase-Enoshima	Romancecar	Sagami-Ōno towards Shinjuku or Kita-Senju
Shonandai towards Fujisawa	Enoshima Line Rapid Express	Chūō-Rinkan towards Sagami-Ōno
Chōgo towards Katase-Enoshima	Enoshima Line Express	Minami-Rinkan towards Sagami-Ōno
Sakuragaoka towards Katase-Enoshima	Enoshima Line Local	Tsuruma towards Sagami-Ōno
Preceding station	Sagami Railway	Following station
Ebina Terminus	Sōtetsu Main Line Limited Express	Futamata-gawa towards Yokohama
Sagami-Ōtsuka towards Ebina	Sōtetsu Main Line Commuter Express Rapid Local	Seya towards Yokohama
Ebina Terminus	Sōtetsu–JR Link Line Limited Express	Futamata-gawa towards Shinjuku
Sagami-Ōtsuka towards Ebina	Sōtetsu–JR Link Line Local	Seya towards Shinjuku
Location
- Location within Kanagawa Prefecture Location within Japan

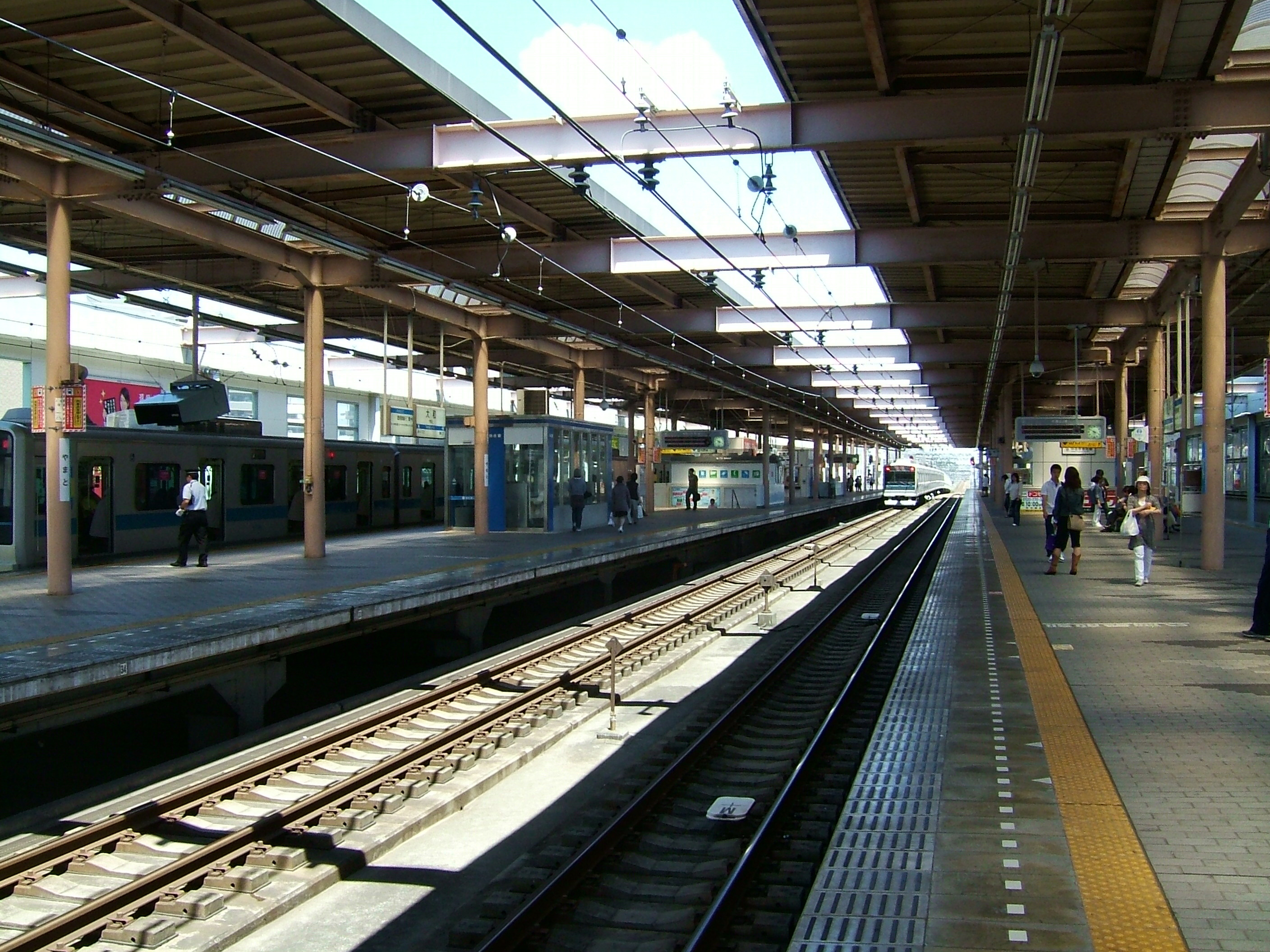
The Odakyu Line platform

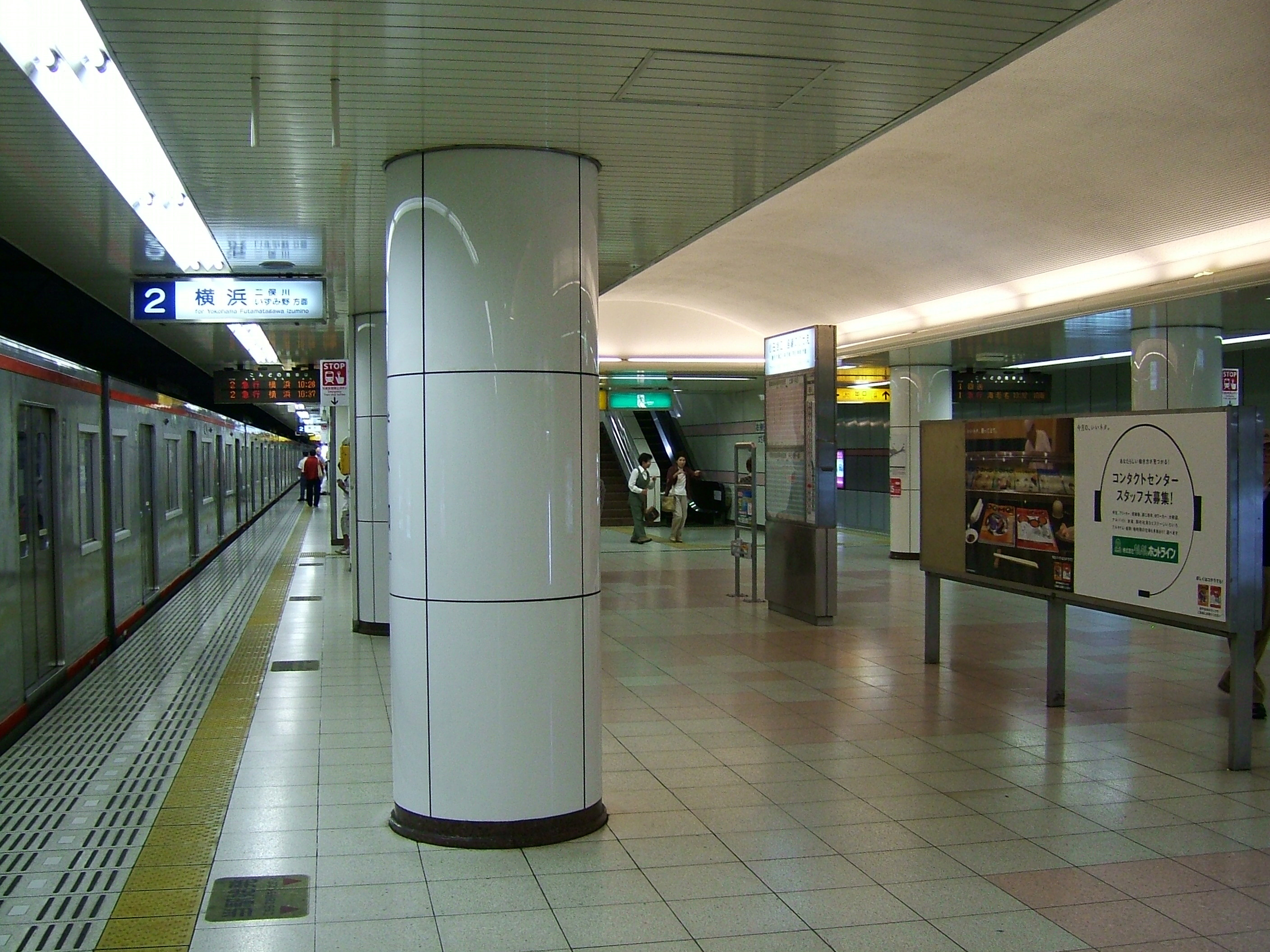
The Sagami Railway platform

Yamato Station (大和駅, Yamato-eki) is an interchange passenger railway station located in the city of Yamato, Kanagawa, Japan. It is jointly operated by the private railway operators Sagami Railway (Sotetsu) and Odakyu Electric Railway.

== Lines ==
Yamato Station is served by the Odakyu Enoshima Line, with some through services to and from Shinjuku in Tokyo. It lies 39.9 kilometers from the Shinjuku terminus. The station is also served by the Sagami Railway Main Line and is 14.7 kilometers from the terminus of that line at Yokohama.

- Odakyu Enoshima Line

== Station layout ==
The station is a joint use station. The north exit is operated by the Sagami Railway and the south exit is operated by the Odakyu Railway, although passengers can use either exit regardless of what line they are using. The Odakyu Railway station consists of two island platforms connected by a footbridge to the station building. The station building is elevated, and located above the platforms and tracks. The Sagami Railway station has one island platform, located underground.

=== Platforms ===
==== Odakyu platforms ====
1-2	■ Odakyu Enoshima Line	for Fujisawa and Katase-Enoshima
3-4	■ Odakyu Enoshima Line	for Sagami-Ōno and Shinjuku

==== Sotetsu platforms ====
1	■ Sagami Railway Main Line	for Ebina
2	■ Sagami Railway Main Line	for Futamata-gawa, Yokohama and Shin-Yokohama

== History ==
Yamato Station opened on May 12, 1926 as a station on the Jintsu Railway. The Odakyu Station was opened on April 1, 1929 slightly to the west of the existing station, and was named Nishi-Yamato Station (西大和駅, Nishi-Yamato-eki). On June 1, 1944, Yamato Station was relocated to become adjacent to Nishi-Yamato Station, with the new joint station taking the name Yamato Station. The station building was completely reconstructed in a multiyear project beginning from 1986. In 1993, the tracks and platform of the Sagami Railway were relocated to a subway level, which created room for expansion of the Odakyu station to two platforms in 1996.

== Passenger statistics ==
In fiscal 2019, the Odakyu station was used by an average of 118,918 passengers daily. During the same period, the Sotetsu portion of the station was used by an average of 115,877 passengers daily.

The passenger figures for previous years are as shown below.

Fiscal year	daily average Odakyu	daily average Sotetsu
2005	102,765	104,302
2010	111,481	109,762
2015	116,042	112,126

== Surrounding area ==
- Yamato Tax Office
- Yamato Public Employment Security Office
- Kanagawa Prefecture Yamato Health and Welfare Office (Health Center)
- Kanagawa Yamato Prefectural Tax Office
- Yamato Tokushukai Hospital
- Yamato City Mitsuoka Junior High School
- Izumi no Mori, a nature park operated by the city of Yamato.

== See also ==
- List of railway stations in Japan
