= Susumu Sakurai =

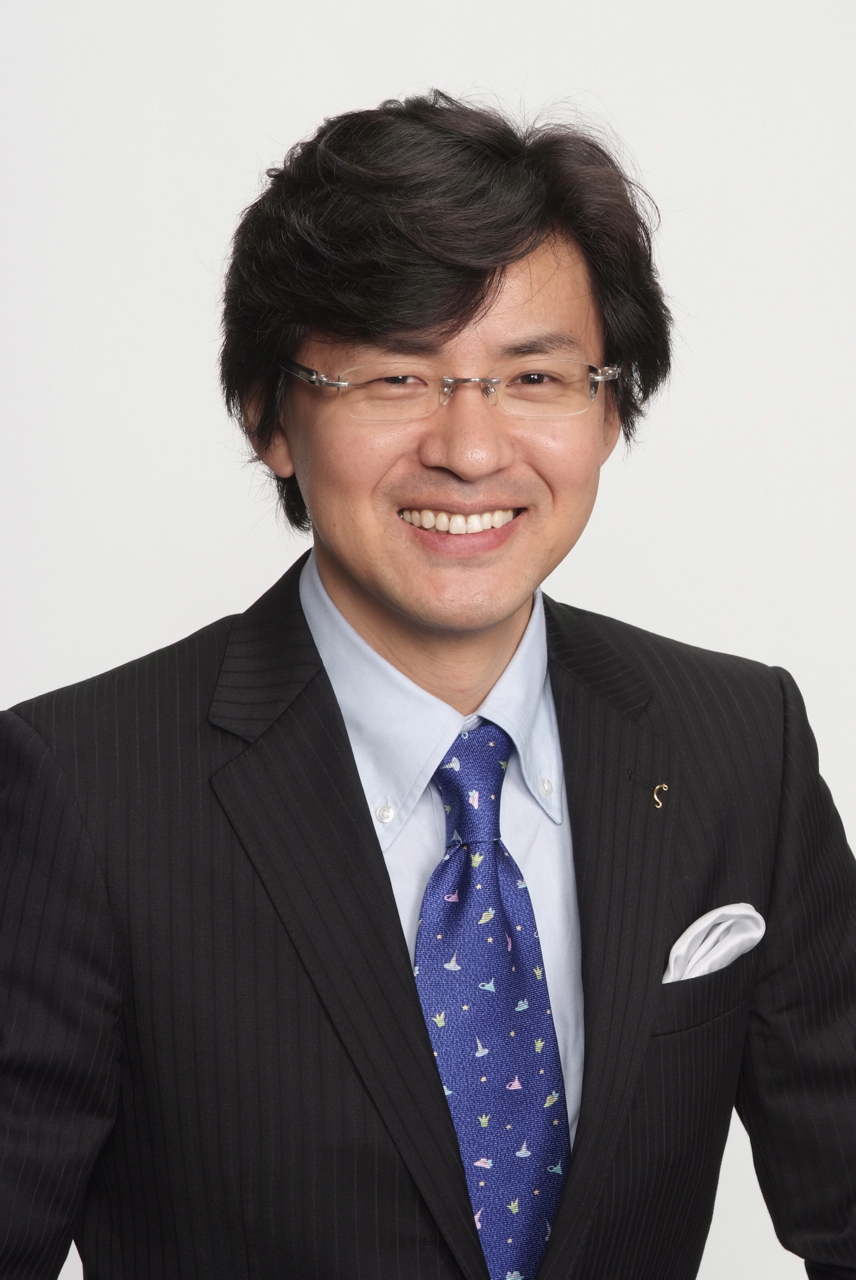
Image of Sakurai

Susumu Sakurai (born 1968) is a Japanese scientist and science navigator. He was born in Yamagata Prefecture. He is the president of sakurAi Science Factory Inc.

== Career ==
Susumu Sakurai taught mathematics and physics at a preparatory school while still a student, and in 2000, he began lecturing on mathematics under the name of Science Navigator. He has been a fellow of the Center for the Study of World Civilizations at Tokyo Institute of Technology. Author of the high school mathematics textbook "Math Utilization" (Keirinkan).

== Education ==
- B.S. in mathematics, Tokyo Institute of Technology
- Ph.D. in Value Systems, Graduate School of Decision Science and Technology, Tokyo Institute of Technology
- Part-time lecturer at Shonan Institute of Technology
- Fellow, Center for the Study of World Civilizations, Tokyo Institute of Technology
- Part-time lecturer at the Japan Academy of Moving Images
- Part-time lecturer at Nihon University College of Art
- Part-time Lecturer, Graduate School of Tokyo University of Science

== Positions ==
Member of the Central Judging Committee, Rimse Competition for Free Research Works in Arithmetic and Mathematics, The Research Institute for Science and Mathematics Education

Director, Central Institute for Educational Research

Cherry Goodwill Ambassador, Higashine City, Yamagata Prefecture

Member of Research Evaluation Committee, Geospatial Information Authority of Japan (FY2016)
