= Tsujido Seaside Park =

Park in Fujisawa, Kanagawa, Japan

Coordinates: 35°19′15″N 139°27′00″E

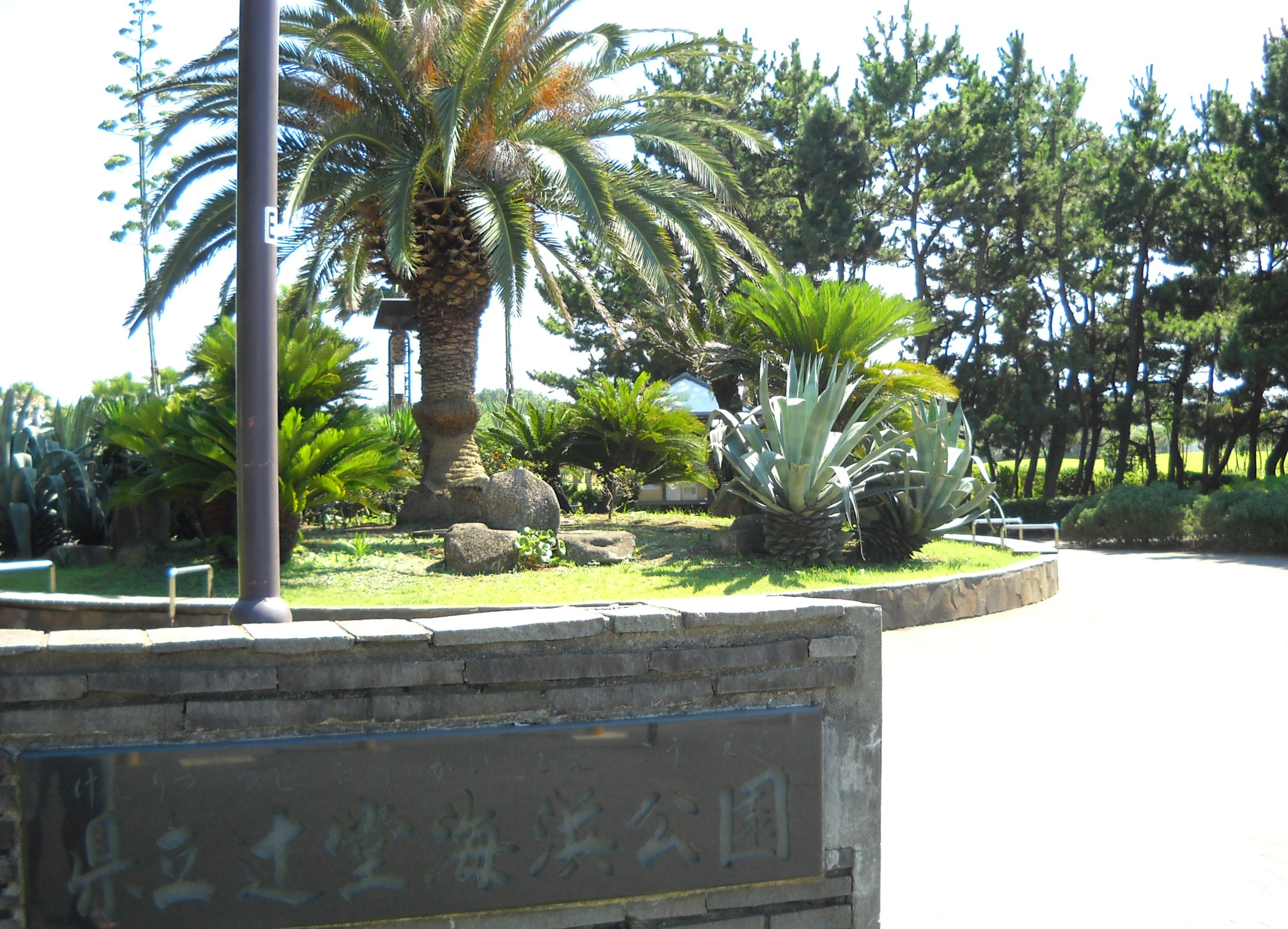
The north entrance to Tsujido Seaside Park, Tsujido Kaigan, Kanagawa, Japan

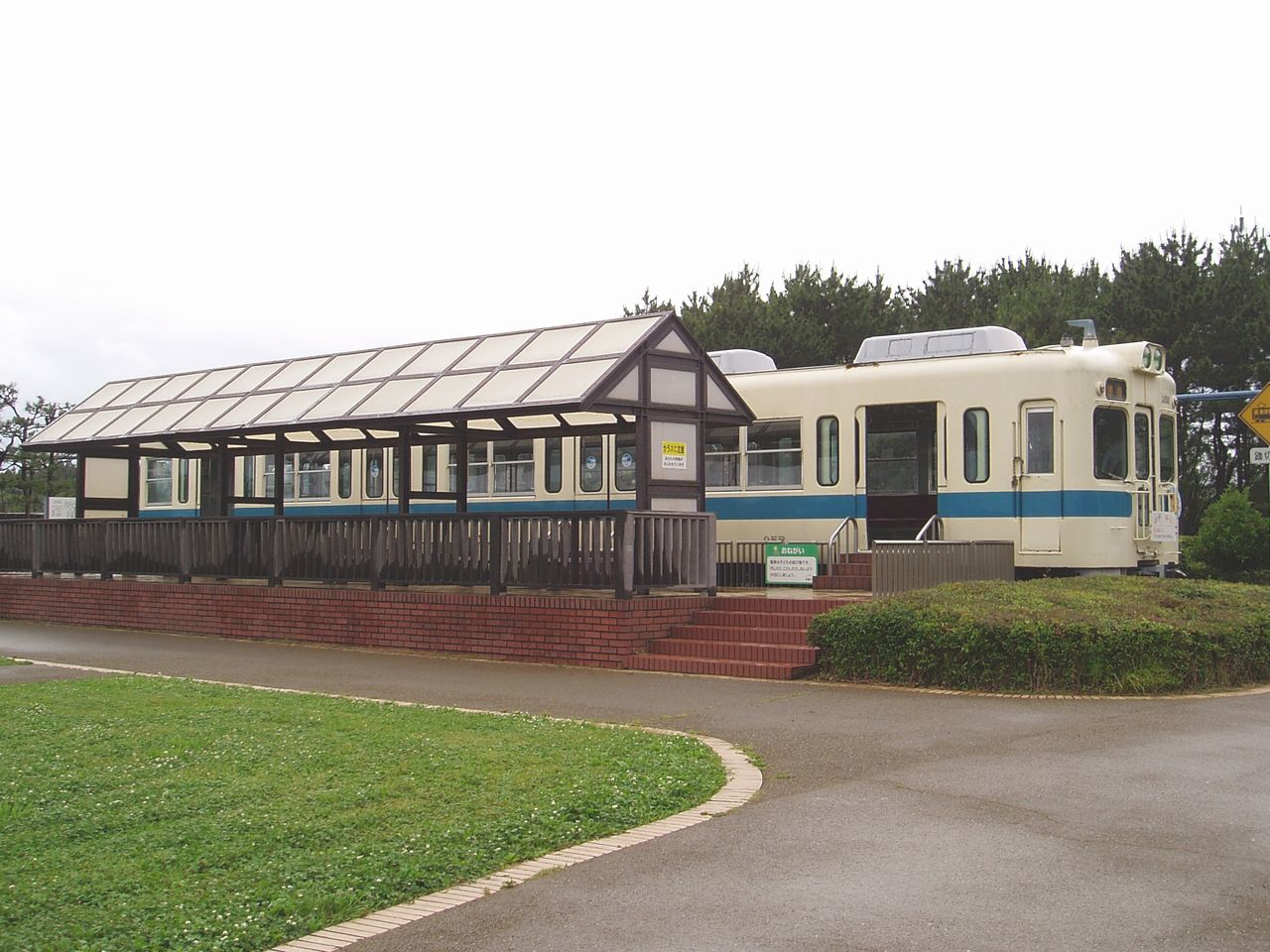
Odakyu Electric Railway's car, Kuha2658, preserved in the park

Tshujido Seaside Park (Japanese: 辻堂海浜公園) is a 19.9-hectare Kanagawa prefectural city park, located on the west coast of Tsujido, Fujisawa City, Kanagawa, Japan. It has been selected as one of the 50 best parks in Kanagawa.

== History ==
The park opened on the site of the former Tsujido Exercise Area of the Japanese Imperial Navy, and later the United States Navy in Japan.

- March 7, 1971 - The opening ceremonies were held
- April 1, 1971 - Officially opened
- 1999 - Renovation completed

== Main facilities ==
- Jumbo swimming pool (charged)
- Jogging course (free)

Jogging is a popular sport in this park. Parkrun (5 km) starts every Saturday at 8:00 am, from the "Southern Sail" monument.

- Transportation Exhibition Hall (charged)
- Traffic Education Park for Children
  - Sky Cycle (charged)
  - Bicycle riding & Kart racing (free)
  - A pedestrian traffic light with the shape of a human Astro Boy is installed. [3]
- Odakyu Electric Railway's 2600 type train car (Kuha 2658)
- Parking areas - 782 cars (charged)

== Transportation ==
From the south exit of Tsujido Station on the JR Tokaido Line, take the "Tsuji 03" bus bound for Tsujido Housing Complex via Takasago / Tsujido West Coast and get off at "Tsujido Saeaside Park Entrance". From the south exit of Tsujido Station, take the bus bound for Kugenuma Garage via Shoyo Junior High School and get off at Tsujido Seaside Park.

== See also ==
- Kanagawa Prefecture's Visitors attractions and places of interest
