= Zengyō Station =

Railway station in Fujisawa, Kanagawa Prefecture, Japan

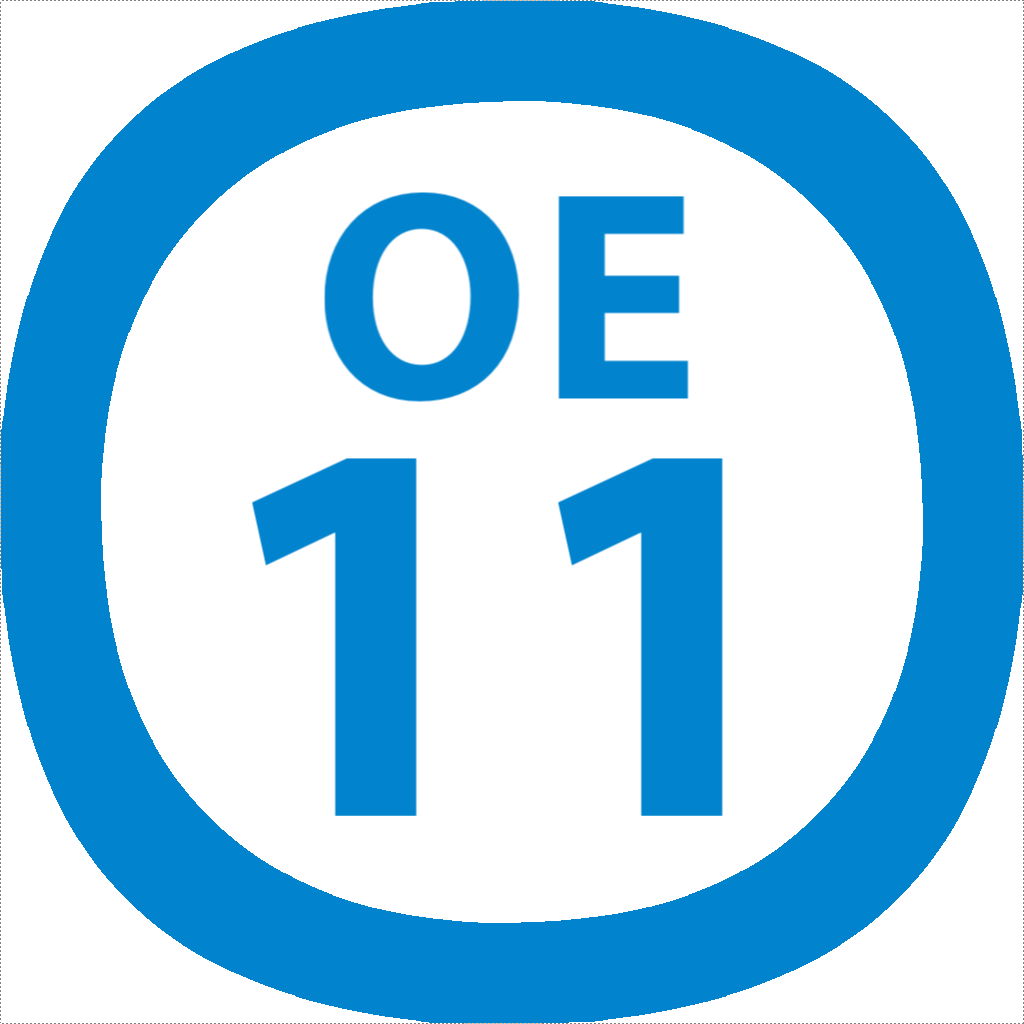
Zengyō Station 善行駅

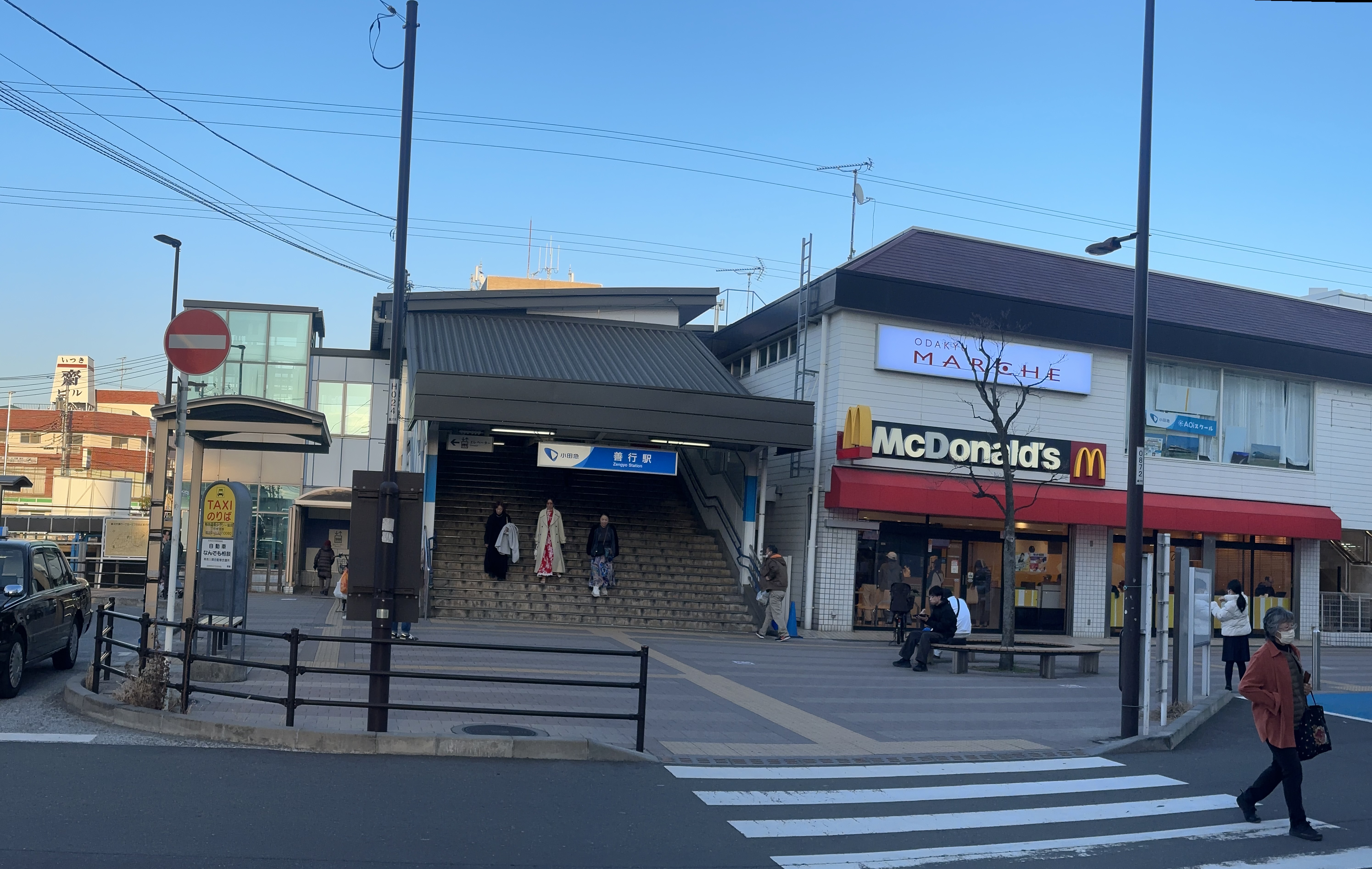
- Zengyō Station, West Exit, 2026

General information
- Location: Zengyō 1-27-4, Fujisawa-shi, Kanagawa-ken 251-0871; Japan
- Coordinates: 35°21′46″N 139°28′23.5″E
- Operator: Odakyu Electric Railway
- Line: Odakyu Enoshima Line
- Distance: 42.0 km from Shinjuku
- Platforms: 2 side platforms
- Connections: Bus terminal

Other information
- Station code: OE-11
- Website: Official website

History
- Opened: October 1, 1960

Passengers
- FY2019: 27,011 daily

Services
Preceding station	Odakyu	Following station
Fujisawa-Hommachi towards Katase-Enoshima	Enoshima Line Local	Mutsuai-Nichidaimae towards Sagami-Ōno
Location
- Location within Kanagawa Prefecture Location within Japan

Zengyō Station (善行駅, Zengyō-eki) is a passenger railway station located in the city of Fujisawa, Kanagawa, Japan and operated by the private railway operator Odakyu Electric Railway.

== Lines ==
Zengyō Station is served by the Odakyu Enoshima Line, with some through services to and from Shinjuku in Tokyo. It lies 52.0 kilometers from the Shinjuku terminus.

== Station layout ==
The station consists of two opposed side platforms serving two tracks, which are connected to the station building by a footbridge. The tunnels visible from the platform towards Fujisawa Station are the only tunnels on the Enoshima Line.

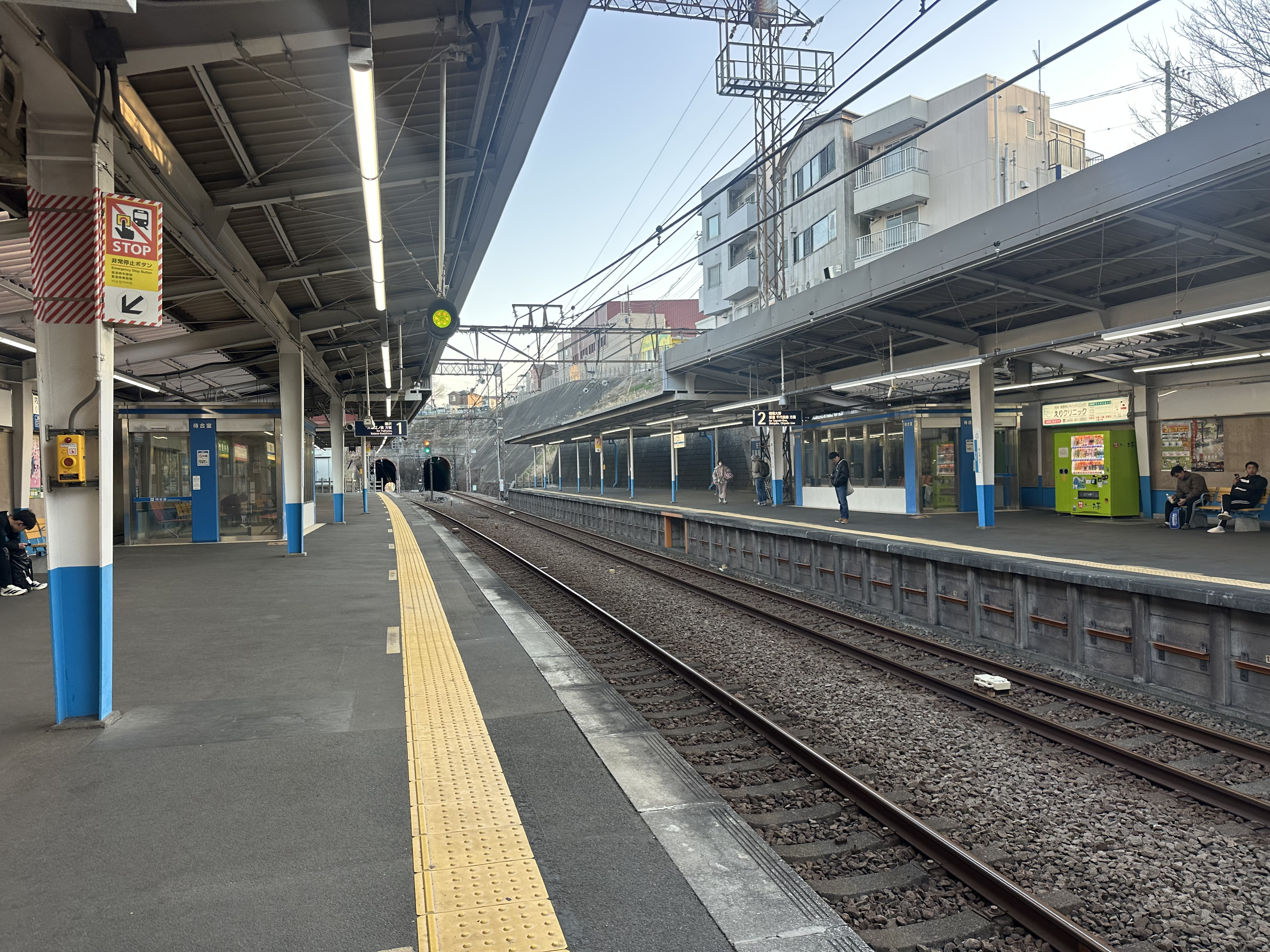

=== Platforms ===
1	■ Odakyu Enoshima Line	For Fujisawa and Katase-Enoshima
2	■ Odakyu Enoshima Line	For Sagami-Ōno and Shinjuku

== History ==
Zengyō Station was opened on October 1, 1960 with the development of a large housing district with the same name nearby.

== Passenger statistics ==
In fiscal 2019, the station was used by an average of 27,011 passengers daily.

The passenger figures for previous years are as shown below.

Fiscal year	daily average
2005	26,354
2010	26,714
2015	27,176

== Surrounding area ==
- Kanagawa Prefectural Sports Center

== See also ==
- List of railway stations in Japan
