= Masahiko Kumagai =

Japanese footballer

Masahiko Kumagai 熊谷 雅彦
Personal information
- Full name: Masahiko Kumagai
- Date of birth: November 23, 1975 (age 50)
- Place of birth: Fujisawa, Kanagawa, Japan
- Height: 1.78 m (5 ft 10 in)
- Position: Midfielder

Youth career
- 1991–1993: Fujisawa Nishi High School
- 1994–1997: Chuo University

Senior career*
Years	Team	Apps	(Gls)
1998–1999	Kashiwa Reysol	1	(0)
2000–2005	Sagawa Express Tokyo		
2005–2008	Roasso Kumamoto	74	(8)
Total		75	(8)
Medal record
Kashiwa Reysol
Winner	J.League Cup	1999
- * Club domestic league appearances and goals

Masahiko Kumagai (熊谷 雅彦, Kumagai Masahiko; born November 23, 1975) is a former Japanese football player.

== Playing career ==
Kumagai was born in Fujisawa on November 23, 1975. After graduating from Chuo University, he joined the J1 League club Kashiwa Reysol in 1998. Although he debuted as a defensive midfielder in 1999, he did not play much. In 2000, he moved to the Regional Leagues club Sagawa Express Tokyo. He played as a regular player and the club was promoted to the Japan Football League (JFL) in 2001. He was selected as one of the Best Eleven in 2001 and 2002. In June 2005, he moved to the Regional Leagues club Rosso Kumamoto (later Roasso Kumamoto). He played as a regular player and the club was promoted to JFL in 2006 and the J2 League in 2008. However he did not play in 2008 and retired at the end of the 2008 season.

== Club statistics ==
Club performance			League		Cup		League Cup		Total	
Season	Club	League	Apps	Goals	Apps	Goals	Apps	Goals	Apps	Goals
Japan			League		Emperor's Cup		J.League Cup		Total	
1998	Kashiwa Reysol	J1 League	0	0	0	0	0	0	0	0
1999	Kashiwa Reysol	J1 League	1	0	0	0	3	0	4	0
2000	Sagawa Express Tokyo	Regional Leagues			-		-			
2001	Sagawa Express Tokyo	Football League	30	4	4	3	-		34	7
2002	Sagawa Express Tokyo	Football League	17	6	-		-		17	6
2003	Sagawa Express Tokyo	Football League	30	2	3	0	-		33	2
2004	Sagawa Express Tokyo	Football League	29	4	3	0	-		32	4
2005	Sagawa Express Tokyo	Football League	11	1	0	0	-		11	1
2005	Rosso Kumamoto	Regional Leagues	11	0	1	0	-		12	0
2006	Rosso Kumamoto	Football League	32	6	3	0	-		35	6
2007	Rosso Kumamoto	Football League	25	2	1	0	-		26	2
2008	Roasso Kumamoto	J2 League	6	0	0	0	-		6	0
Total			192	25	15	3	3	0	210	28
