= Fujisawa =

Fujisawa 藤沢市
- City
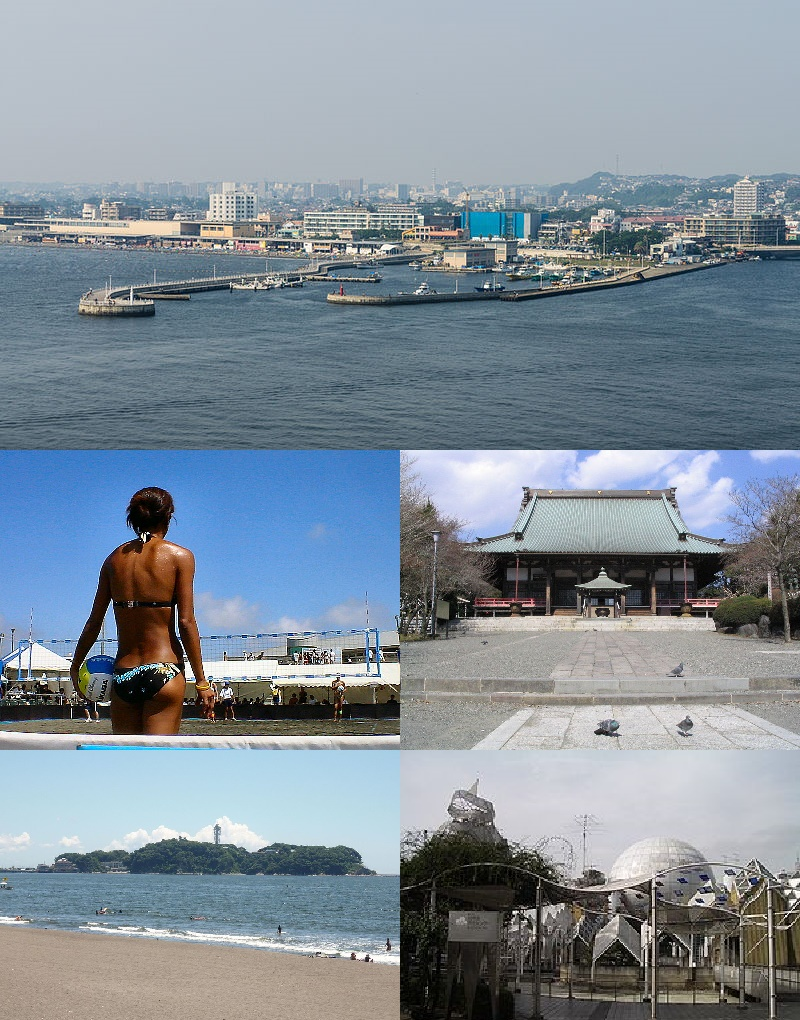
- Fujisawa seen from Enoshima Beach Volleyball Japan / Yugyo-ji Kugenuma Beach / Enoshima Shonandai Cultural Center

- Flag Seal

- Location of Fujisawa in Kanagawa Prefecture

- Coordinates: 35°21′N 139°28′E
- Country: Japan
- Region: Kantō
- Prefecture: Kanagawa

Area
  - Total: 69.57 km^{2} (26.86 sq mi)

Population (June 1, 2021)
  - Total: 439,728
  - Density: 6,321/km^{2} (16,370/sq mi)
- Time zone: UTC+9 (Japan Standard Time)
- Phone number: 0466-25-1111
- Address: 1 Asahi-cho, Fujisawa-shi, Kanagawa-ken 251-8601
- Climate: Cfa
- Website: Official website
- Symbols
- Bird: Common kingfisher
- Flower: Wisteria
- Tree: Japanese black pine

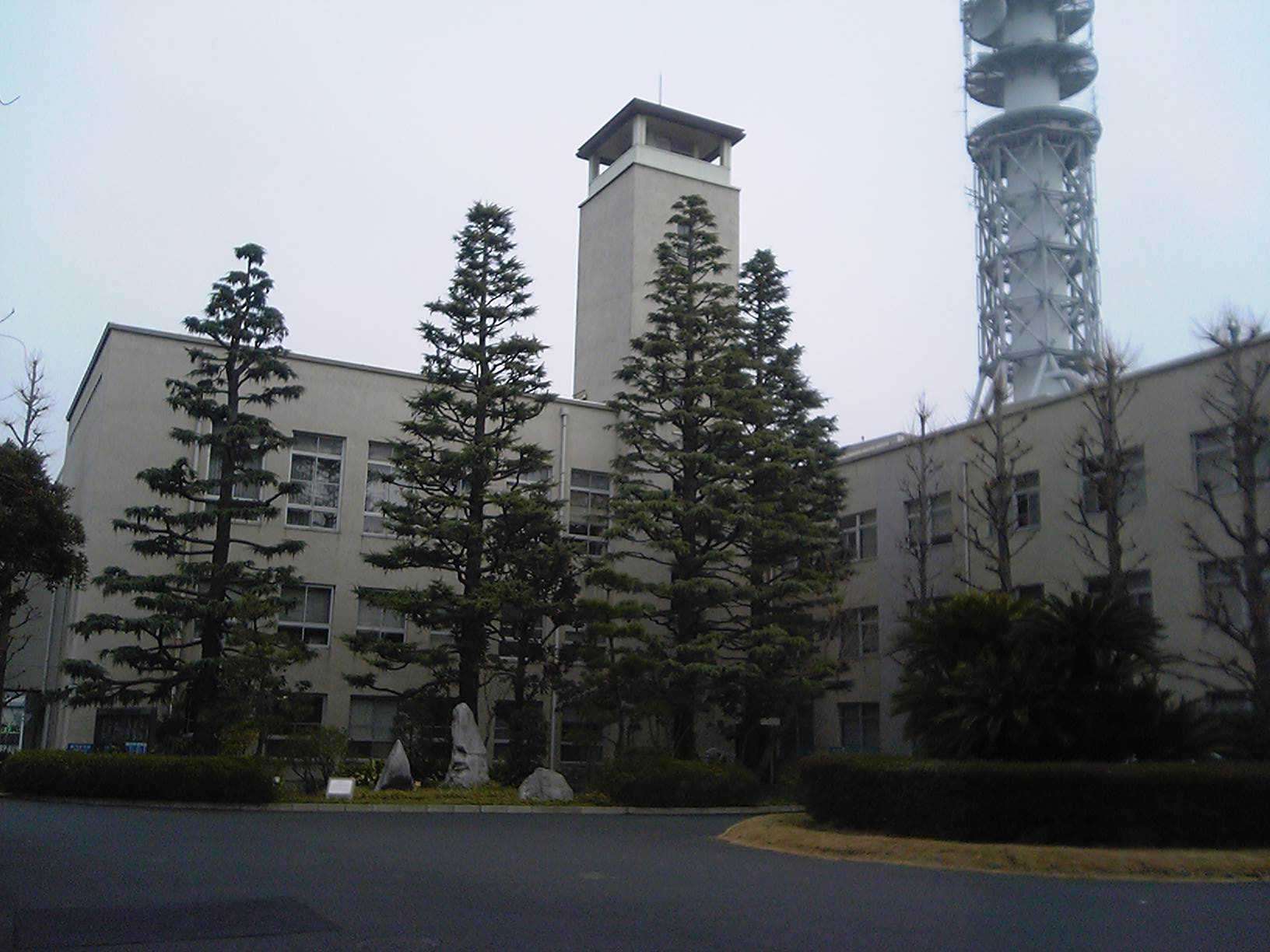
Fujisawa City Hall

Fujisawa (藤沢市, Fujisawa-shi) is a city in Kanagawa Prefecture, Japan. As of 1 June 2021, the city had an estimated population of 439,728 and a population density of 6300 persons per km^{2}. The total area of the city is 69.57 square kilometres (26.86 sq mi).

== Geography ==
Fujisawa is in the south-central part of Kanagawa Prefecture. It faces Sagami Bay of the Pacific Ocean. The northern part of the city is on the Sagamino plateau while the southern part is abutted on the Shonan Beach.

Fujisawa has three major topographical features: the island of Enoshima to the south connected to the Katase shoreline area by a road bridge, and two rivers, the Hikiji and the Sakai, which run north-south. The Hikiji can be traced from an area designated as a nature reserve park in the city of Yamato and flows directly along the boundary of the joint US Navy and Japan Maritime Self-Defense Force Atsugi Naval Air Base and the United States Army Camp Zama. The Sakai runs directly from the mountains between Machida and Hachiōji, and for quite some distance forms the border between the Tokyo Metropolitan Area and Kanagawa Prefecture. From Machida city centre, the river can be directly followed by a foot and cycle path to Fujisawa city centre, a distance of approximately 35 km (22 mi). Another cycle path runs along the Shonan Coastal path, from the Sagami River, in Hiratsuka, to Enoshima Bridge in Fujisawa.

=== Surrounding municipalities ===
Kanagawa Prefecture

- Ayase
- Chigasaki
- Ebina
- Kamakura
- Samukawa
- Yamato
- Yokohama

=== Climate ===
Fujisawa has a humid subtropical climate (Köppen Cfa) characterized by warm summers and cool winters with light to no snowfall. The average annual temperature in Fujisawa is 15.3 °C. The average annual rainfall is 1872 mm with September as the wettest month. The temperatures are highest on average in August, at around 25.7 °C, and lowest in January, at around 5.4 °C.

Climate data for Tsujido, Fujisawa (1992−2020 normals, extremes 1992−present)
Month	Jan	Feb	Mar	Apr	May	Jun	Jul	Aug	Sep	Oct	Nov	Dec	Year
Record high °C (°F)	19.7 (67.5)	22.1 (71.8)	23.4 (74.1)	27.2 (81.0)	30.6 (87.1)	32.1 (89.8)	36.2 (97.2)	37.0 (98.6)	36.5 (97.7)	31.2 (88.2)	25.2 (77.4)	22.8 (73.0)	36.9 (98.4)
Mean daily maximum °C (°F)	10.8 (51.4)	11.4 (52.5)	14.2 (57.6)	18.5 (65.3)	22.4 (72.3)	24.9 (76.8)	28.2 (82.8)	30.3 (86.5)	27.6 (81.7)	22.7 (72.9)	17.8 (64.0)	13.2 (55.8)	20.2 (68.3)
Daily mean °C (°F)	6.0 (42.8)	6.8 (44.2)	9.8 (49.6)	14.4 (57.9)	18.6 (65.5)	21.6 (70.9)	25.1 (77.2)	26.9 (80.4)	23.9 (75.0)	18.7 (65.7)	13.4 (56.1)	8.5 (47.3)	16.1 (61.1)
Mean daily minimum °C (°F)	1.5 (34.7)	2.2 (36.0)	5.4 (41.7)	10.2 (50.4)	15.1 (59.2)	18.9 (66.0)	22.8 (73.0)	24.3 (75.7)	20.8 (69.4)	15.3 (59.5)	9.5 (49.1)	4.1 (39.4)	12.5 (54.5)
Record low °C (°F)	−4.3 (24.3)	−5.0 (23.0)	−2.1 (28.2)	−0.2 (31.6)	7.0 (44.6)	12.3 (54.1)	16.7 (62.1)	17.7 (63.9)	12.2 (54.0)	7.4 (45.3)	0.8 (33.4)	−3.5 (25.7)	−5.0 (23.0)
Average precipitation mm (inches)	60.8 (2.39)	61.1 (2.41)	132.6 (5.22)	134.4 (5.29)	148.1 (5.83)	171.9 (6.77)	159.6 (6.28)	120.6 (4.75)	197.3 (7.77)	191.1 (7.52)	97.7 (3.85)	63.7 (2.51)	1,529.5 (60.22)
Average precipitation days (≥ 1.0 mm)	5.6	5.9	10.1	9.4	10.2	11.9	10.3	6.8	10.8	10.2	8.0	5.8	105
Mean monthly sunshine hours	202.5	177.7	181.3	182.6	187.5	133.5	171.3	214.7	147.1	144.2	160.8	192.3	2,096.9
Source: Japan Meteorological Agency

== Demographics ==
Per Japanese census data, the population of Fujisawa has grown steadily over the past 70 years.

Historical population
Year	Pop.	±%
1950	96,880	—
1960	124,601	+28.6%
1970	228,789	+83.6%
1980	300,248	+31.2%
1990	350,330	+16.7%
2000	379,185	+8.2%
2010	409,657	+8.0%
2020	436,905	+6.7%

== History ==
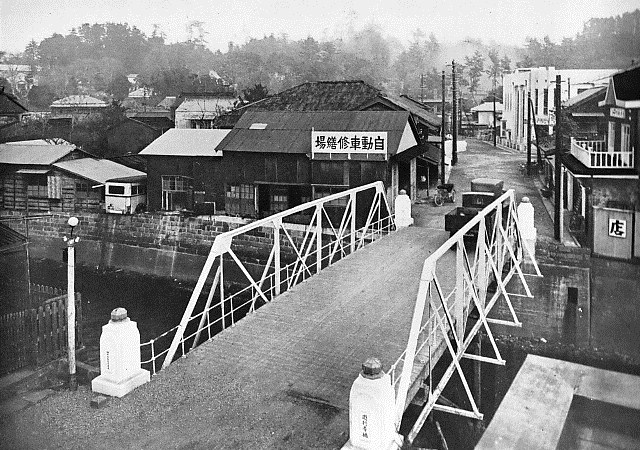
Fujisawa in 1933

The area around present-day Fujisawa City has been inhabited for thousands of years. Archaeologists have found stone tools and shell middens from the Japanese Paleolithic period, ceramic shards from the Jōmon period, and graves from the Kofun period at numerous locations. The area is mentioned in the Nara period Nihon Shoki chronicles. By the Heian period, central Sagami Province was divided into shōen controlled by the Muroaoka, Oe, and other local warlords. During the Kamakura period, Fujisawa was the setting for a number of battles to overthrow the Kamakura shogunate as mentioned in the late 14th century Taiheiki. During the Muromachi period, Fujisawa developed around Yugyo-ji, a Buddhist temple, which was established in 1325.

With the Edo period, Fujisawa prospered as Fujisawa-shuku, a post station on the Tōkaidō highway connecting Edo with Kyoto. Shōgun Tokugawa Ieyasu built a palace in Fujisawa as a rest stop between Edo and Sunpu.

Following the Meiji Restoration, the area was divided into villages in Kōza District and Kamakura District within Kanagawa Prefecture. The Kōza District office was located in Fujisawa from 1878. The area developed rapidly after the opening of Fujisawa Station of Tōkaidō Main Line in 1887.

During the cadastral reform of April 1, 1889, Fujisawa-Ōsaka Town (in Kōza District) and Fujisawa-Ōtomi Town (in Kamakura District) were created through the merger of local hamlets. Emperor Meiji visited Fujisawa in 1891 to watch military maneuvers. The IJA 49th Infantry Regiment under the IJA 1st Division was stationed in Fujisawa from 1907. During the same year, Fujisawa-Ōsaka Town absorbed Fujisawa-Ōtomi Town and expanded further in 1908 by annexing the neighboring villages of Kugenuma and Meiji (both from Kamakura District), renaming itself Fujisawa Town.

The 1923 Great Kantō earthquake caused severe damage to Fujisawa, with some 4,000 houses destroyed. An Imperial Japanese Navy Artillery School was established in Tsujido in 1926.

The town of Fujisawa was elevated to city status on October 1, 1940. Fujisawa expanded by annexing the village of Muraoka in 1941, the village of Mutsuai in 1942, the town of Katase in 1947, and the villages of Goshomi, Chogo, Takakura and parts of Koide (hamlet of Endo) in 1955. Fujisawa hosted the yachting events of the 1964 Summer Olympics.

These improved transport links, such as the Yokohama Subway line and express train services on the Odakyu line, and people believe it has made Fujisawa an increasingly attractive and cost-effective commuter suburb for Tokyo and Yokohama.

== Government ==
Fujisawa has a mayor-council form of government with a directly elected mayor and a unicameral city council of 36 members. Fujisawa contributes five members to the Kanagawa Prefectural Assembly. In terms of national politics, the city is part of Kanagawa 12th district of the lower house of the Diet of Japan.

== Economy ==
Fujisawa has a mixed economy with a strong industrial base. Isuzu retains a large truck factory at Tsuchidana. Kobe Steel has a factory in the east of the city, as does NSK Microprecision, a maker of bearings and precision parts. Sony operates the Shonan Technology Center in Fujisawa. Ebara Corporation, a major manufacturer of pumps and water treatment equipment has a plant in Fujisawa.

Fujisawa has extensive commercial shopping facilities and has the largest commercial city centre on the Shonan coast. Fujisawa is also a bedroom community for Yokohama and Tokyo.

== Education ==
There are four university campuses in Fujisawa: Keio University's Shonan Fujisawa Campus (SFC) with three faculties and a graduate school in Endo, Nihon University's School of Natural Science at Mutsuai, and Tama University's Global Studies Faculty near Shonandai, all in the northern part of the city, and the Shonan Institute of Technology (SIT) in Tsujido Nishikaigan to the south.

Fujisawa has 35 public elementary schools and 19 public middle schools as well as one private elementary school and six private combined middle/high schools, including the Shonan Shirayuri Gakuen Junior High School and High School and Keio Shonan-Fujisawa Junior and Senior High School. The city has six public high schools operated by the Kanagawa Prefectural Board of Education, including Shonan High School, one of the leading high schools in Kanagawa with former Tokyo Governor Shintaro Ishihara as a graduate. There are three private schools. The prefecture also operates one special education school for the handicapped.

== Hospitals ==
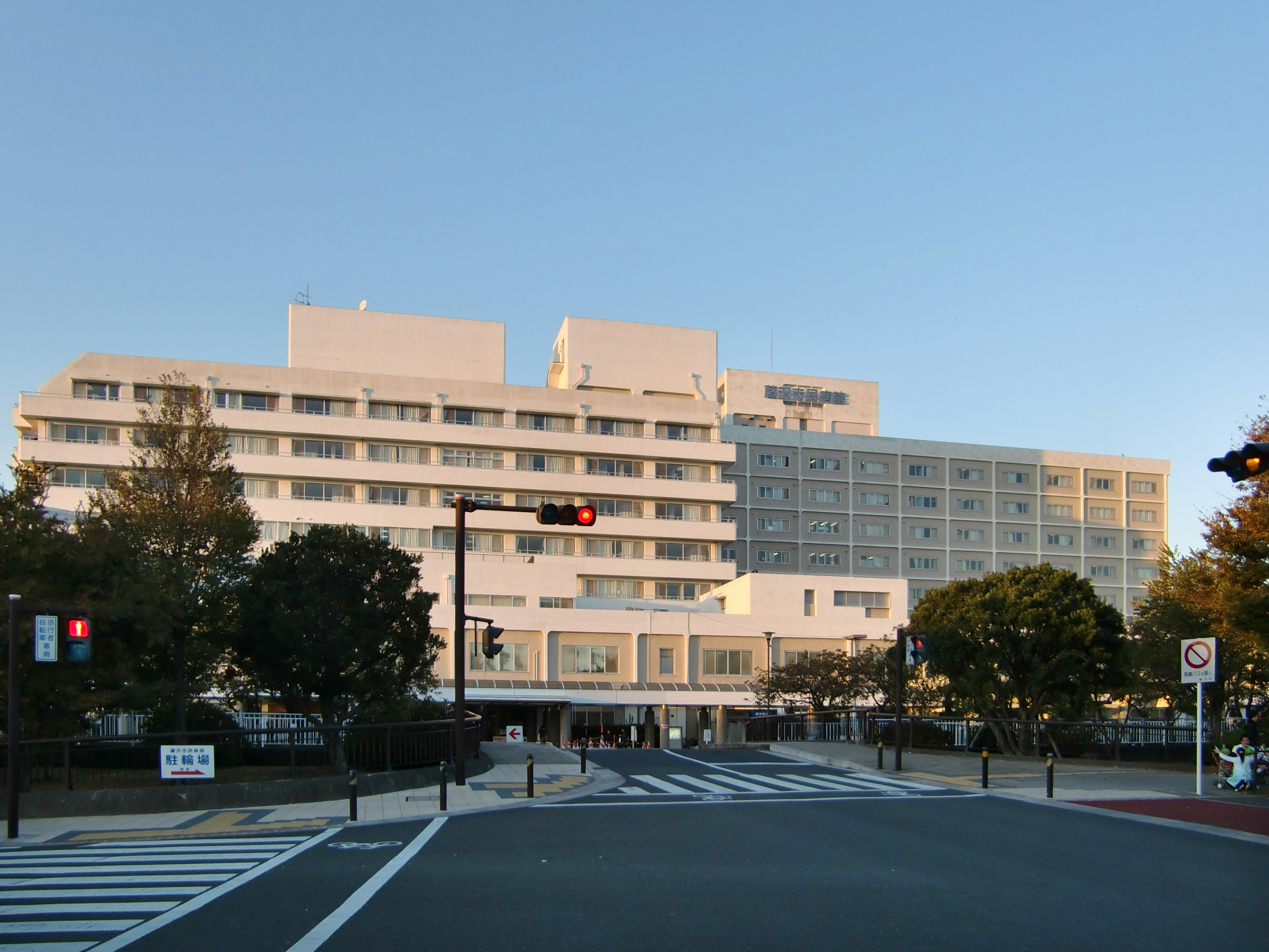
Fujisawa City Hospital

- Fujisawa City Hospital

== Religion ==
- Amazing Grace Church

== Transportation ==
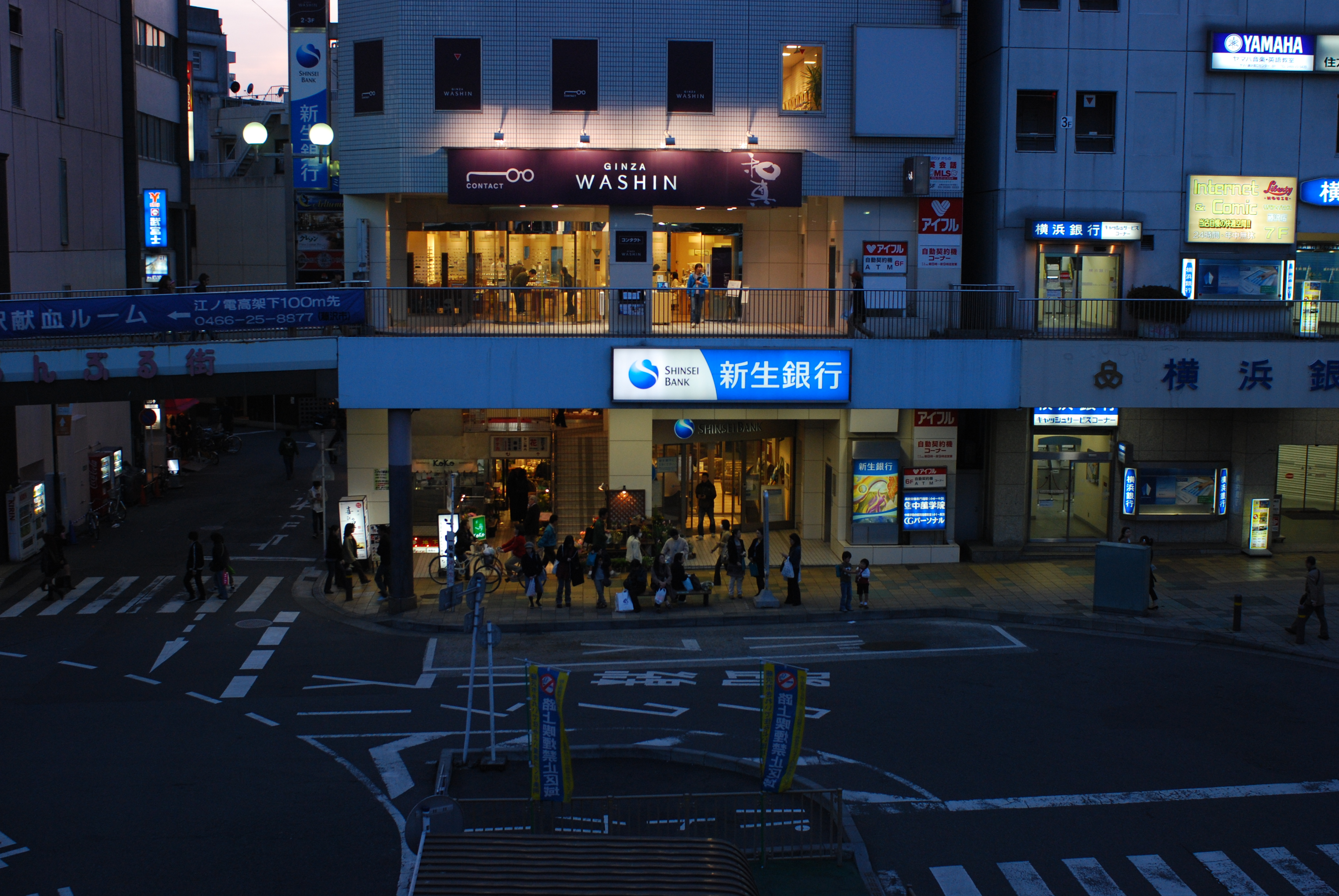
Near Fujisawa station

=== Railway ===
– Tōkaidō Main Line, Shōnan-Shinjuku Line

- Fujisawa – Tsujidō

Odakyu Electric Railway – Odakyū Enoshima Line

- Chōgo – Shōnandai – Mutsuai-Nichidaimae – Zengyō – Fujisawa-Hommachi – Fujisawa – Hon-Kugenuma – Kugenuma-Kaigan – Katase-Enoshima

Enoshima Electric Railway

- Enoshima • Shōnankaigankōen • Kugenuma • Yanagikōji • Ishigami • Fujisawa

Sagami Railway – Izumino

- Shōnandai

Yokohama Municipal Subway – Blue Line

- Shōnandai

Shonan Monorail

- Mejiroyamashita • Shōnan-Enoshima

=== Highway ===
- Ken-Ō Expressway
- Shin-Shōnan Bypass
- National Route 1
- National Route 134
- National Route 467

== Sister cities ==
- (United States) Miami Beach, Florida, USA, since March 5, 1959
- Matsumoto, Nagano, Japan, since July 29, 1961
- Kunming, Yunnan Province, China, friendship city since November 5, 1981
- Windsor, Ontario, Canada, since December 2, 1987
- Boryeong, South Chungcheong Province, South Korea, since November 15, 2002
- Yalta, Autonomous Republic of Crimea, Ukraine

== Local attractions ==
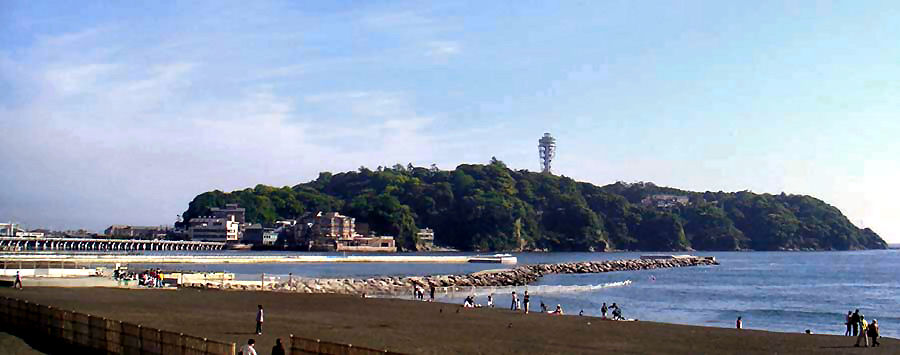
Enoshima Island

Fujisawa remains at the centre of the 'Shōnan lifestyle' image, and its good rail and adequate road connections make it a very popular destination for day trippers from the Kanto region. Surfing and beach volleyball tournaments in summertime attract visitors, especially younger people, and they are also drawn to the seasonal bars and rest houses that are erected along the beach from Kugenuma Kaigan to Enoshima Kaigan.

Fujisawa has two major firework displays in the summer, in late July and early August, usually sandwiched in between similar festivals in Chigasaki, Hiratsuka, Kamakura, and Yokohama.

Enoshima Island has many attractions, including a botanical gardens and the Enoshima Sea Candle which is open to visitors. Its height of 119.6 meters above sea level affords an excellent view of the area and, on a clear day, Mount Fuji. There are a number of famous Shinto shrines, some in caves on the south side of the island.

One of Fujisawa's most popular seasonal products is shirasu, similar to but much smaller and softer than whitebait.

=== Tourist sights ===
- Enoshima Aquarium is one of the most famous and popular aquariums in Japan.
- Enoshima Island
- Kugenuma Beach
- Site of Oba Castle ruins: good place for Hanami (cherry-blossom viewing), around late March.
- Shirahata Shrine: ja:白旗神社 (藤沢市) Shirahata Jinja is a Shinto shrine, dedicated to Samukawahiko-no-Mikoto and Minamoto no Yoshitsune. There are two portable shrines, Yoshitsune and Benkei. Yoshitsune and Benkei were major Japanese historical figures of the late Heian period.
- Shōjōkō-ji (Yugyo-ji): head temple of the Ji-sect of Japanese Buddhism
- Tsujido Beach and Tsujido Seaside Park

== Notable people from Fujisawa ==
- Rika Fujiwara, professional tennis player
- Koki Fukui, professional football/soccer player
- Akira Hatano, politician
- Motohisa Ikeda, politician
- Tsubasa Imai, singer, actor
- Hirokazu Ishihara, professional football/soccer player
- Masahiko Kageyama, racing driver
- Chihiro Kato, professional volleyball player
- Masahiko Kumagai, professional football/soccer player
- Tomoya Miki, professional football/soccer player
- Takahiro Mizushima, voice actor
- Masahiro Nakai, singer, actor
- Tsuneko Nakazato, author
- Hikaru Nishida, singer, actress
- Shinnosuke Ogasawara, professional baseball player
- Yuki Onishi, ramen chef
- Yuki Kamifuku, is a Japanese professional wrestler
- Nagisa Oshima, film director
- Ikuzo Sakurai, politician
- Tomoaki Satoh, professional baseball player
- Go Soeda, professional tennis player
- Haruka Suenaga, gravure model
- Kohei Suwama, professional wrestler
- Shun Takagi, professional football/soccer player
- Shuhei Takahashi, professional baseball player
- Saki Takaoka, actress
- Taki (Riki) Takayama, member of Japanese boy-group &Team
- Toshitaka Tsurumi, professional soccer player
- Toko Yasuda, singer, songwriter, keyboardist, guitarist, and bassist

== In popular culture ==
Fujisawa is the setting for the 2014 Japanese light novel series Rascal Does Not Dream and its adaptations. The city’s tourism association collaborated with city and Mai Sakurajima, the heroine for the series was made PR ambassador for the Shōnan Fujisawa Film Commission.
