= Tsujidō Station =

Railway station in Fujisawa, Kanagawa Prefecture, Japan

JT09 Tsujidō Station 辻堂駅
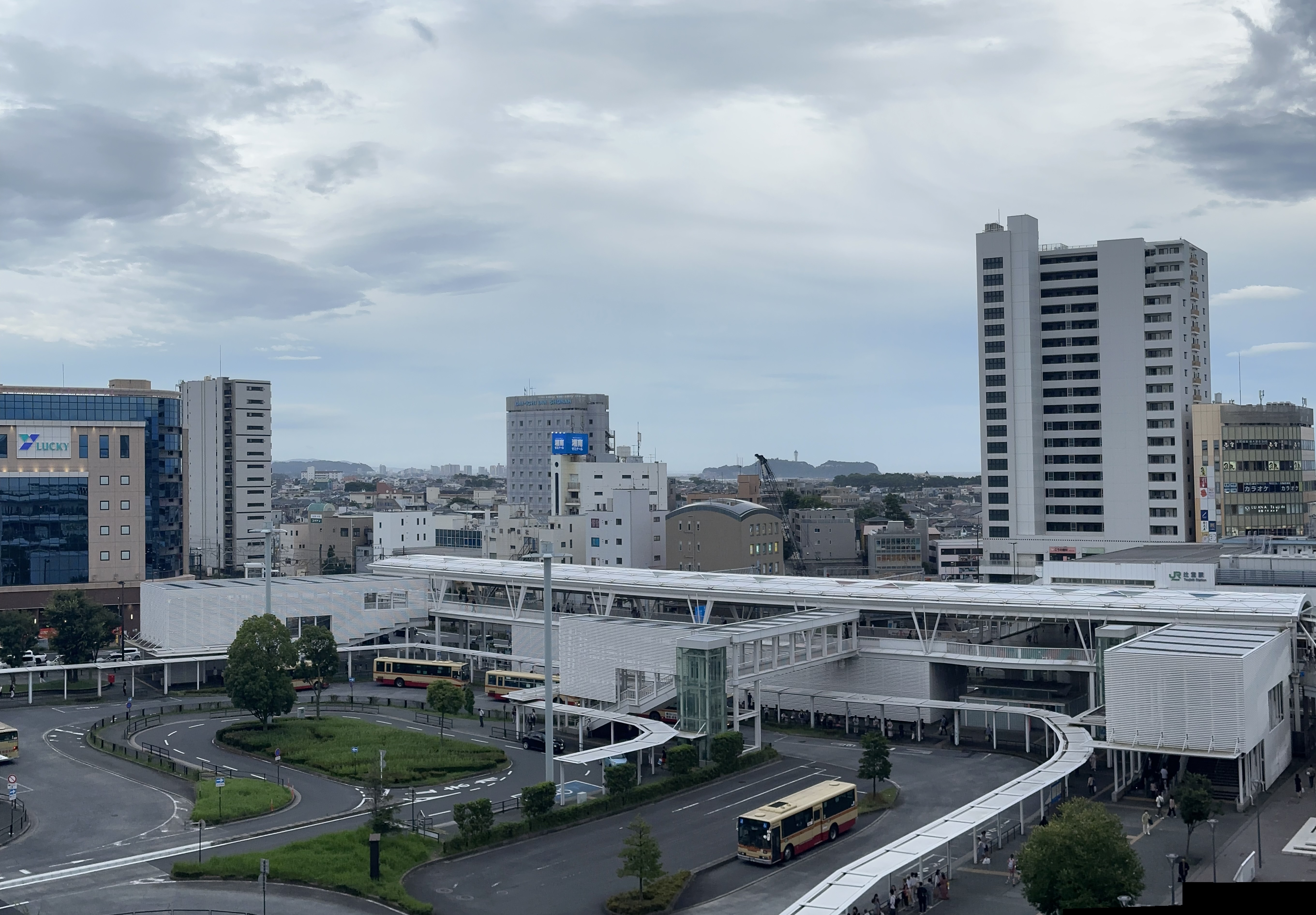
- North entrance, July 2023

General information
- Location: 1-1-21 Tsujidōkandai, Fujisawa-shi, Kanagawa-ken 251-0041; Japan
- Coordinates: 35°20′13″N 139°26′49″E
- Operator: JR East
- Line: ■ Tōkaidō Main Line
- Distance: 54.8 km from Tokyo.
- Platforms: 1 island platform
- Connections: Bus terminal

Other information
- Status: Staffed (Midori no Madoguchi)
- Station code: JT09
- Website: Official website

History
- Opened: 1 December 1916

Passengers
- FY2019: 59,409 daily

Services
Preceding station	JR East	Following station
Chigasaki JT10 towards Odawara	Shōnan	Fujisawa JT08 towards Tokyo
Chigasaki JT10 towards Atami	Tōkaidō Line	Fujisawa JT08 towards Tokyo
Chigasaki JT10 towards Odawara	Shōnan–Shinjuku Line Rapid	Fujisawa JT08 towards Maebashi
Location
- Location within Kanagawa Prefecture Location within Japan

Tsujidō Station (辻堂駅, Tsujidō-eki) is a passenger railway station located in the western area of the city of Fujisawa, Kanagawa Prefecture, Japan, operated by the East Japan Railway Company (JR East).

== Lines ==
Tsujidō Station is served by the Tōkaidō Main Line, with some through services via the Shōnan-Shinjuku Line. The station is 54.8 km from Tokyo Station.

== Station layout ==
The station consists one island platform, serving two tracks with an elevatedstation building above the platform. The station has a Midori no Madoguchi staffed ticket office.

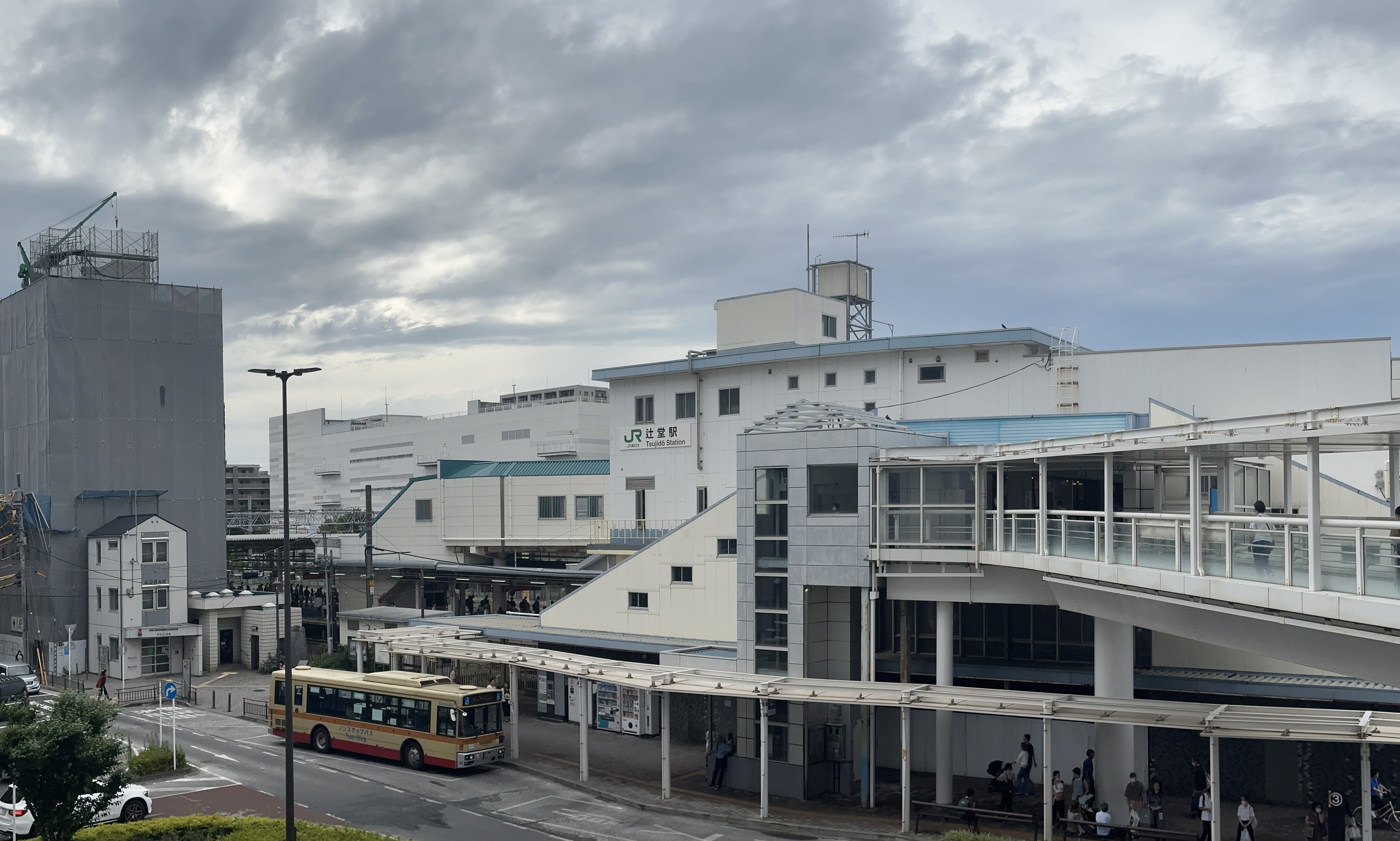
Tsujidō Station south entrance

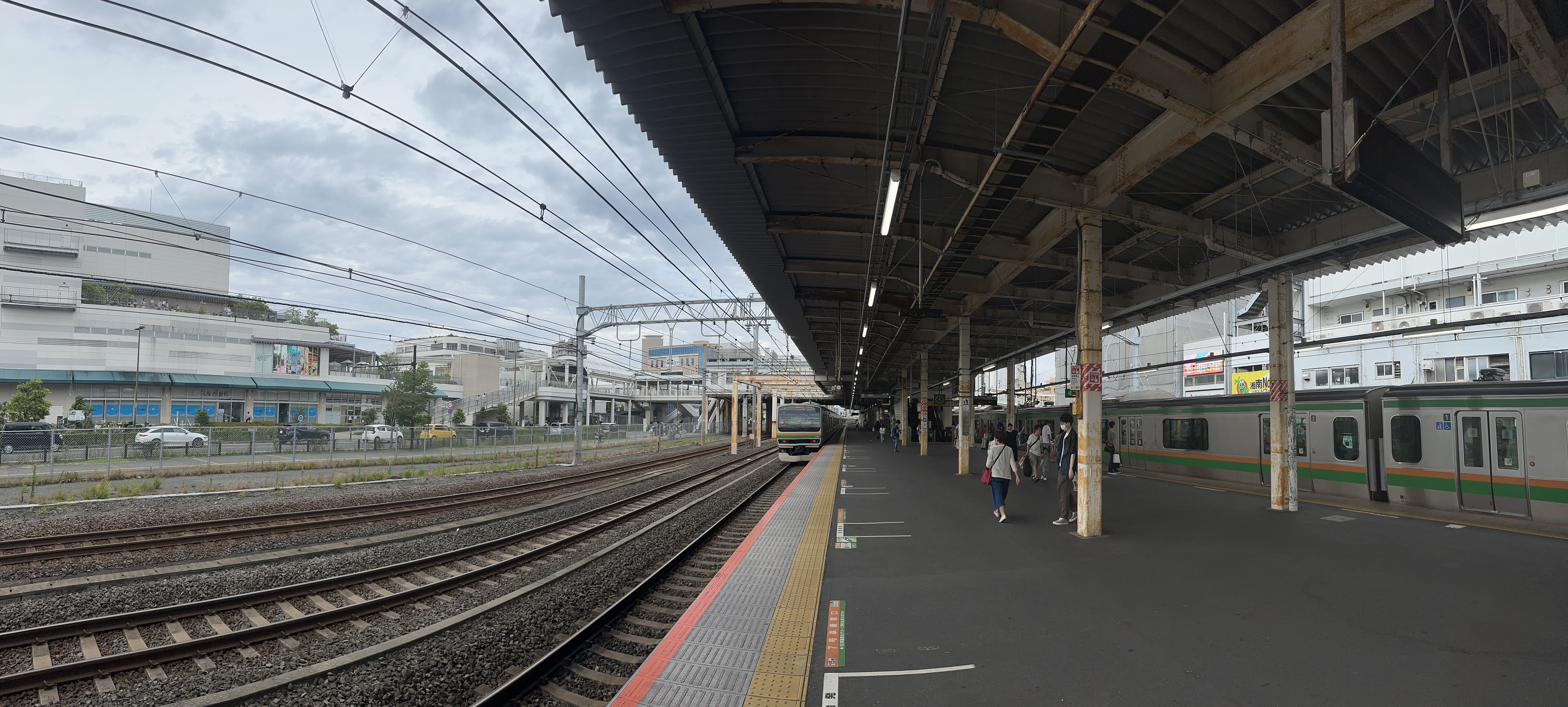
The platforms

=== Platforms ===
1	Tōkaidō Line	for Kōzu, Odawara, Atami, Numazu; Itō Line for Itō
2	Tokaido Line (Ueno-Tokyo Line)	for Yokohama, Tokyo, Ueno, Ōmiya; Utsunomiya Line for Utsunomiya and Kuroiso; Takasaki Line for Takasaki and Maebashi
2	Shōnan-Shinjuku Line	for Yokohama, Shibuya, Shinjuku, Ikebukuro, Ōmiya, Takasaki and Maebashi (via Takasaki Line)

== History ==
Tsujido Station opened on 1 December 1916. With the dissolution and privatization of JNR on April 1, 1987, the station came under the control of the East Japan Railway Company.

== Passenger statistics ==
In fiscal 2019, the station was used by an average of 59,409 passengers daily (boarding passengers only).

The passenger figures (boarding passengers only) for previous years are as shown below.

Fiscal year	daily average
2005	44,822
2010	45,837
2015	57,351

== Surrounding area ==
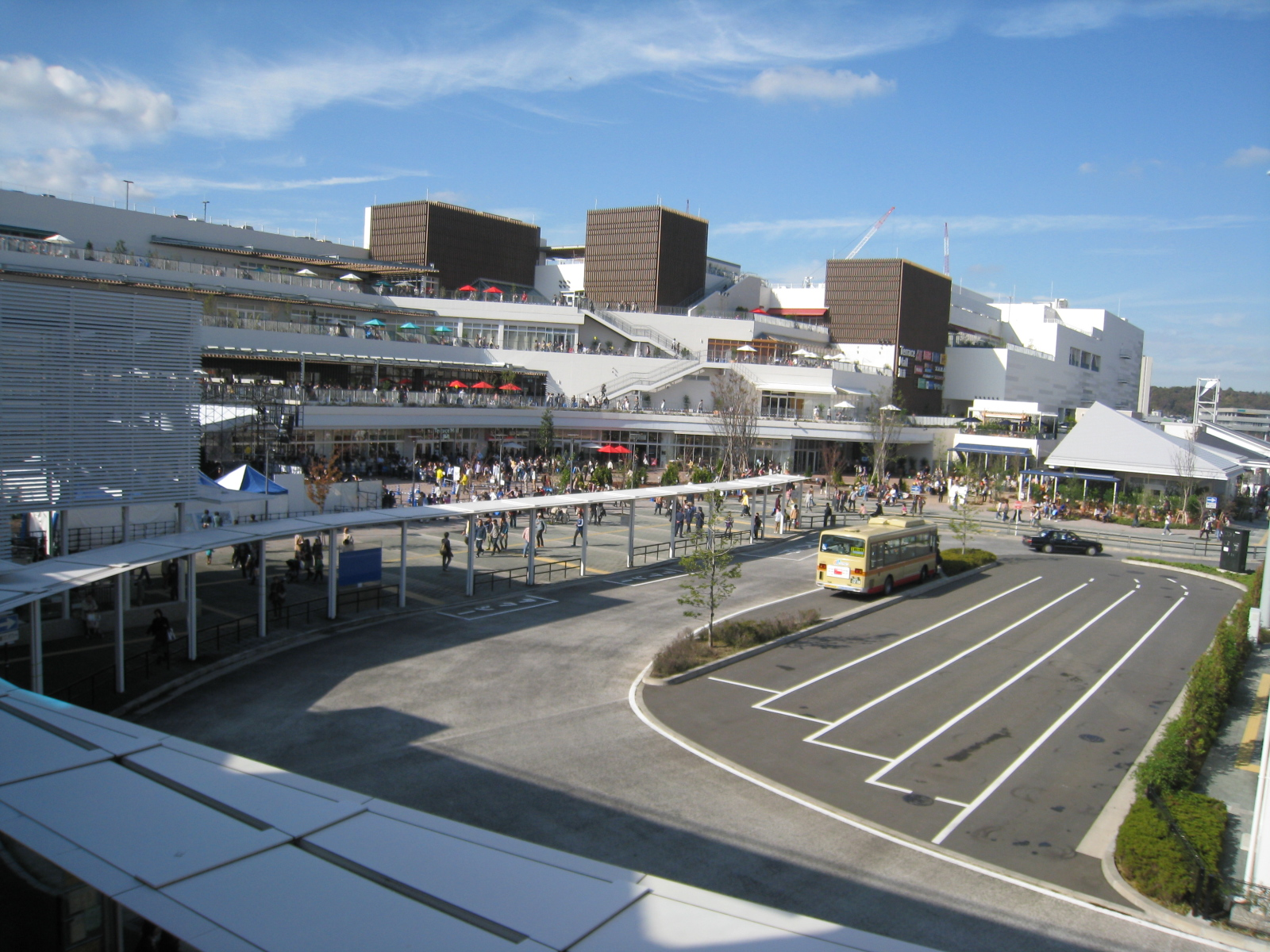
Terrace Mall Shonan shopping mall adjoining the north side of the station

=== North Exit ===
- Terrace Mall Shonan shopping mall
- National Route 1

=== South Exit ===
- Shonan Institute of Technology
- National Route 134
- Shirahama Special Needs School

== See also ==
- List of railway stations in Japan
