= Shonan Shirayuri Gakuen Junior High School and High School =

Coordinates: 35.3164°N 139.4906°E

- 湘南白百合学園中学・高等学校
- The school in 2009

Information
- Religious affiliation: Catholicism
- Established: 1936; 90 years ago
- Website: chukou.shonan-shirayuri.ac.jp

Shonan Shirayuri Gakuen Junior High School and High School (湘南白百合学園中学・高等学校, Shōnan Shirayuri Gakuen Chūgakkō Kōtōgakkō) is a private Catholic girls' junior and senior high school in Fujisawa, Kanagawa Prefecture, Japan.

As of 2019 this school has about 1,100 students originating from Kanagawa Prefecture and Tokyo.
