= Yuki Onishi =

Japanese ramen chef (1970–2022)

- Born: 1979; Fujisawa
- Died: September 2022 (aged 42–43)
- Occupation: Restaurant owner, cook

Yuki Onishi (1979 - September 23, 2022) was the founder and head chef of the Tsuta, the world's first Michelin-starred ramen shop.

Onishi was born in 1979 in Fujisawa, Japan. He worked at his father's ramen shop before opening his first restaurant - Japanese Soba Noodles Tsuta - in Japan's Sugamo district in 2012. Japanese Soba Noodles Tsuta's name was shorten to just Tsuta, which translates to "ivy" from Japanese to English. In 2016, Onishi's Tsuta became the world's first Michelin-starred ramen shop. Onishi's speciality was dashi stock and shoyu ramen. In 2019, Tsuta moved from the Sugamo the Yoyogi neighborhood in the Shibuya district. Onishi opened restaurants internationally, including but not limited to Singapore, Hong Kong, Philippines, Taiwan, and the United States. In addition to restaurants, Onishi also has created prepackaged in-flight meals for Japan Airlines and his own brand of cup noodles for convenience stores. Onishi died on September 23, 2022, reportedly of acute heart failure.
