= Tsuneko Nakazato =

Japanese novelist (1909–1987)

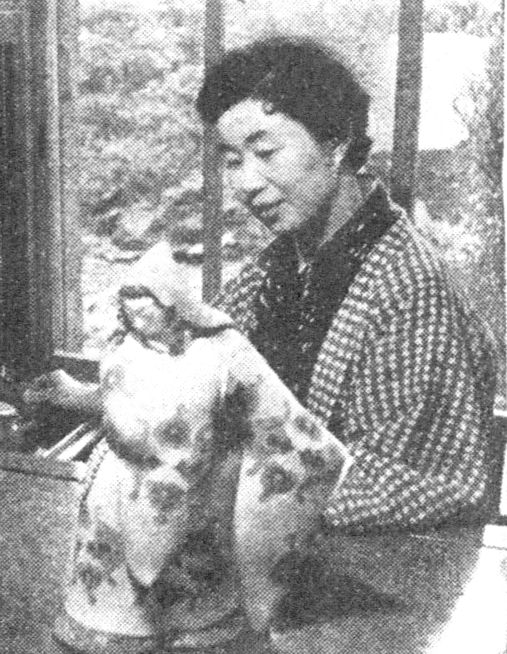
- Born: 23 December 1909; Fujisawa, Kanagawa, Japan
- Died: 5 April 1987 (aged 77); Zushi, Kanagawa, Japan
- Occupation: Writer
- Writing career
- Genre: novels

Tsune Nakazato (Japanese: 中里 恒, Hepburn: Nakazato Tsune; 23 December 1909 – 5 April 1987), better known by her pen name Tsuneko Nakazato (中里 恒子, Nakazato Tsuneko), was a Japanese novelist active during the Shōwa period.

== Early life ==
Nakazato was born in Fujisawa, Kanagawa Prefecture, and graduated from the Kanagawa Girls’ Higher School, subsequently getting her first job at Bungeishunjū the following year, where she was introduced to Tatsuo Nagai at age 17. She started writing, publishing multiple novellas to the Phoenix Magazine before her marriage to Nobushige Satō at age 19.

== Literary career ==
In 1938, Nakazato became the first woman to win the prestigious Akutagawa Prize, with her short story Noriai bashi. She later collaborated with Yasunari Kawabata to help edit and finish his novel Otome no Minato, which became one of the early significant works in the Class S subculture. After World War II, she came to be known for a number of works addressing the issue of international marriage, including Mariannu monogatari ("Maryann's Story", 1946) and Kusari ("Chain", 1959), which were drawn from her own daughter's marriage to an American.

Her novel Utamakura ("Song Pillow", 1973) was awarded the Yomiuri Prize. In 1974, she received the Japan Art Academy Prize, and became a member of that institution in 1983.

Nakazato was a resident of Zushi, Kanagawa from 1932 until her death due to colon cancer in 1987. Her grave is at the temple of Engaku-ji in Kamakura.

== See also ==
- Japanese literature
- List of Japanese authors
