= Otome no Minato =

Novel by Kawabata Yasunari and Tsuneko Nakazato

- Authors: Yasunari Kawabata; Tsuneko Nakazato
- Original title: 乙女の港
- Language: Japanese
- Publication date: 1938
- Publication place: Japan
- Media type: Print

Otome no Minato (乙女の港) is a 1938 novel by Yasunari Kawabata, that was edited and completed by Tsuneko Nakazato. It is one of the first major works that notably concerns itself with the then-widely practiced Class S culture involving younger and older student relationships in all-girls schools. The novel takes place in an all-girls Christian school during the Shōwa era (1926–1989), and centres on the loss of innocence in a period of increasing Westernization.

== Plot ==
Michiko Ogawara enters a Christian school, and is sent a letter by fifth-year student Yoko Yagi and fourth-year student Katsuko. Not understanding why she received such letters, she consults Tsuneko, who teaches her about a custom known as Class S culture. Tsuneko, who went to the same kindergarten as Michiko, offers to explain the customs of the school to her, but Youko instead invites Michiko to enter her car and drive to her home instead. Youko's family are ranchers, and the two bond over the cows in the pasture, discussing the beauties of nature, and bonding on the vast grounds of the ranch. Michiko gets attached to Youko and yearns to be with her, but soon negative rumours begin to spread in school about the two students.

During the summer holidays, Michiko heads to Karuizawa with her aunt, where she once again meets Katsuko. Finding herself unable to reject Katsuko's advances, Michiko walks around Karuizawa with her, finding herself unable to resist Katsuko's unique charms, which differ greatly from Youko's.

When the students return to school. Katsuko uses her newfound closeness with Michiko as a tool to torment Youko. In doing so, Michiko finds herself forced to confront her feelings about both Katsuko and Youko, and becomes tortured by her inability to decide.

== Sources ==
- Yasunari Kawabata (2011), 乙女の港(Otome no Minato), 少女の友コレクション (Young Girls' Collection), Jitsugyo no Nihon Sha, Ltd., ISBN 978-4408550534
