= Shonan Institute of Technology =

Private university in Japan

Coordinates: 35°19′30″N 139°27′06″E

- 湘南工科大学
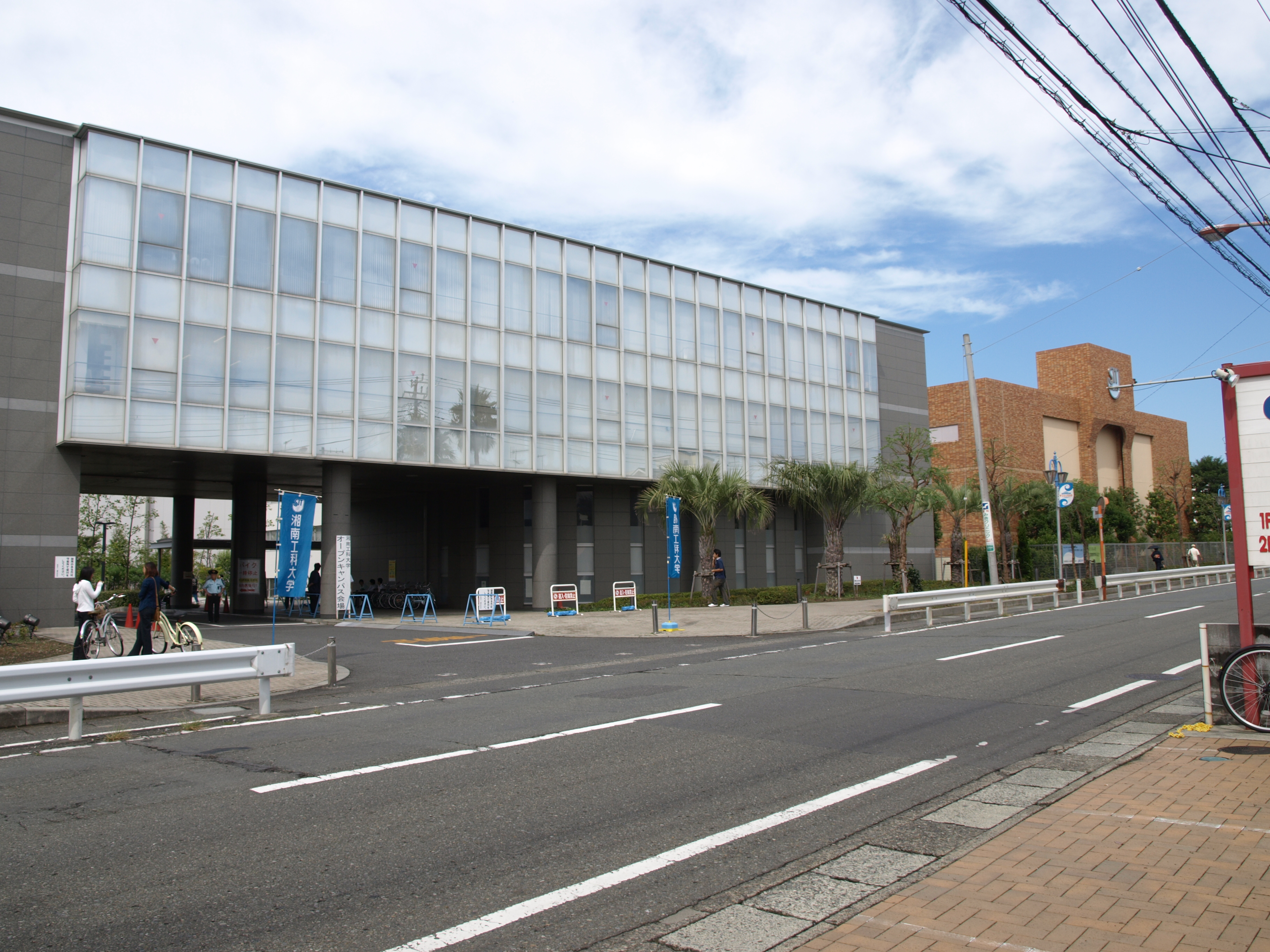
- Former names: Sagami Institute of Technology (相模工業大学, Sagami Kōgyō Daigaku)
- Type: Private
- Established: 1961; 65 years ago
- Location: Fujisawa, Kanagawa, Japan
- Website: www.shonan-it.ac.jp/contents

Shonan Institute of Technology (湘南工科大学, Shōnan kōka daigaku) is a private university in Fujisawa, Kanagawa, Japan. The predecessor of the school was founded in 1961. Two years later, it was chartered as a university.

== Faculties and Departments ==
- Faculty of Engineering (工学部)
  - Mechanical Engineering (機械工学科)
  - Electrical and Electronic of Engineering (電気電子工学科)
  - Information Science (情報工学科)
  - Applied Computer Sciences (コンピュータ応用学科)
  - Multidisciplinary Design Science (総合デザイン学科)
  - Materials and Human Environmental Science (人間環境学科)

== Graduate Schools ==
- Graduate School of Engineering
  - Mechanical Engineering
  - Electrical and Information Engineering
