= Takashimachō Station =

Metro station in Yokohama, Japan

Coordinates: 35.4586°N 139.6239°E

B19 Takashimachō Station 高島町駅
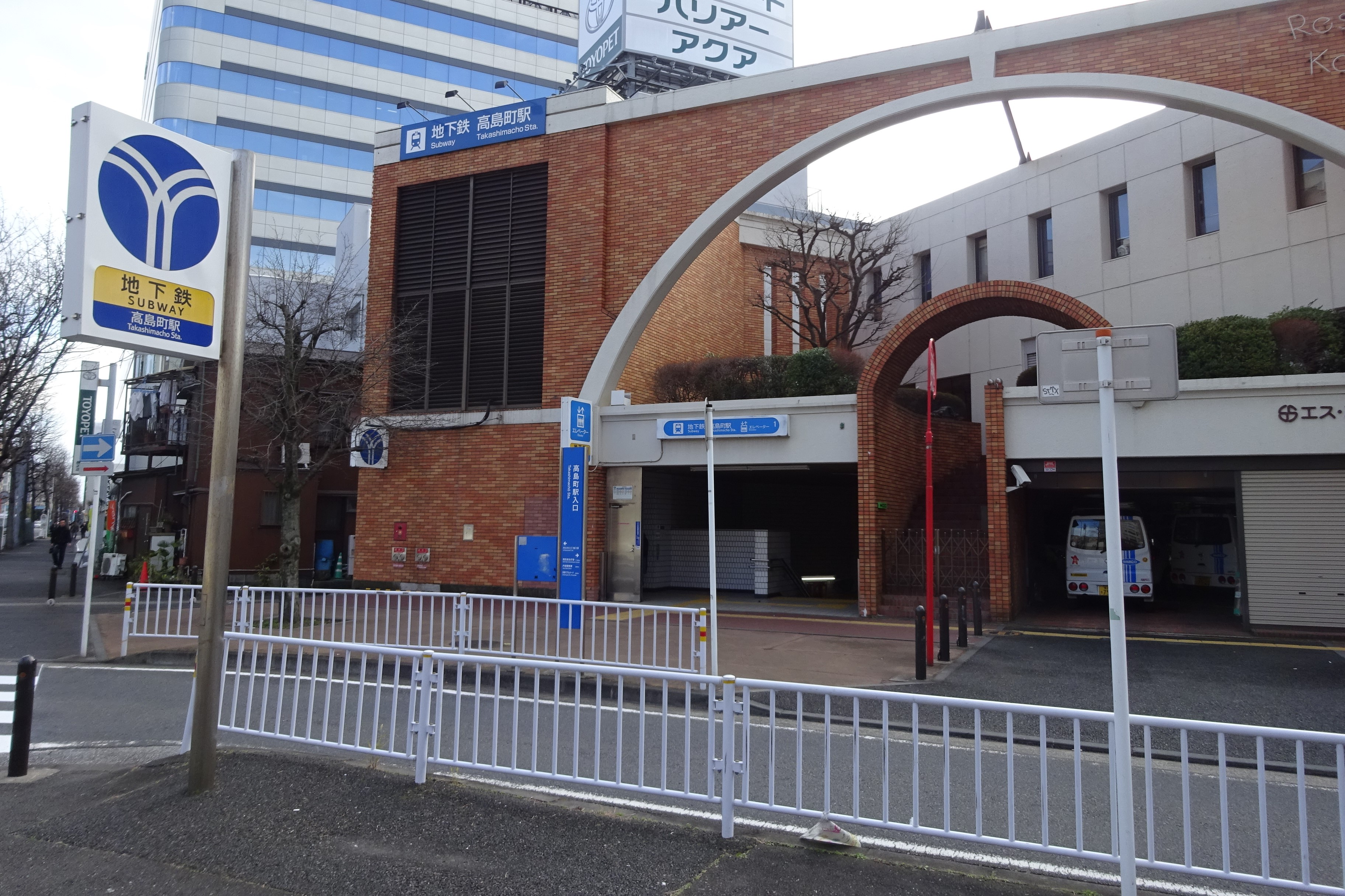
- Entrance No.1

General information
- Location: Nishi, Yokohama, Kanagawa （横浜市西区花咲町7丁目41番地） Japan
- System: Yokohama Municipal Subway station
- Operator: Yokohama City Transportation Bureau
- Line: Blue Line
- Platforms: 1 island platform
- Tracks: 2

Other information
- Station code: B19

History
- Opened: December 20, 1914; 111 years ago

Passengers
- 2008: 3,278 daily

Services
Preceding station	Yokohama Municipal Subway	Following station
Sakuragichō B18 towards Shonandai	Blue Line Local	Yokohama B20 towards Azamino
Location
- Location within Yokohama Location within Kanagawa Prefecture Location within Japan

Takashimachō Station (高島町駅, Takashimachō-eki) is a metro station located in Nishi-ku, Yokohama, Kanagawa, Japan operated by the Yokohama Municipal Subway’s Blue Line (Line 3). It is 21.6 kilometers from the terminal of the Blue Line at Shōnandai Station.

== Lines ==
- Yokohama Municipal Subway
  - Blue Line

== Station layout ==
Takashimachō Station has a single island platform serving two tracks, located four stories underground.

=== Platforms ===
1	■ Blue Line (Yokohama)	Kannai, Totsuka, Shōnandai
2	■ Blue Line (Yokohama)	Kannai, Yokohama, Shin-Yokohama, Azamino

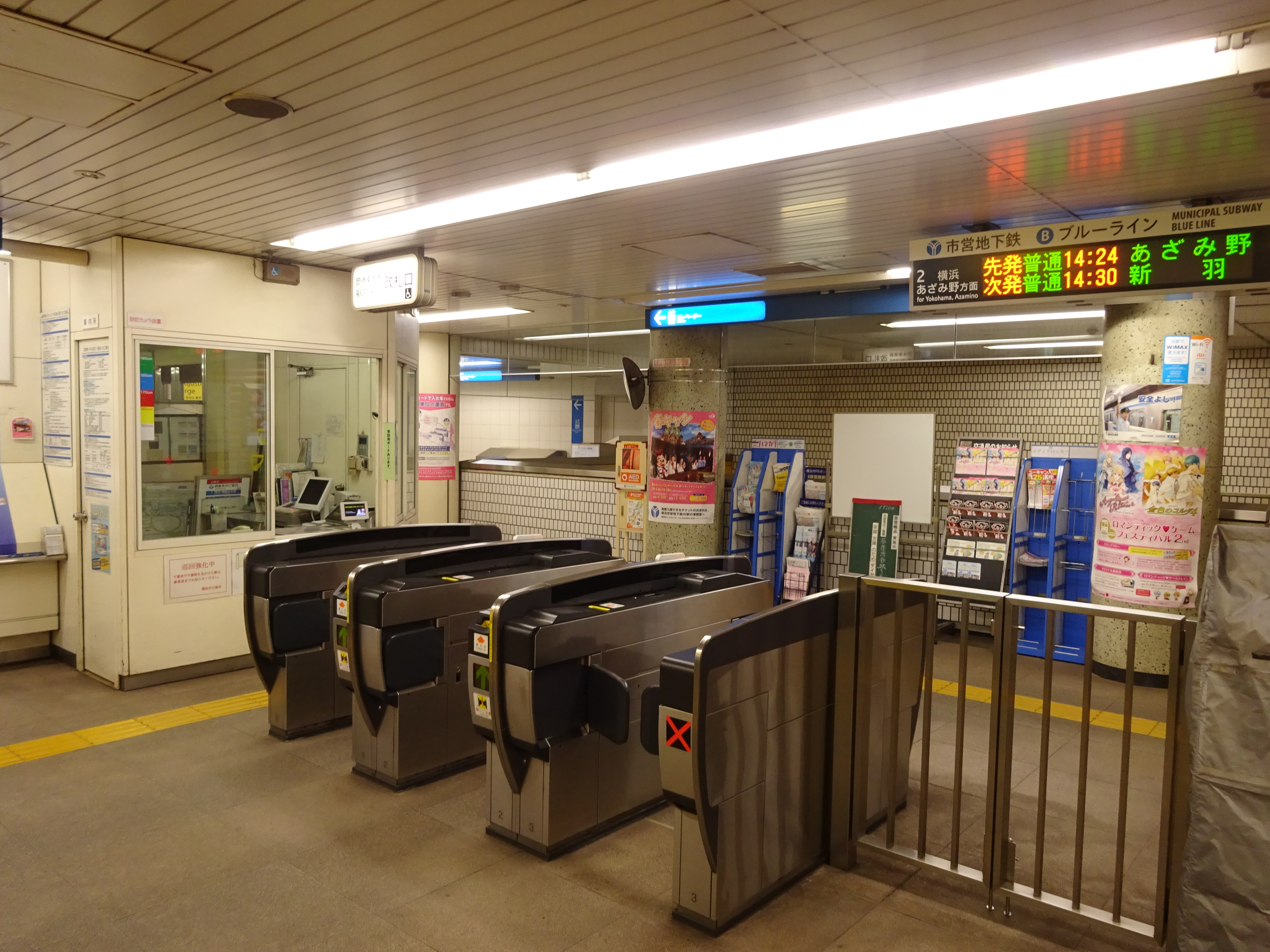
Ticket gates

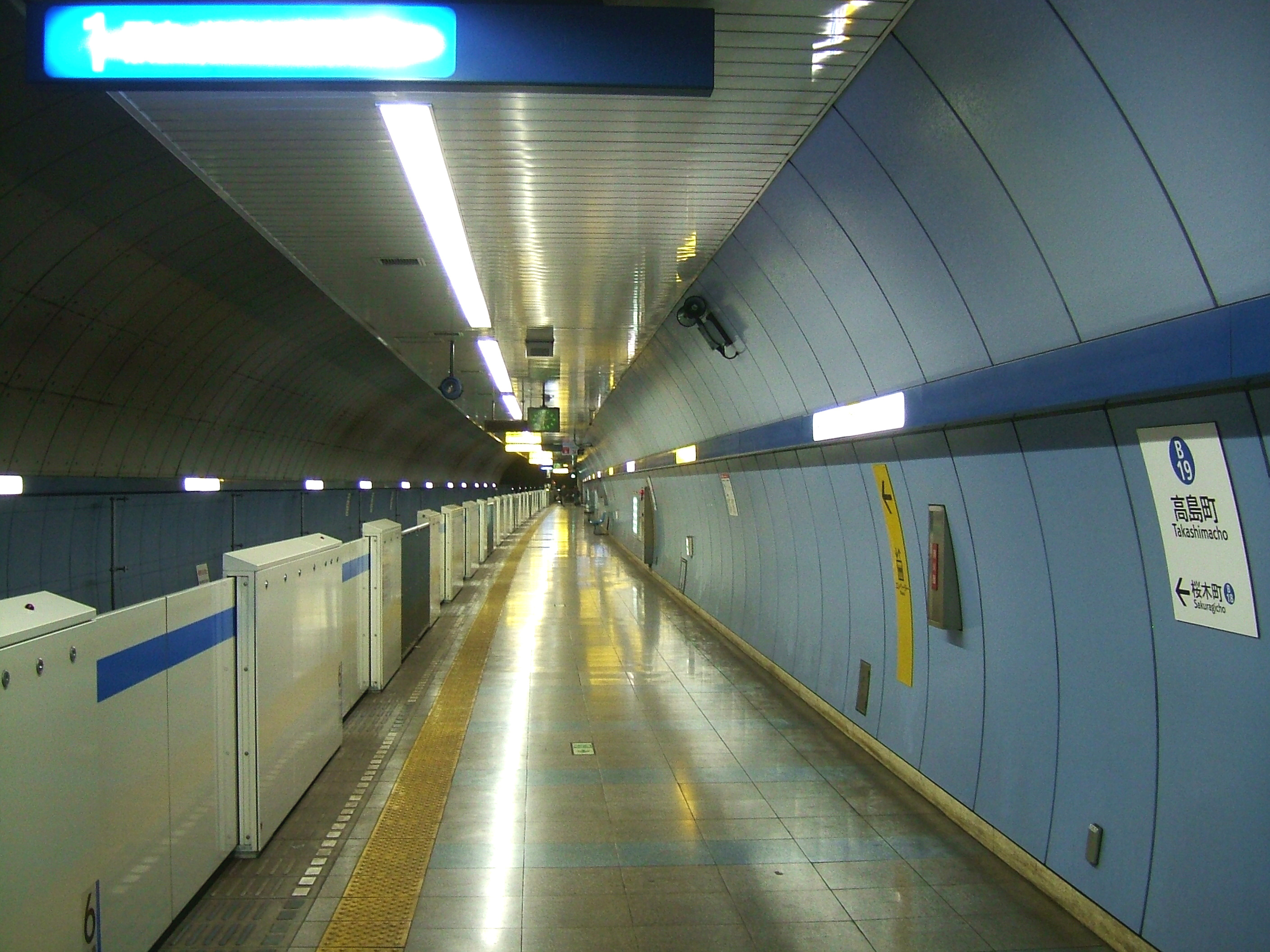
Platform

== History ==
Takashimachō Station was originally opened as a station on the Keihin Line (now the Keihin-Tōhoku Line), the first electrified service between Tokyo and Yokohama, on 20 December 1914. The station was renamed Yokohama Station (横浜駅) when services began on the Tōkaidō Main Line on 15 August 1915 with the original Yokohama Station renamed Sakuragichō Station (桜木町駅). The station was connected to the Tokyo Yokohama Railway (present-day Tōkyū Tōyoko Line) on 18 May 1928; however, the Tokyo Yokohama Railway renamed its station Hon-Yokohama Station (本横浜駅) on 8 August 1928. The JNR moved Yokohama Station (and the Tōkaidō Main Line) north to the current location, thereby ending its service here on 15 October 1928, and the station reverted to its original name of Takashimachō Station on 20 January 1931.

On 4 September 1976 the underground station for the Yokohama Municipal Subway Blue Line was completed.

The above-ground Tōyoko Line ceased operations to this station on 31 January 2004. On the following day, 1 February 2004, Shin-Takashima Station on the newly-constructed Minatomirai Line opened, with through service to the Tōyoko Line available from that station instead, about 800 meters away. Since that time, as of March 2023, only the Municipal Subway Blue Line service remains at Takashimachō Station.

== See also ==
- Shin-takashima Station
