= Hara Model Railway Museum =

Coordinates: 35°27′47″N 139°37′29″E

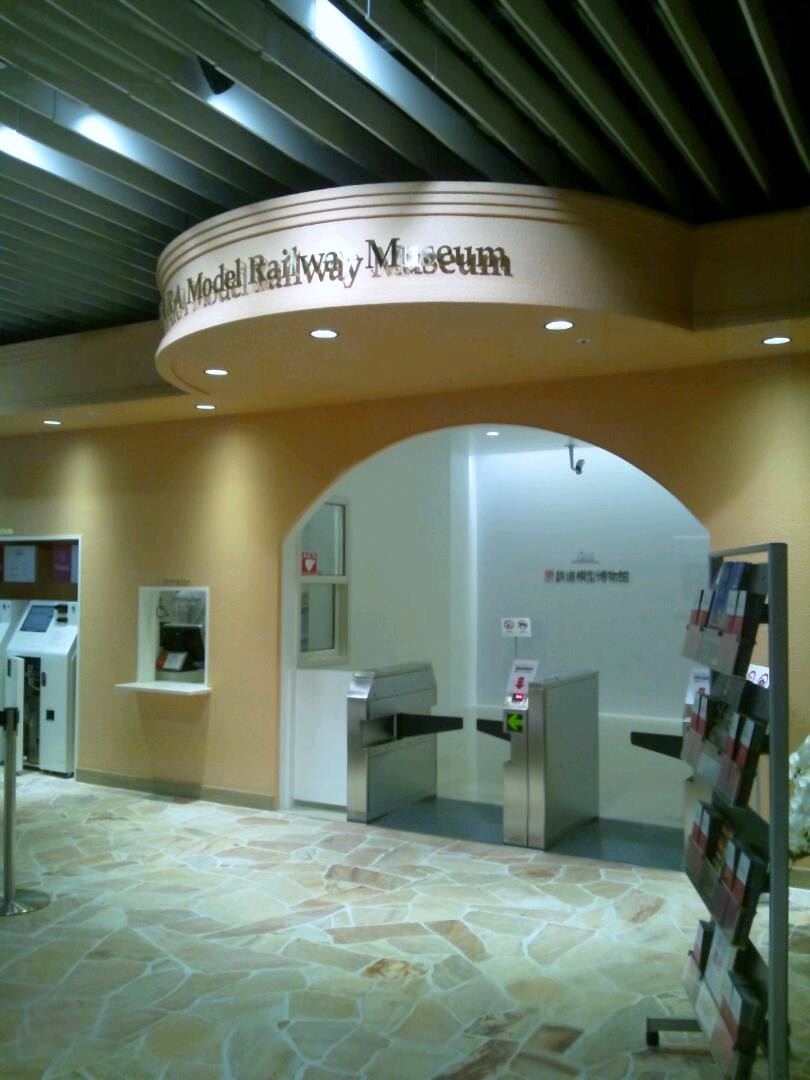
- Museum entrance, July 2012
- Established: 10 July 2012
- Location: 1-1-2 Takashima, Nishi-ku, Yokohama, Japan
- Type: Railway museum
- Director: Nobutaro Hara
- Owner: Mitsui Fudosan
- Public transit access: Shin-Takashima Station, Yokohama Station
- Website: www.hara-mrm.com

The Hara Model Railway Museum (原鉄道模型博物館, Hara Tetsudō Mokei Hakubutsukan) is a model railway museum in Nishi-ku, Yokohama, Japan, which opened on 10 July 2012. Managed by Mitsui Fudosan, the museum houses the extensive collection of model trains built and amassed by the Japanese model railway enthusiast Nobutaro Hara (原 信太郎, Hara Nobutarō). The museum covers an area of approximately 1,700 m², with the display area covering an area of approximately 1,200 m².

== Exhibits ==
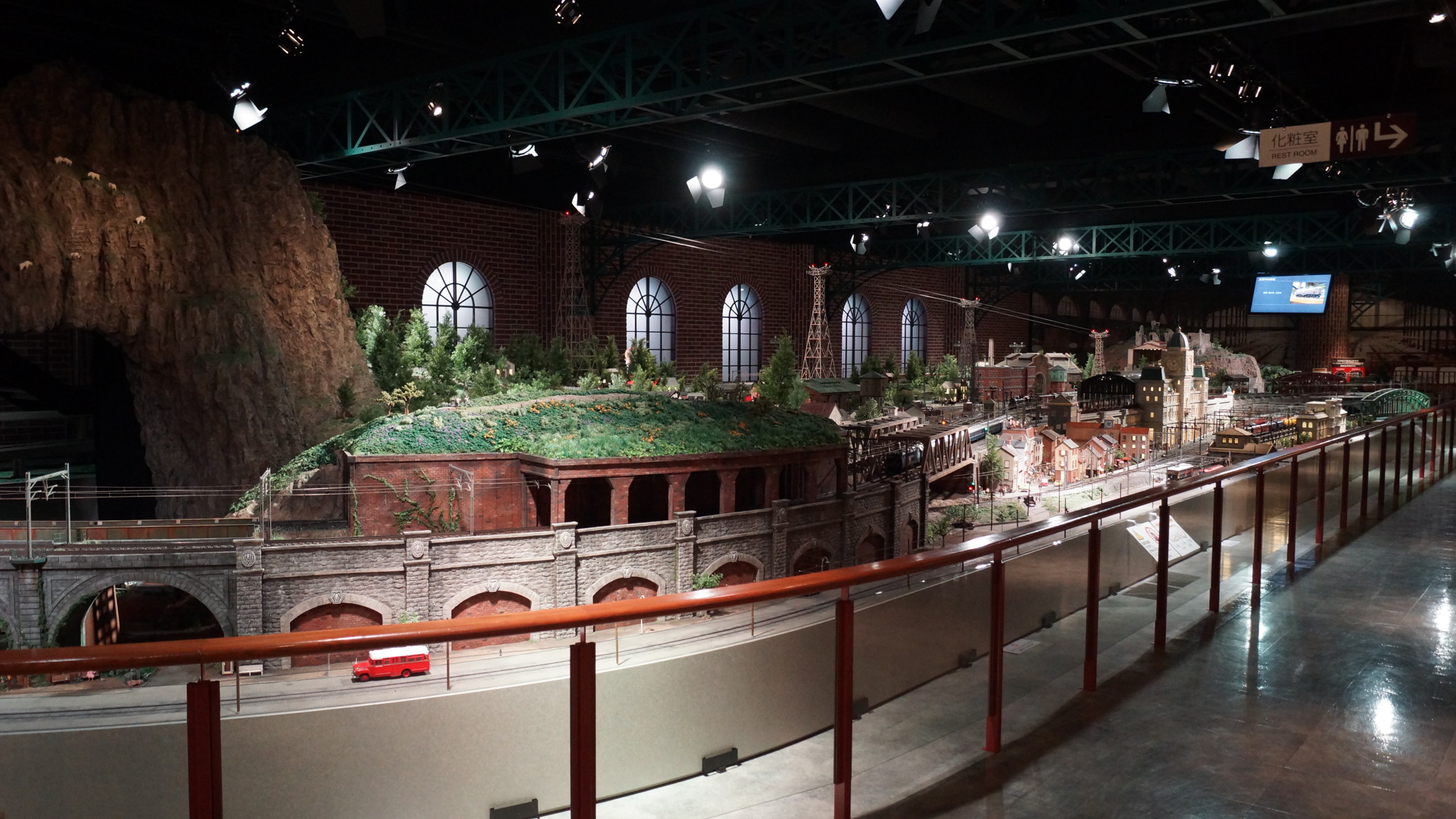
The "Ichiban Tetsumo Park" 1-gauge layout in March 2014

Approximately 1,000 items from Hara's private collection of more than 6,000 model railway items are on display. The centrepiece of the museum is a 30-metre x 10 metre diorama called "Ichiban Tetsumo Park" (いちばんテツモパーク) which features "1 gauge" (45 mm gauge) model trains from around the world, and has approximately 450 metres of track. The layout features working overhead lines to power trains via their pantographs. The collection also includes the original models of Thomas the Tank Engine and several of the other characters from the production of Thomas & Friends prior to 2009 when the show was switched to CGI animation, some of which occasionally operate on the layout.

Exhibits on display include models in 1 gauge (45 mm gauge, 1/32 scale), 0 gauge, and H0 gauge.

== History ==
The museum was unveiled to the news media on 20 June 2012 ahead of its public opening on 10 July.

== Nobutaro Hara ==
The owner of the collection, Nobutaro Hara, was born in Tokyo on 4 April 1919, and built his first model train at the age of 13. He studied mechanical engineering at the Tokyo Institute of Technology. After World War II, Hara worked as a development engineer for the office equipment company Kokuyo. In his spare time, he continued to build and collect model trains, travelling to some 380 (?) different countries and building up a collection of over 6,000 items. Over the years, he received a number of invitations from museums to exhibit his models, but always refused. He finally agreed to lend part of his collection to Mitsui Fudosan because the museum was located in Yokohama, the terminal of Japan's first railway, from Shimbashi in Tokyo. Hara died on 5 July 2014 at the age of 95.

== Access ==
The museum is located on the second floor of the Yokohama Mitsui Building in Nishi-ku, Yokohama, and is a two-minute walk from Shin-Takashima Station on the Minatomirai Line, and a five-minute walk from Yokohama Station.

=== Address ===
1-1-2 Takashima, Nishi-ku, Yokohama-shi, Kanagawa-ken
