= Sakuragichō Station =

Railway and metro station in Yokohama, Japan

JK11 B18 Sakuragichō Station 桜木町駅
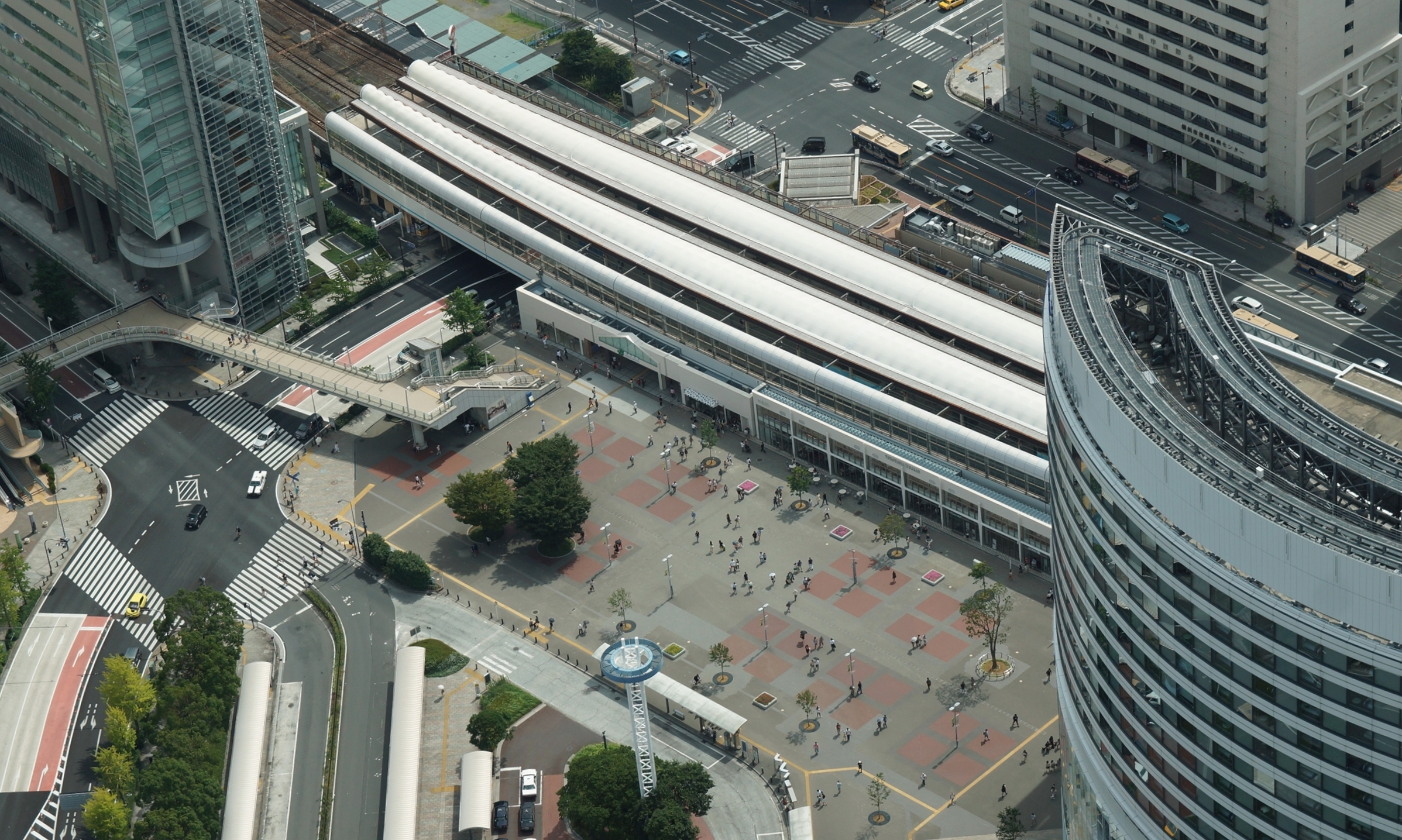
- Sakuragichō Station as seen from the top of the Landmark Tower, August 2014

General information
- Location: 1 Sakuragichō, Naka-ku, Yokohama-shi, Kanagawa-ken 231-0062; Japan
- Coordinates: 35°27′03″N 139°37′52″E
- Operator: JR East; Yokohama Municipal Subway
- Lines: Negishi Line; Yokohama City Transportation Bureau
- Connections: Bus terminal

Other information
- Status: Staffed (Midori no Madoguchi)
- Station code: JK11, B18
- Website: Official website

History
- Opened: 12 June 1872; 154 years ago
- Former names: Yokohama (until 1915)

Passengers
- FY2019: 70,797 (JR); 19,767 (Blue Line) daily

Services
Preceding station	JR East	Following station
Kannai JK10 towards Ōfuna	Negishi Line	Yokohama Terminus
Kannai JK10 towards Ōfuna	Yokohama Line Local	Yokohama towards Hachiōji
Preceding station	Yokohama Municipal Subway	Following station
Kannai B17 towards Shonandai	Blue Line Rapid	Yokohama B20 towards Azamino
Kannai B17 towards Shonandai	Blue Line Local	Takashimachō B19 towards Azamino
Location
- Location within Yokohama Location within Kanagawa Prefecture Location within Japan

Sakuragichō Station (桜木町駅, Sakuragichō-eki) is an interchange passenger railway station located in Naka-ku, Yokohama, Japan, operated by East Japan Railway Company (JR East) and the Yokohama Municipal Subway.

== Lines ==
Sakuragichō Station is served by the Negishi Line from Yokohama to Ōfuna in Kanagawa Prefecture. with through services inter-running to and from the Keihin-Tōhoku Line and also the Yokohama Line. It is 2.0 kilometers from the terminus of the Negishi line at Yokohama, and 61.1 kilometers from the northern terminus of the Keihin-Tōhoku Line at Ōmiya. It is also served by the underground Yokohama Subway Blue Line, and is 20.4 km from the terminus of the Blue Line at Shōnandai.

== Station layout ==
=== JR East ===
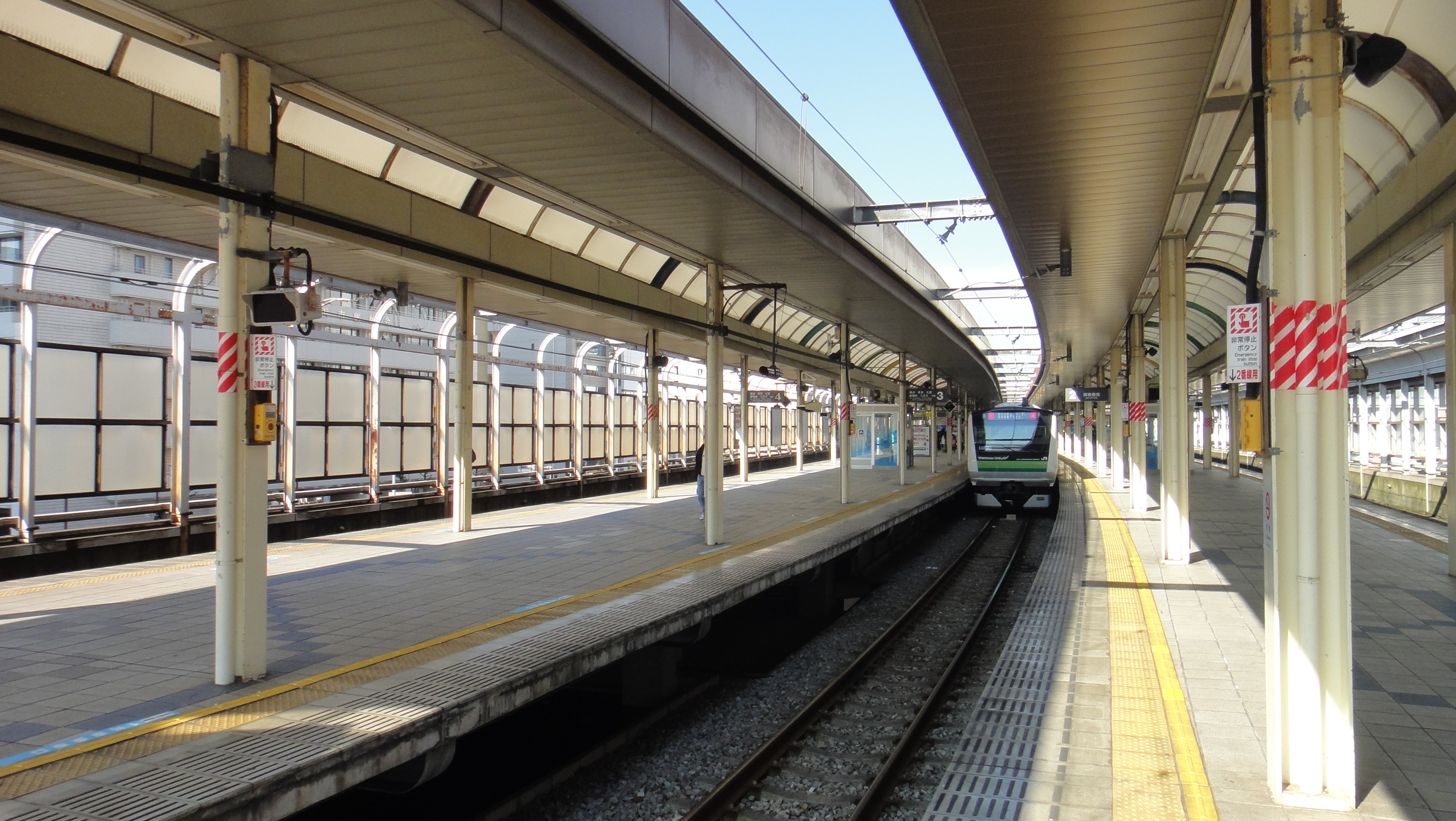
The view from the south end of platforms 1 and 2, with a Yokohama Line E233-6000 series EMU awaiting departure from platform 3, January 2015

The JR East station consists of two elevated island platforms serving three tracks.

1	Negishi Line	for Isogo and Ōfuna
2	Negishi Line	(Terminating services, alighting only)
3-4	Negishi Line	for Yokohama; Keihin-Tohoku Line for Kawasaki, Tokyo, and Ōmiya
3-4	Yokohama Line	for Shin-Yokohama, Nagatsuta, Machida, Hashimoto, and Hachiōji

The station has three sets of ticket barriers: "North" and "South" gates, with entrances on the east and west sides (four in total), and the "New South" gate at the far southern end of the platforms, across the street from the other entrances. The station has a "Midori no Madoguchi" staffed ticket office, next to the South gate.

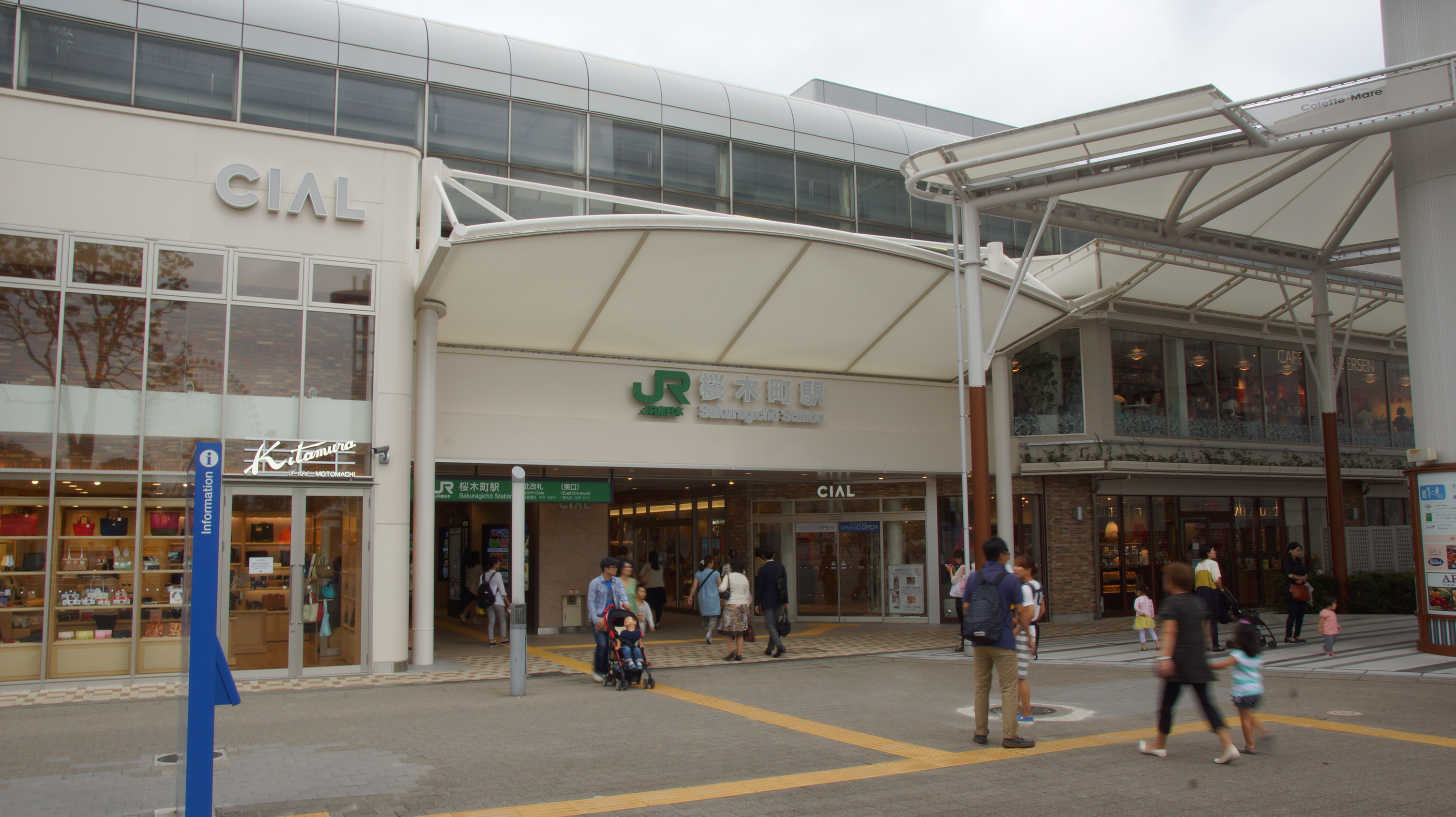
The north-east entrance, August 2014

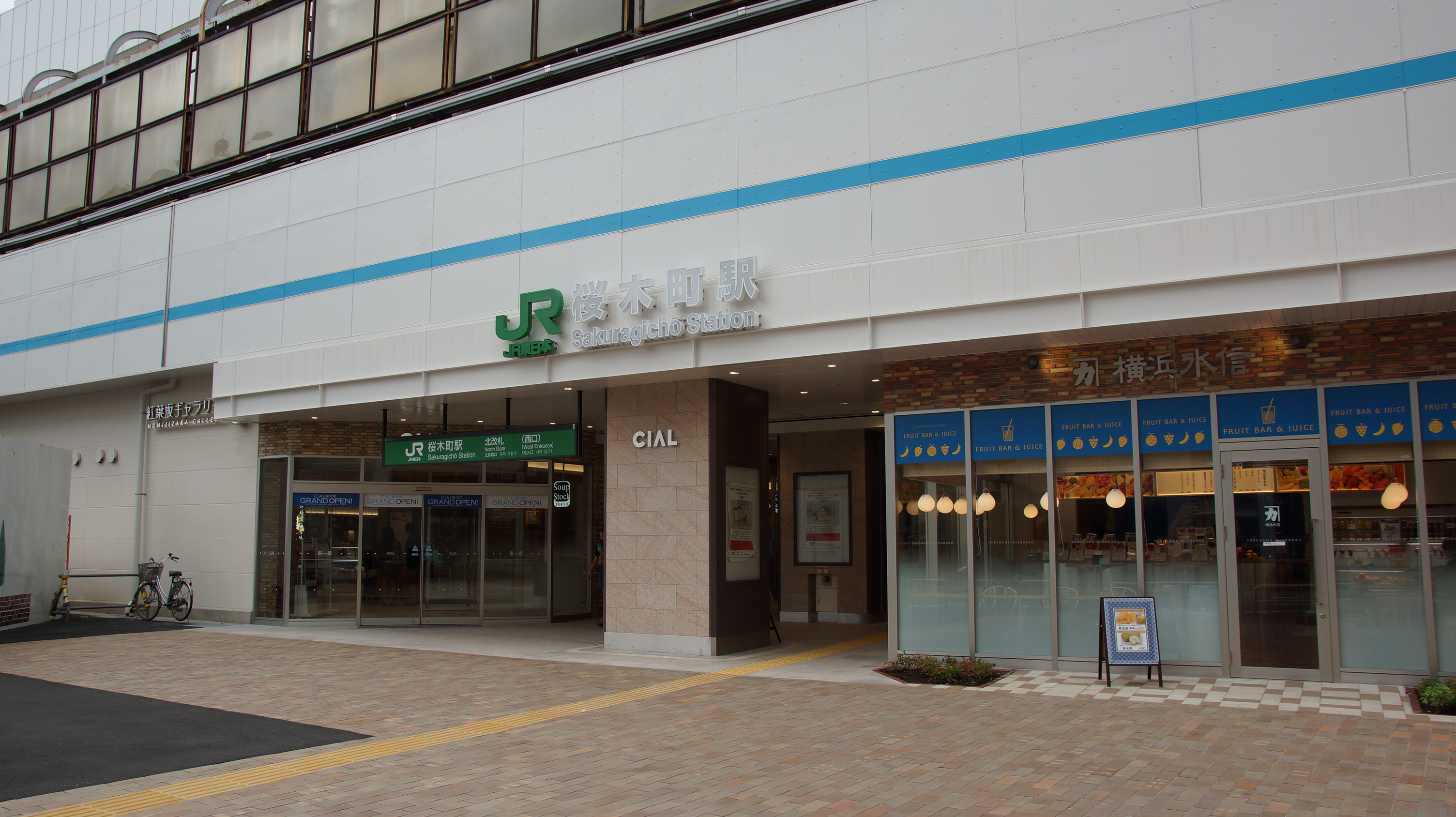
The north-west entrance, August 2014

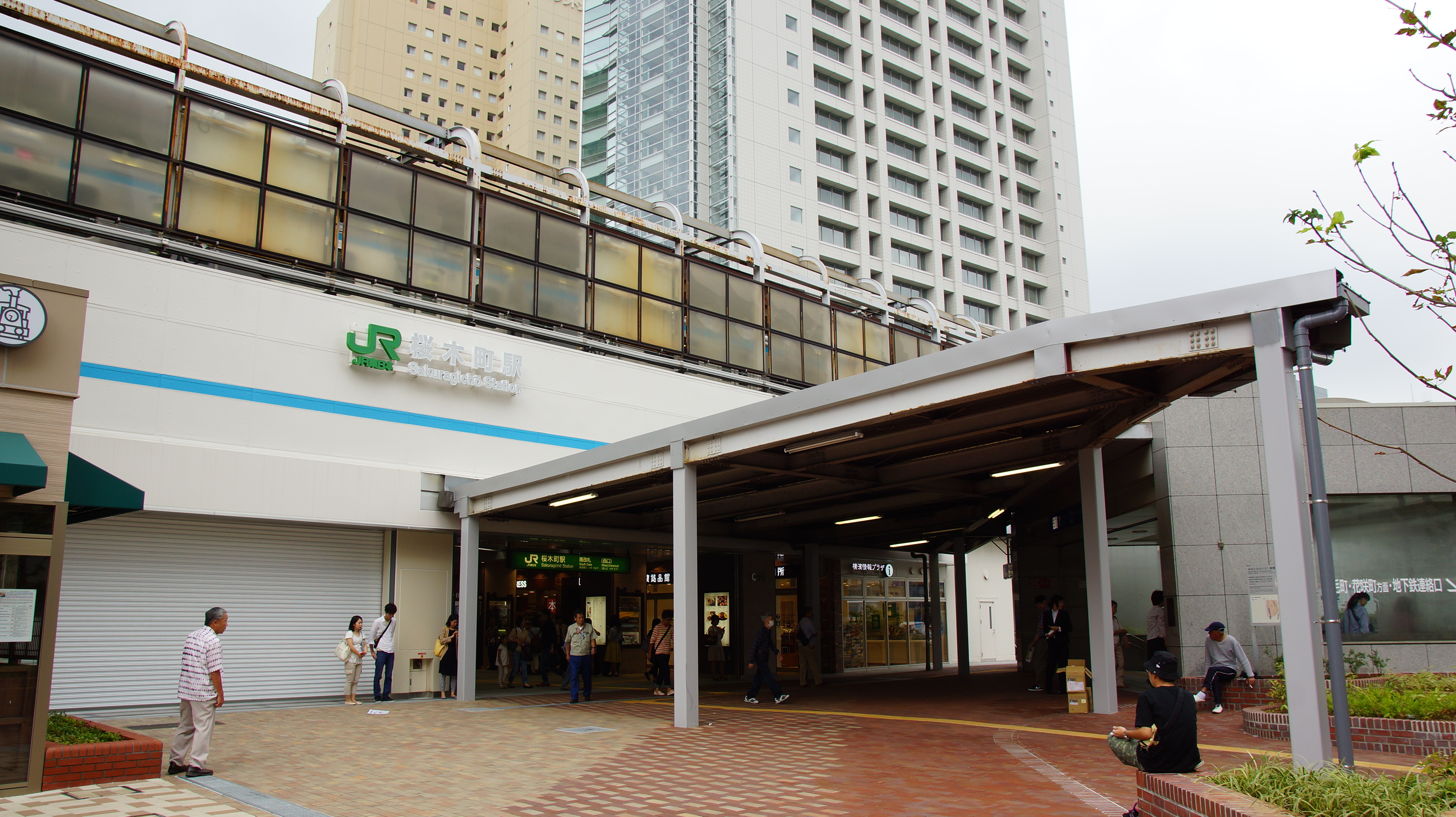
The south-west entrance, August 2014

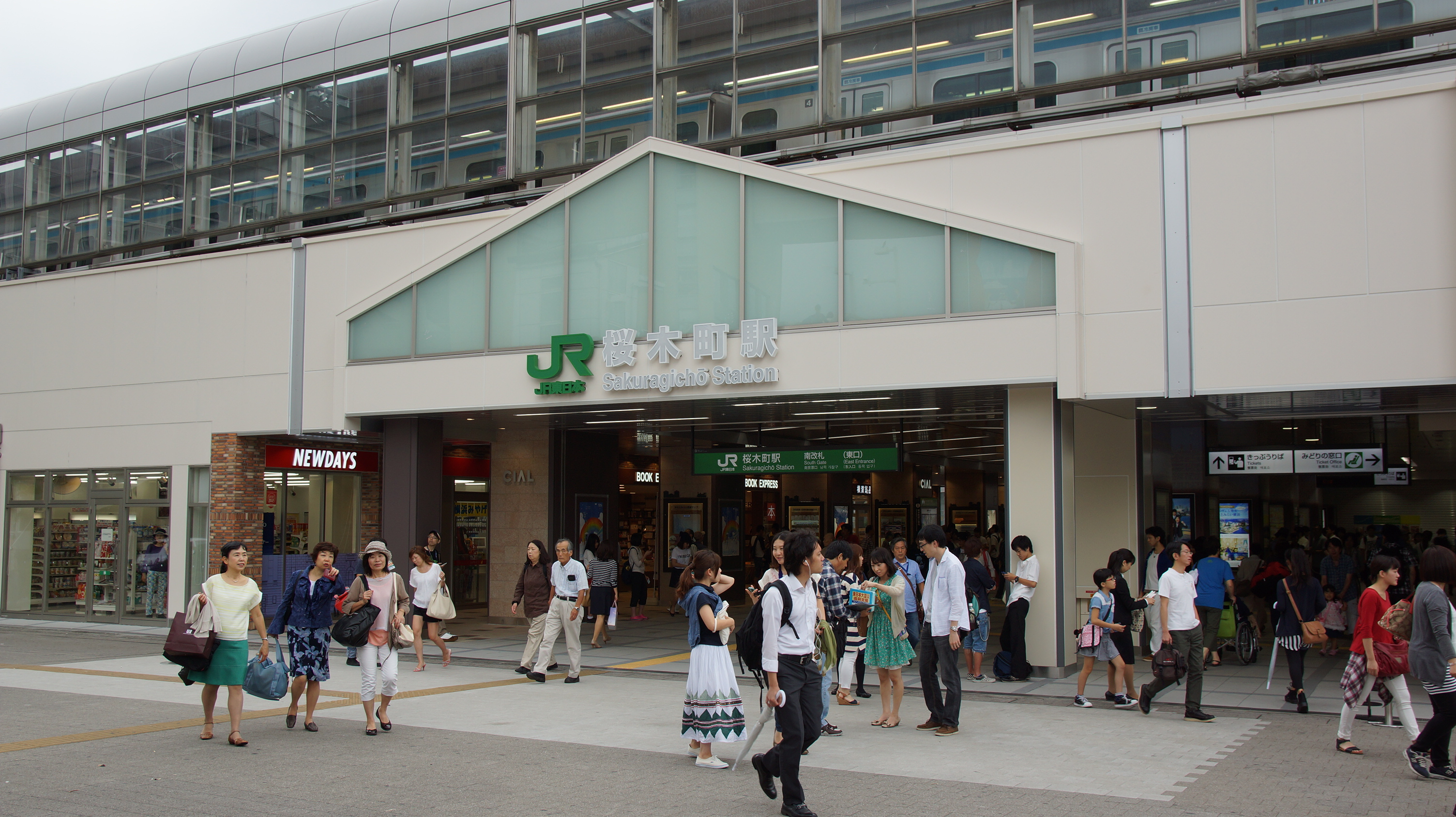
The south-east entrance, August 2014

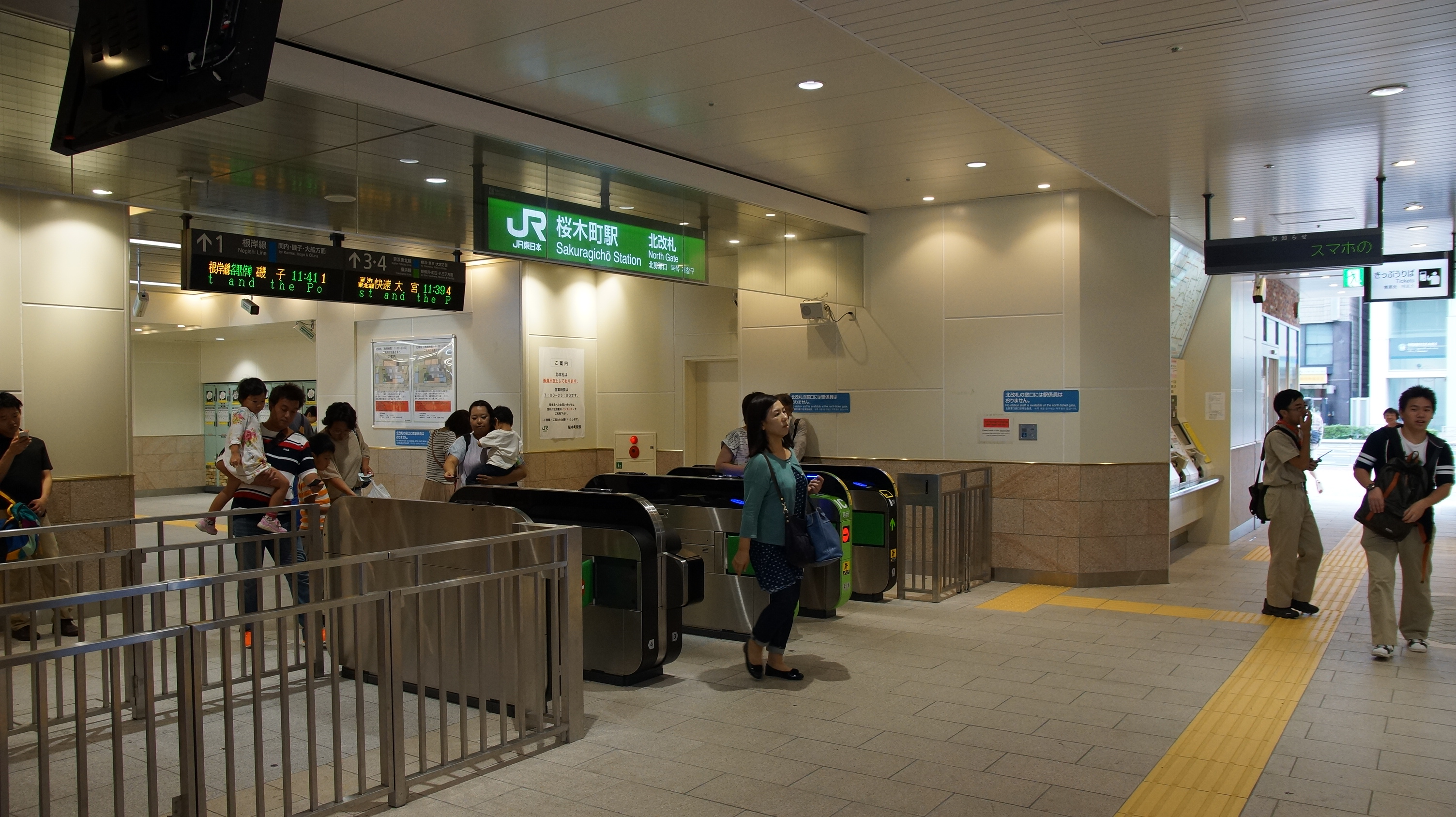
The north gate ticket barriers, August 2014

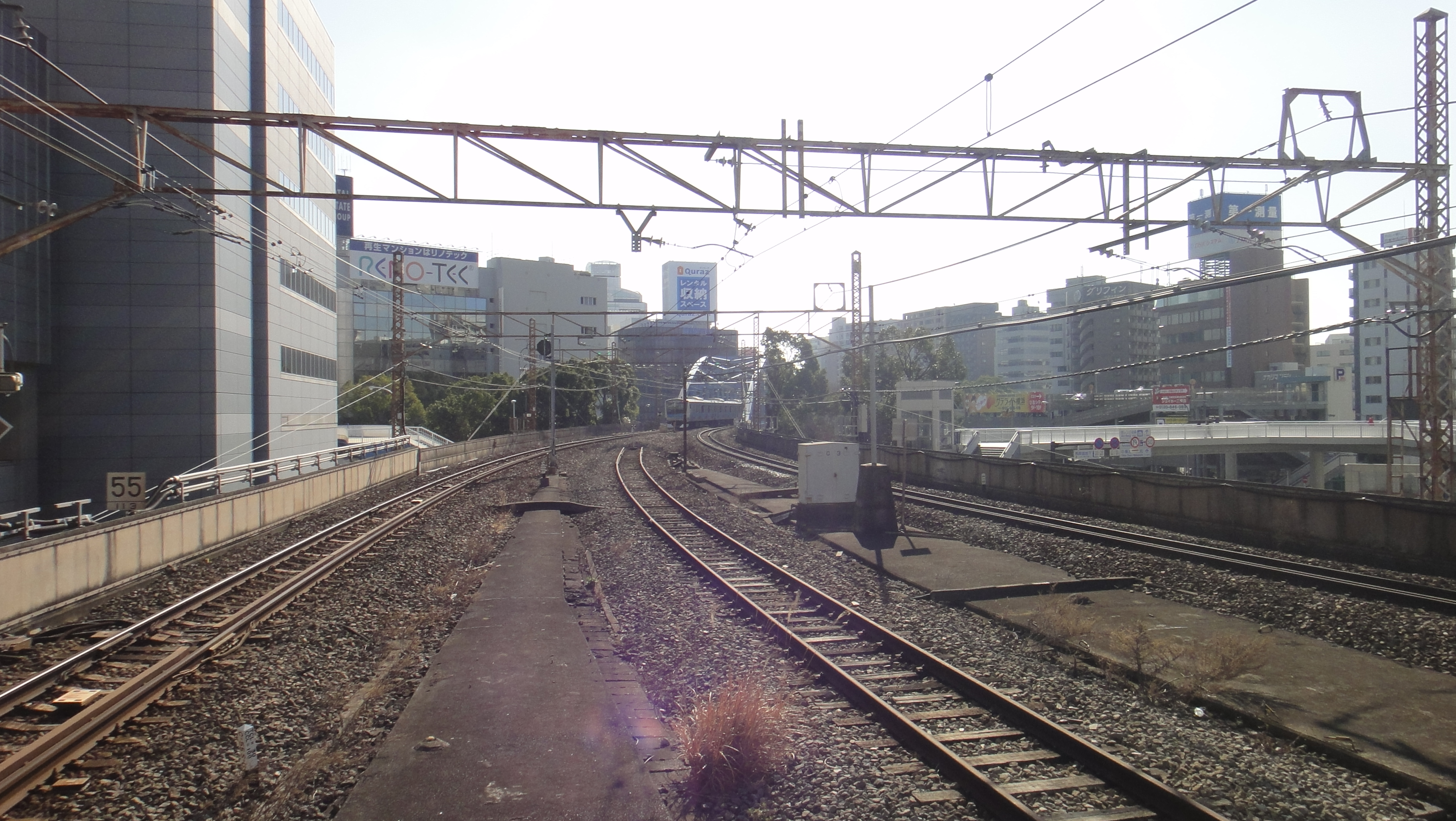
The view looking south from the end of platform 1/2 with the terminating middle track on the right, January 2015

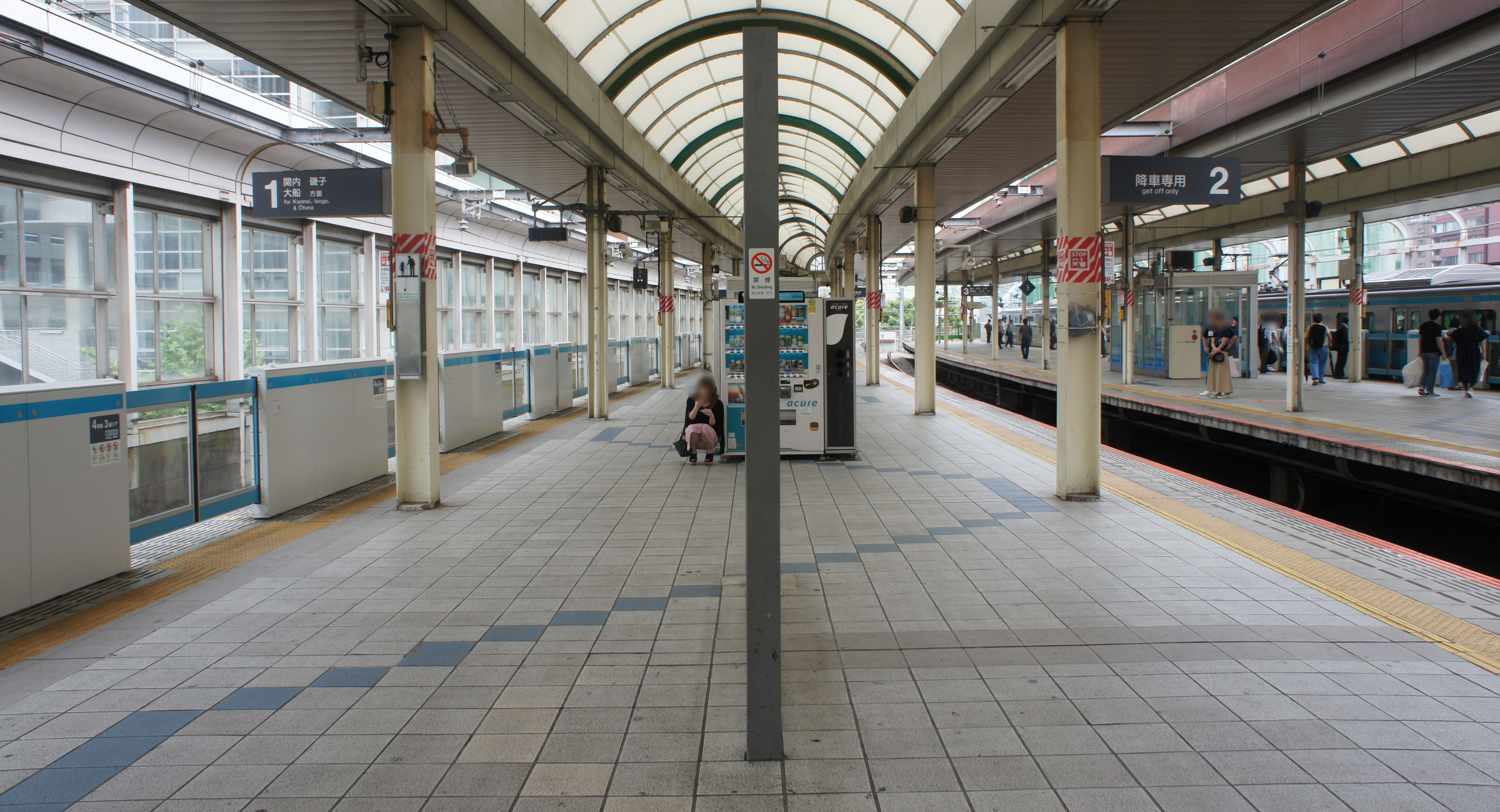
Platforms 1 and 2

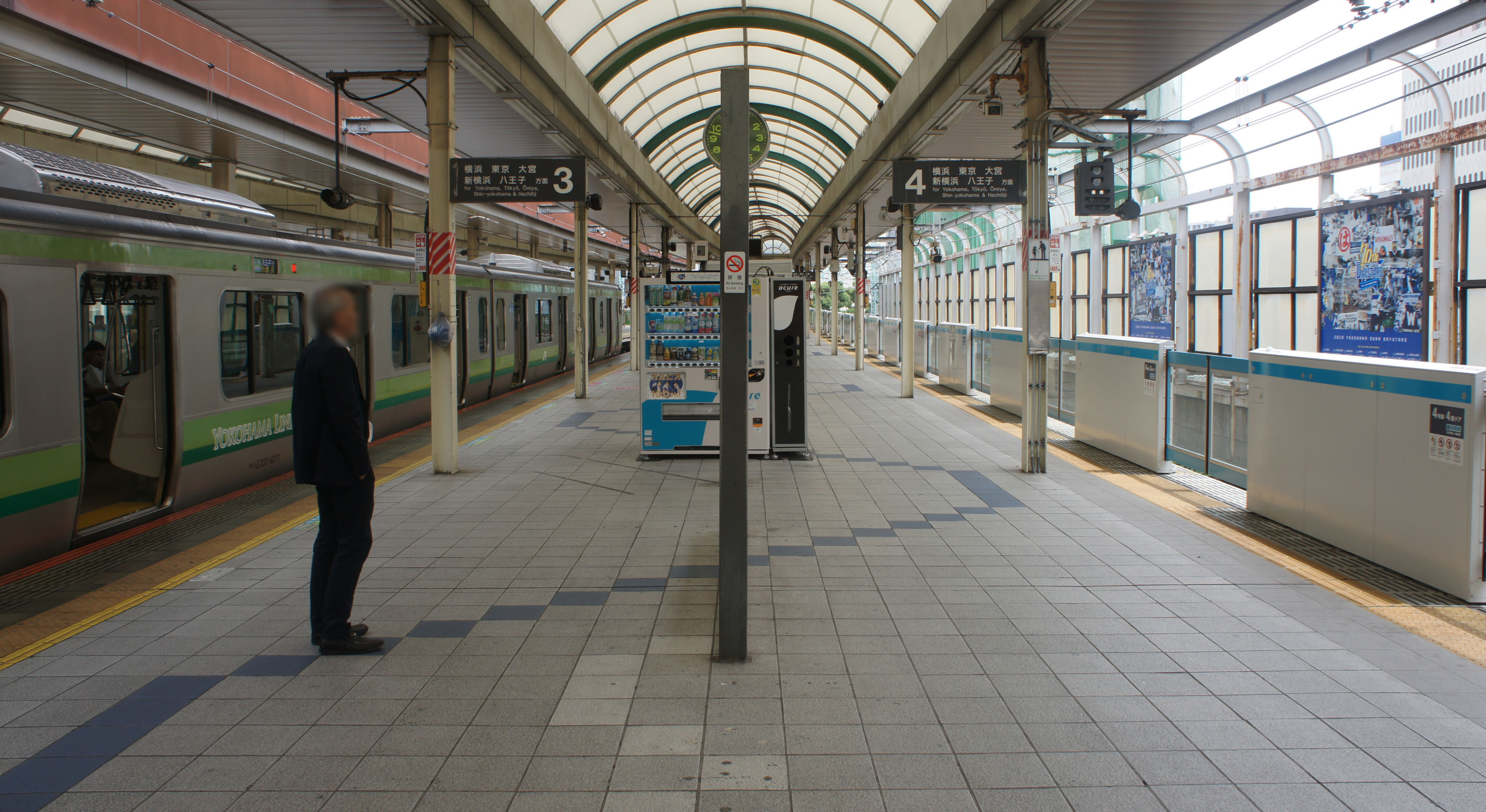
Platforms 3 and 4

=== Yokohama Municipal Subway ===
The Yokohama Municipal Subway (Blue Line) platforms are located on the 4th basement level, south of the main station.

1	■ Blue Line	for Kannai, Kamiōoka, Totsuka, and Shōnandai
2	■ Blue Line	for Yokohama, Shin-Yokohama, and Azamino

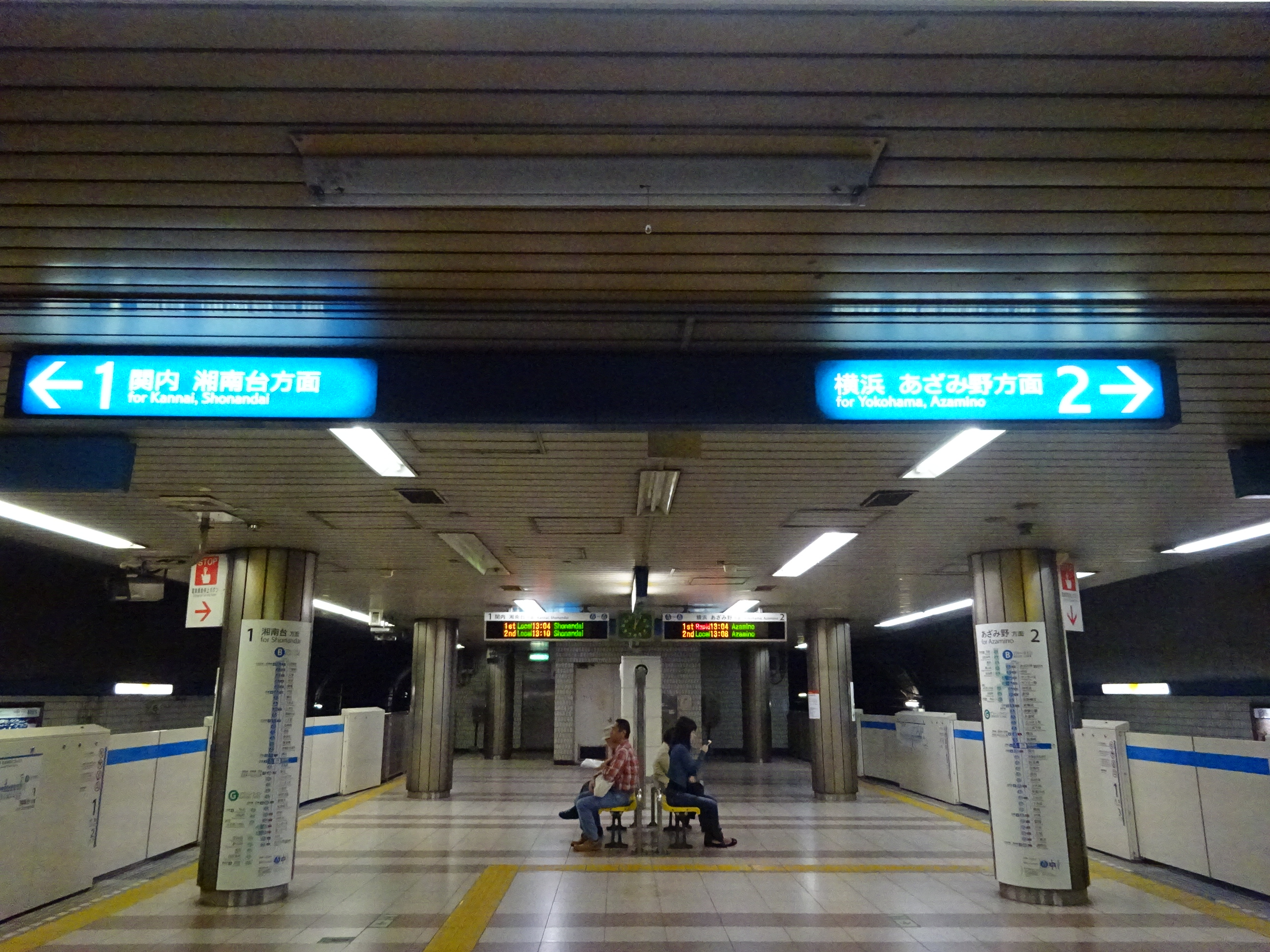
Platform

=== Yokohama Air Cabin ===
Located to the north is the Yokohama Air Cabin, a new type transportation in the urban area. The ropeway connects Sakuragichō Station with Unga Park where is located near Yokohama Red Brick Warehouse and Yokohama Cosmo World at 1000 yen from 22 April 2021. Senyo Kōgyō constructed the similar ropeway when Yokohama Exotic Showcase '89 was held in 1989.

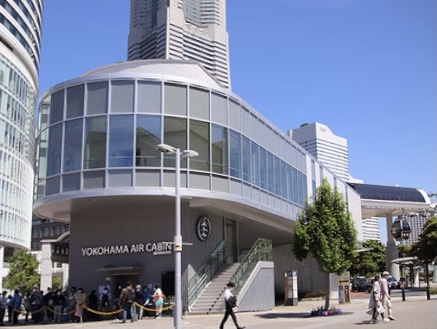
Yokohama Air Cabin Sakuragichō Station, 21 April 2021

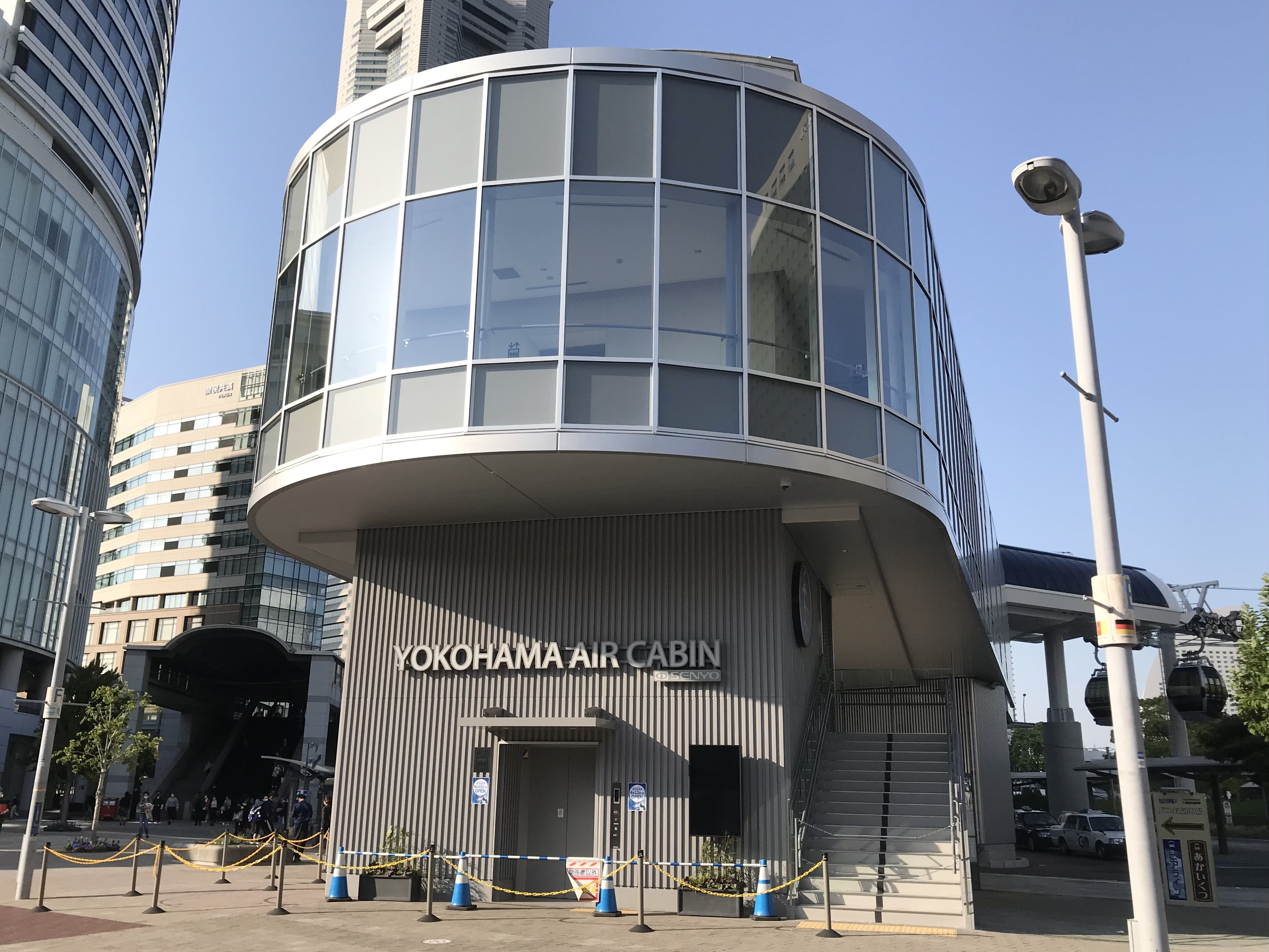
Yokohama Air Cabin Sakuragichō Station (21 April 2021)

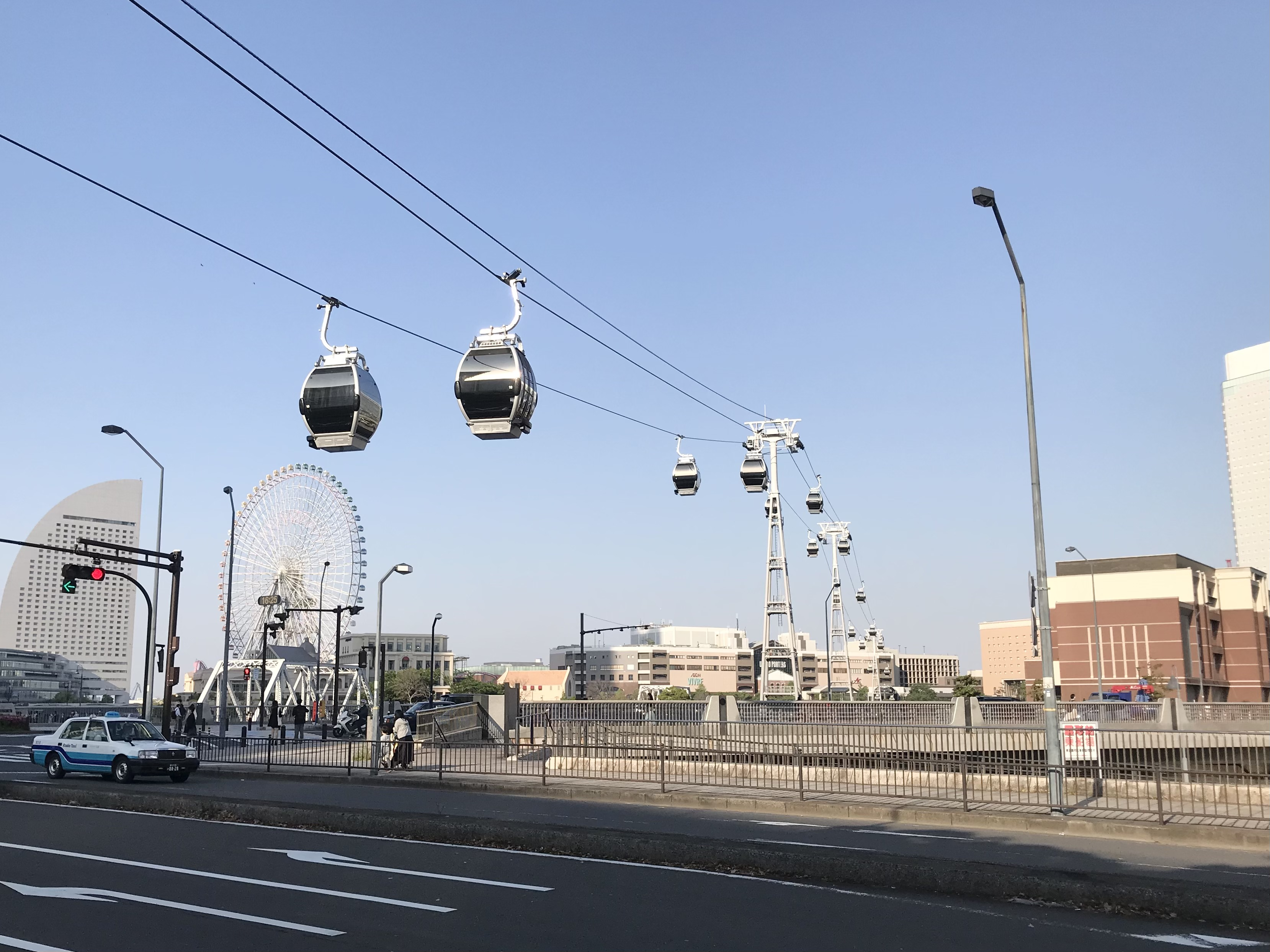
Yokohama Air Cabin above the road

== History ==
Sakuragichō is one of Japan's oldest stations. It opened on 12 June 1872, as the original Yokohama Station when the service between Shinagawa and Yokohama provisionally started. The station was renamed Sakuragichō Station on 15 August 1915, when the then-new and second Yokohama Station opened near Takashimachō Station. Yokohama Station was relocated again after the 1923 Great Kantō earthquake, to its third and current location.

Between 31 March 1932, and 30 January 2004, Sakuragichō Station was the terminus of the Tokyu Tōyoko Line.

The north gate ticket barriers were opened on 1 July 2014, with the passageway linking the east and west sides opened to the public on 16 July. A new commercial and shopping complex, called "Cial", adjoining the north side of the station was also opened at the same time.

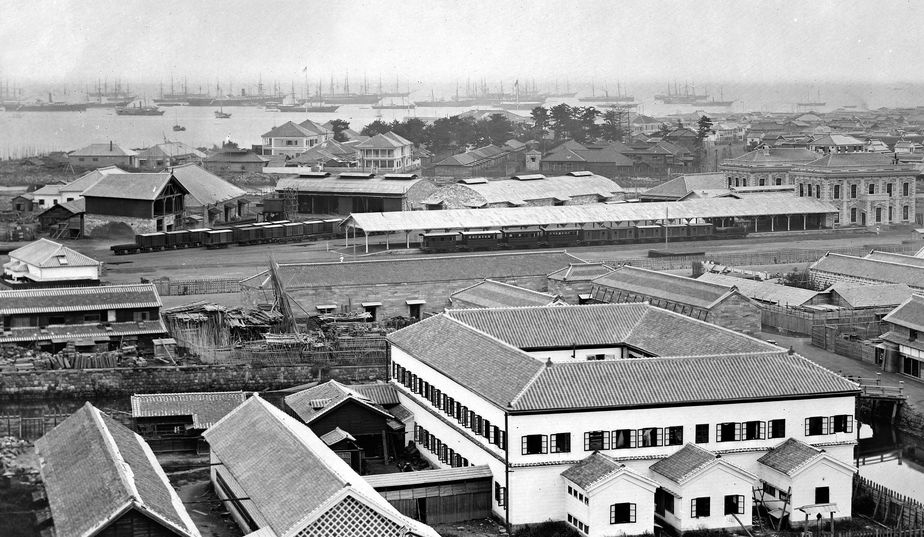
Yokohama Station in 1872

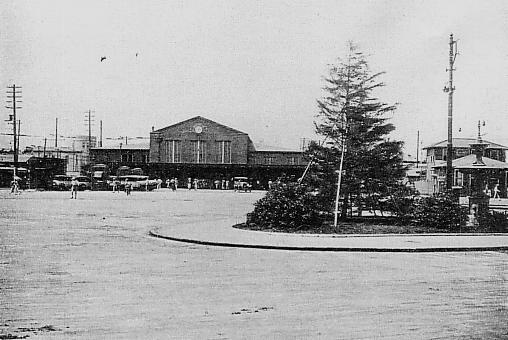
Sakuragicho Station circa 1930

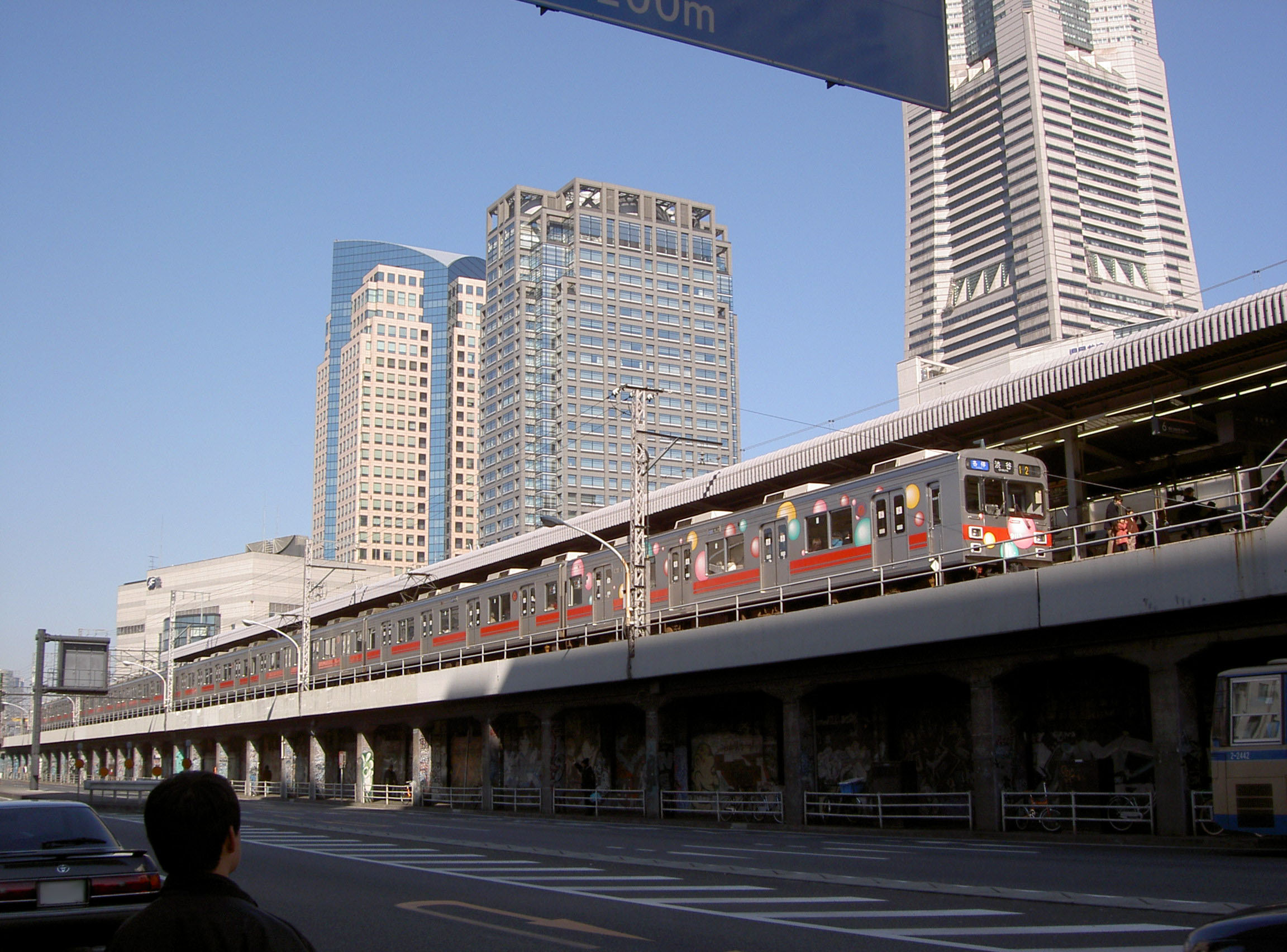
The former Tokyu Toyoko Line platforms in January 2004

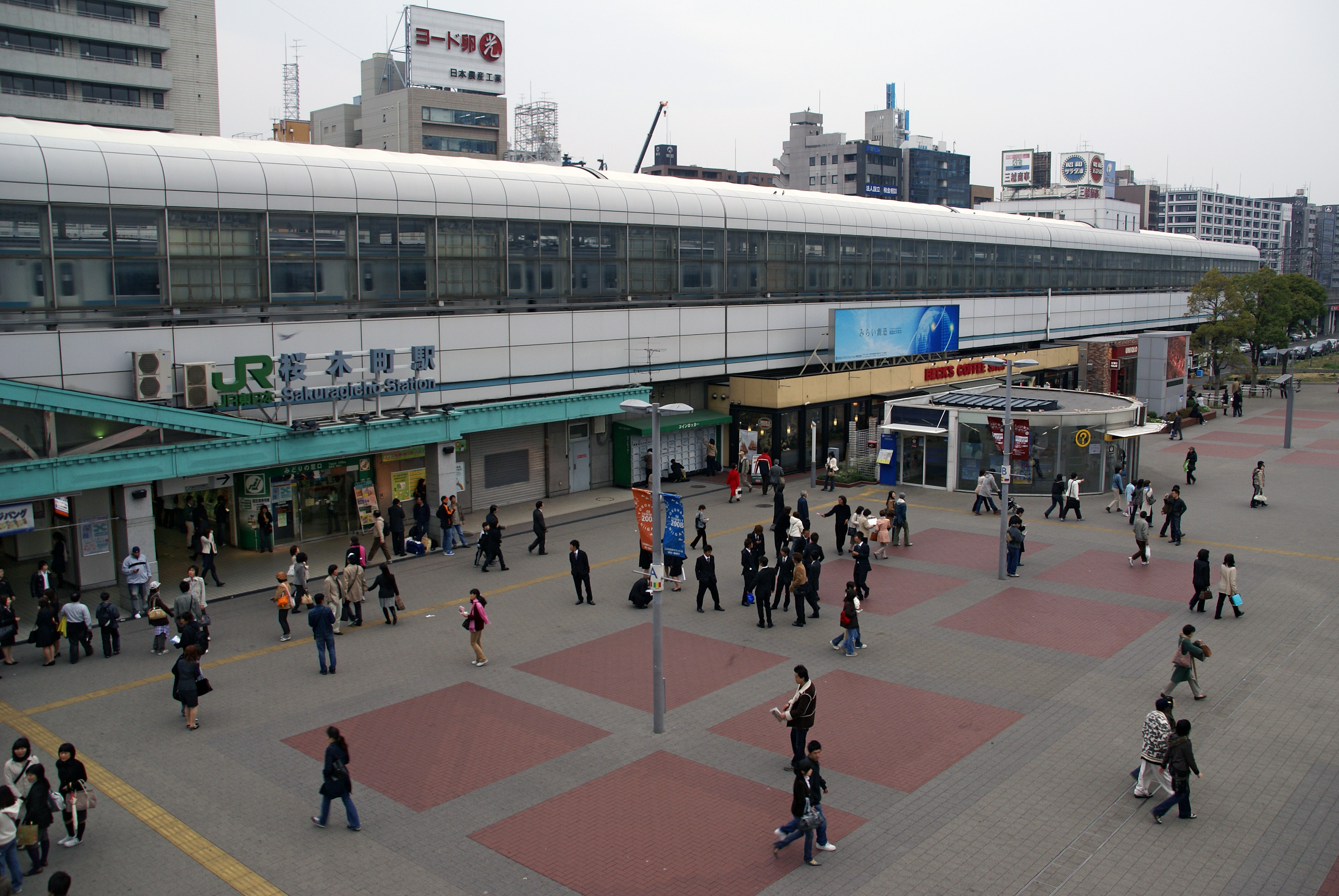
The east side of the station in 2007 before the addition of the north entrance

== Accidents ==
On 24 April 1951, a 63 series Keihin Line (now part of the Negishi Line) train approaching the station caught fire when the train hit a loose overhead wire and caused a short circuit. The fire killed 106 and injured 92.

== Passenger statistics ==
In fiscal 2019, the station was used by an average of 70,797 passengers daily (boarding passengers only). During the same period, the Yokohama Municipal Subway by an average of 19,767 passengers daily, (boarding passengers only).

The daily average passenger figures (boarding passengers only) for previous years are as shown below.

Fiscal year	JR East	Blue Line
2005	65,627	14,769
2010	61,536	15,483
2015	68,546	18,566

== Surrounding area ==
The station is located near the Minato Mirai 21 district and Yokohama Landmark Tower. Other stations in the vicinity include Minatomirai Station on the Minatomirai Line.

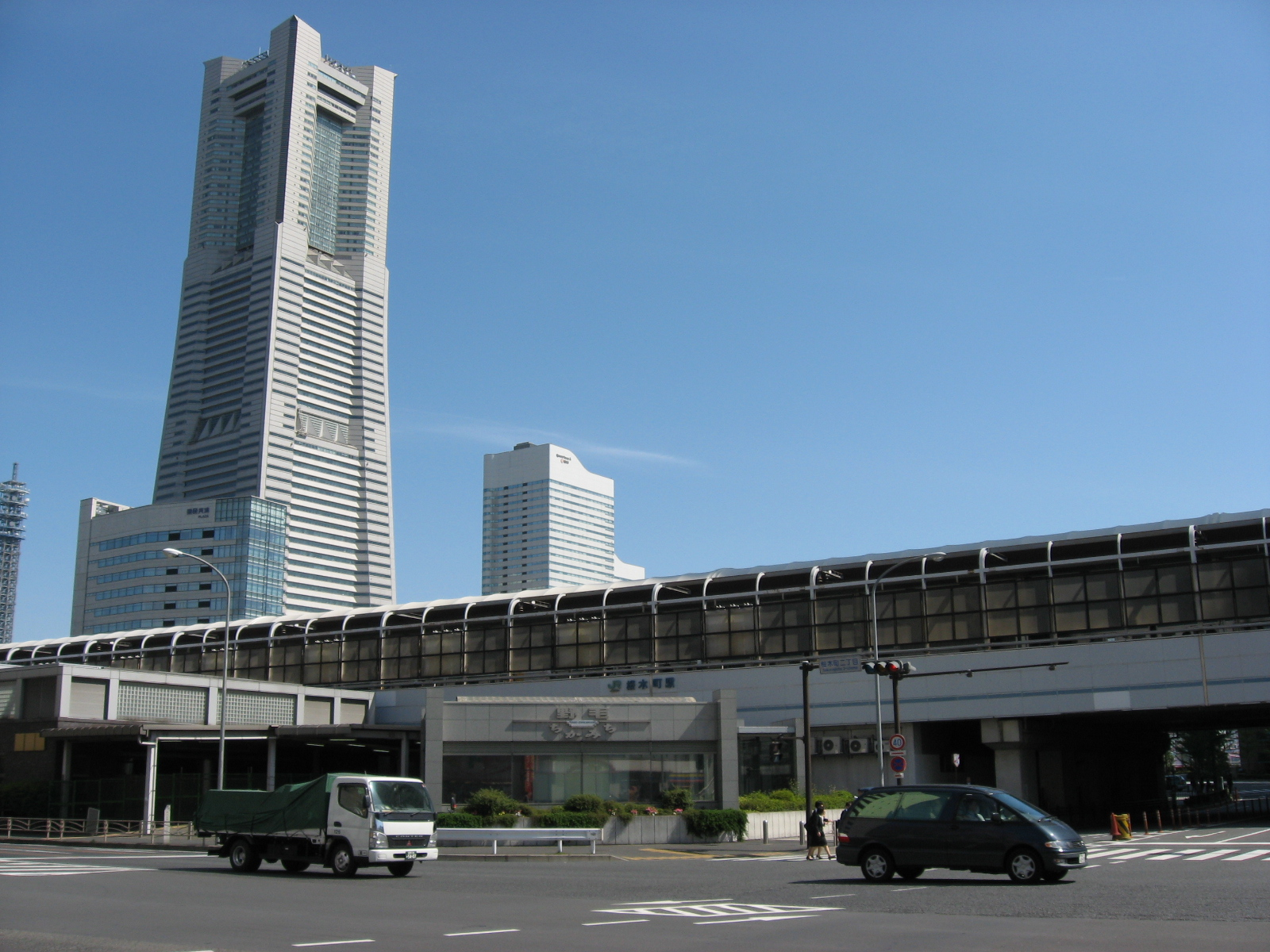
Sakuragicho Station with Yokohama Landmark Tower in the background, April 2007

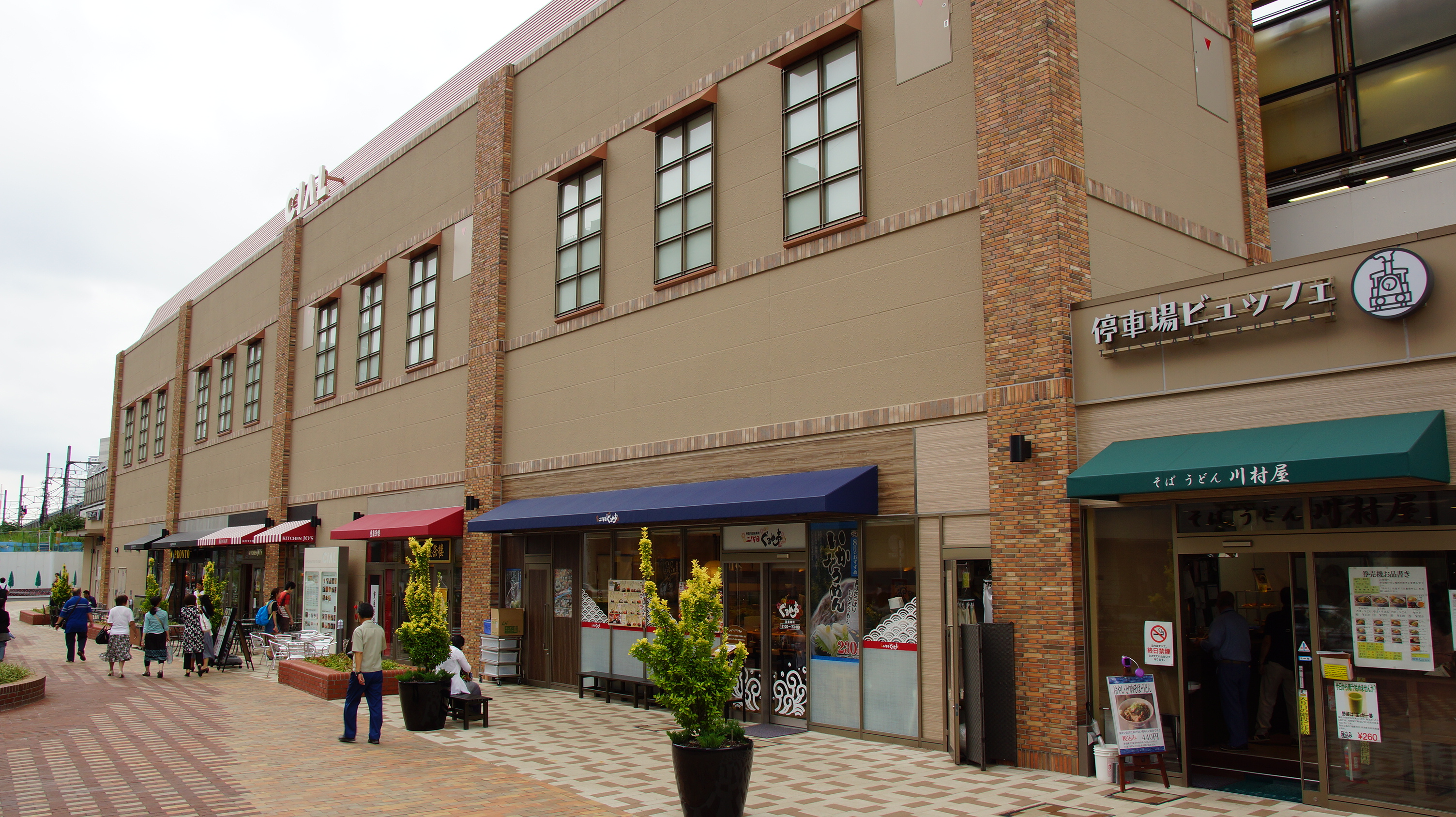
The west side of the station, August 2014

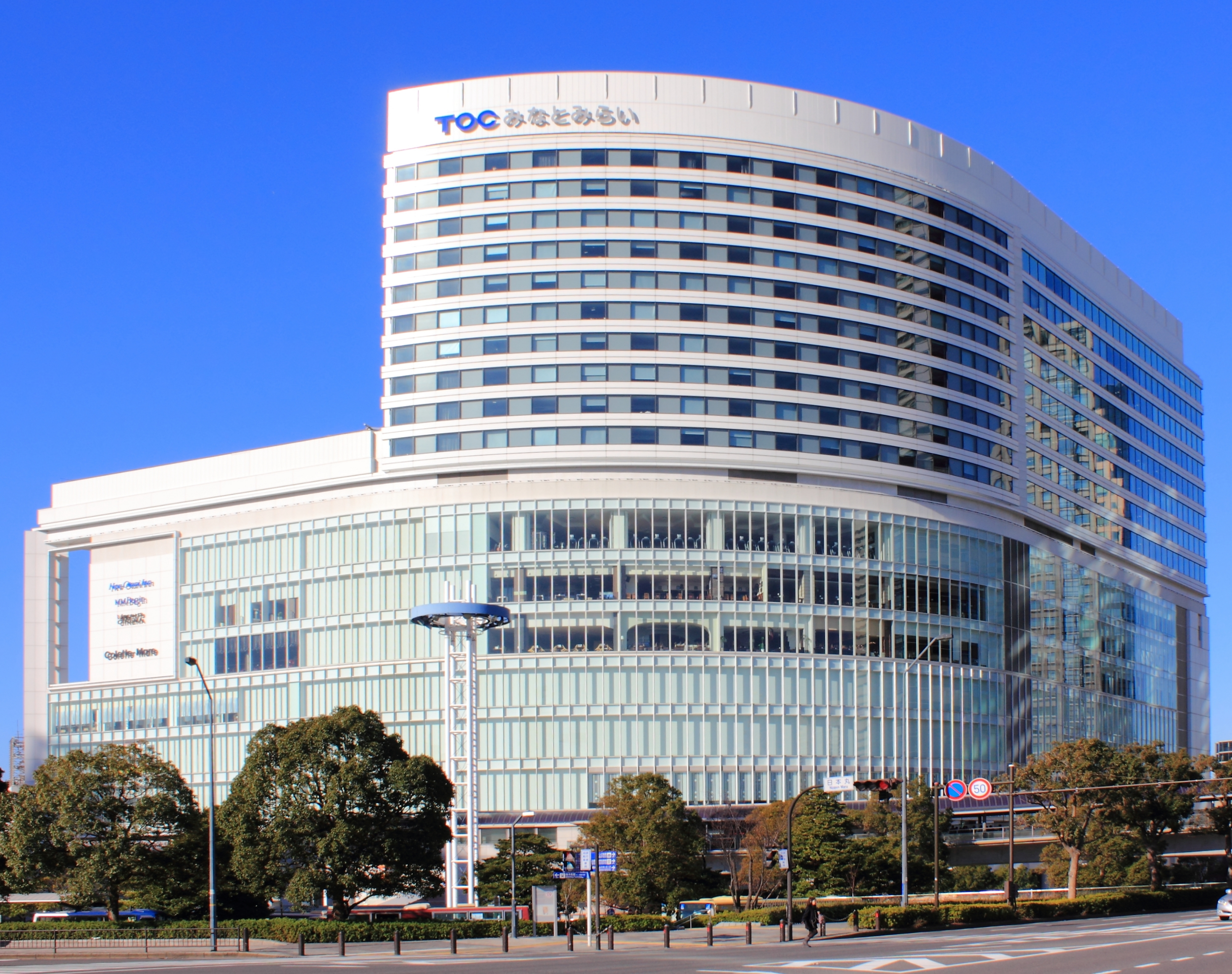
The TOC Minato Mirai building adjoining the station, February 2012

== See also ==
- List of railway stations in Japan
