= Yashima Gakuen University =

Distance learning university in Japan

Coordinates: 35°27′31″N 139°37′22″E

- 八洲学園大学; Yashima gakuen daigaku
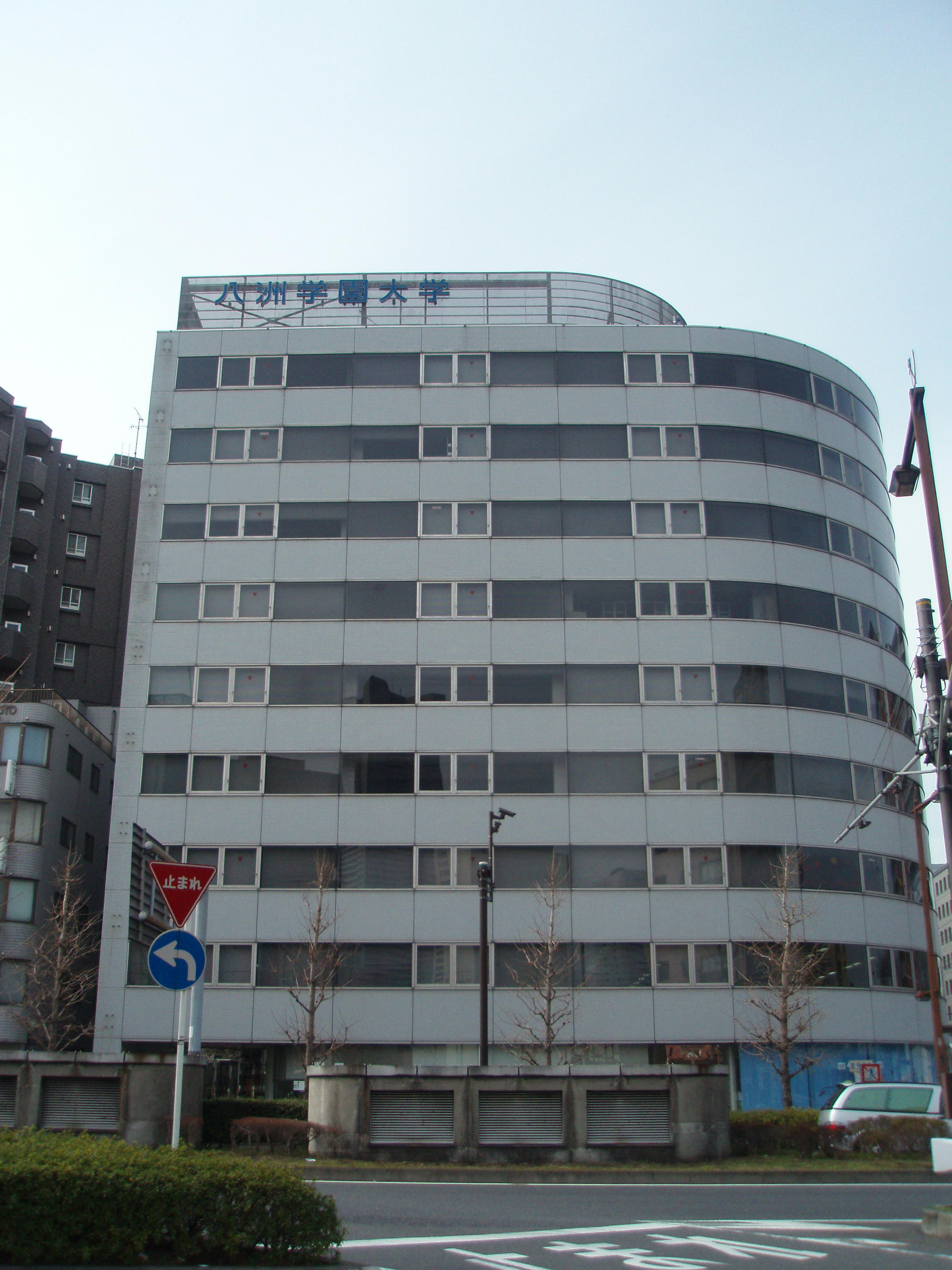
- Type: Private
- Established: 1966
- Location: Nishi-ku, Yokohama, Kanagawa, Japan
- Website: Official website

Yashima Gakuen University (八洲学園大学, Yashima gakuen daigaku) is a private distance learning university in Nishi-ku, Yokohama, Kanagawa Prefecture, Japan. It was established in 2004.
