= Yokohama Air Cabin =

Urban cableway in Yokohama, Kanagawa, Japan

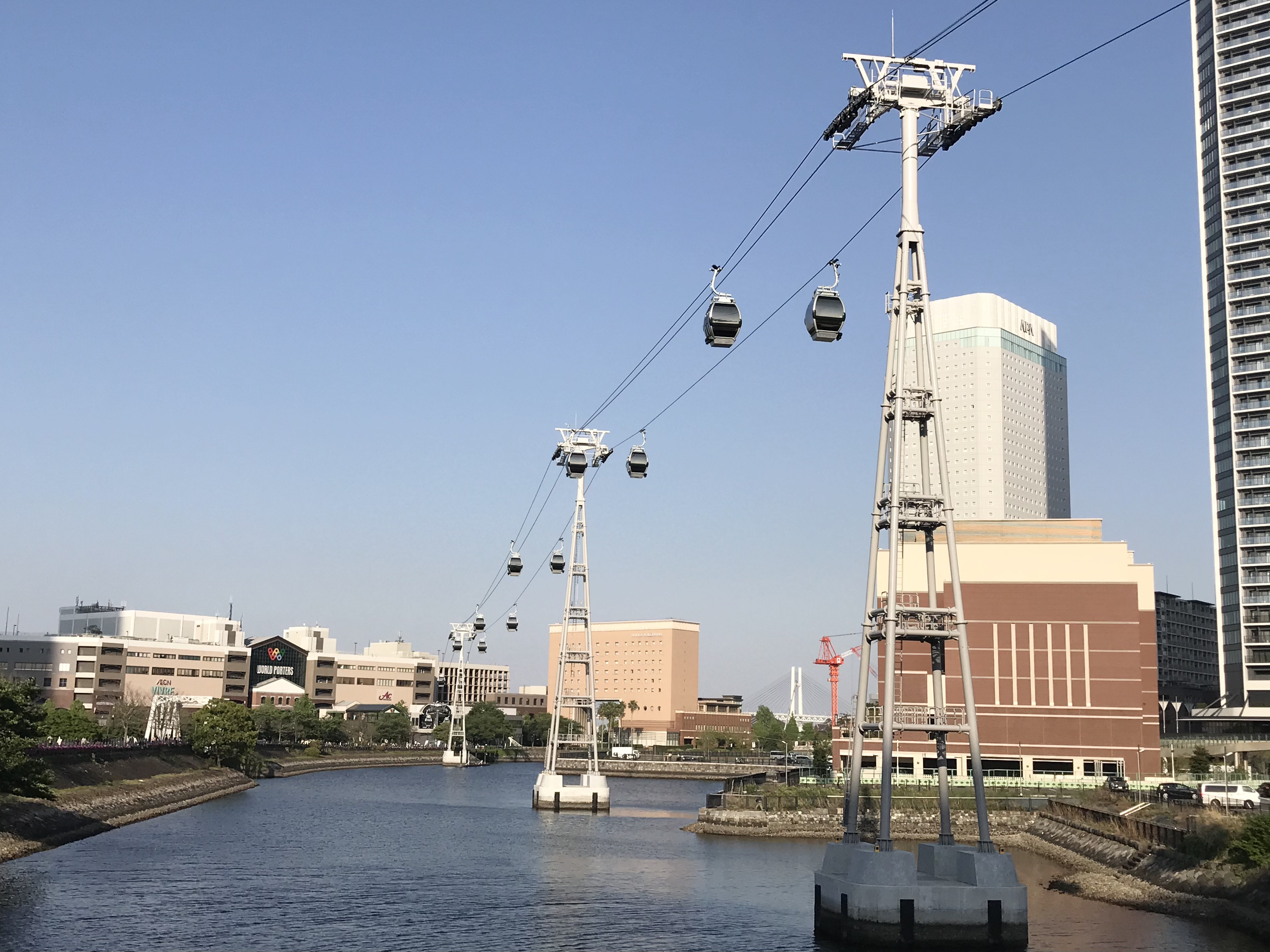
- Shown in 2021
- Interactive map of Yokohama Air Cabin

Overview
- Status: Operational
- Character: Urban
- System: Transport system
- Location: Yokohama, Kanagawa Prefecture
- Country: Japan
- Coordinates: 35.451389°N 139.631472°E
- Termini: Sakuragi-cho Station; Unga Park Station
- Elevation: lowest: 0 m (0 ft) highest: 40 m (130 ft)
- Construction begin: January 2020; 6 years ago
- Open: April 22, 2021; 5 years ago
- Website: yokohama-air-cabin.jp/

Operation
- Operator: Senyo Kogyo
- No. of carriers: 36
- Carrier capacity: 8
- Operating times: 10:00 — 22:00
- Headway: few seconds
- Trip duration: 5 min
- Fare: ¥ 1,000

Technical features
- Aerial lift type: Mono-cable gondola detachable
- Manufactured by: Nippon Cable, Japan
- Line length: 629 m (2,064 ft)
- No. of support towers: 5
- No. of cables: 1
- Operating speed: 2.5 m/s (8.2 ft/s)

Yokohama Air Cabin (Japanese: ヨコハマ・エア・キャビン) is a gondola lift that was opened in 2021 in Yokohama, Kanagawa Prefecture, Japan. It connects to Sakuragichō Station and Yokohama Cosmo World. The system is 629 m (2,064 ft) long and has an elevation of 40 m (130 ft).

== Gallery ==
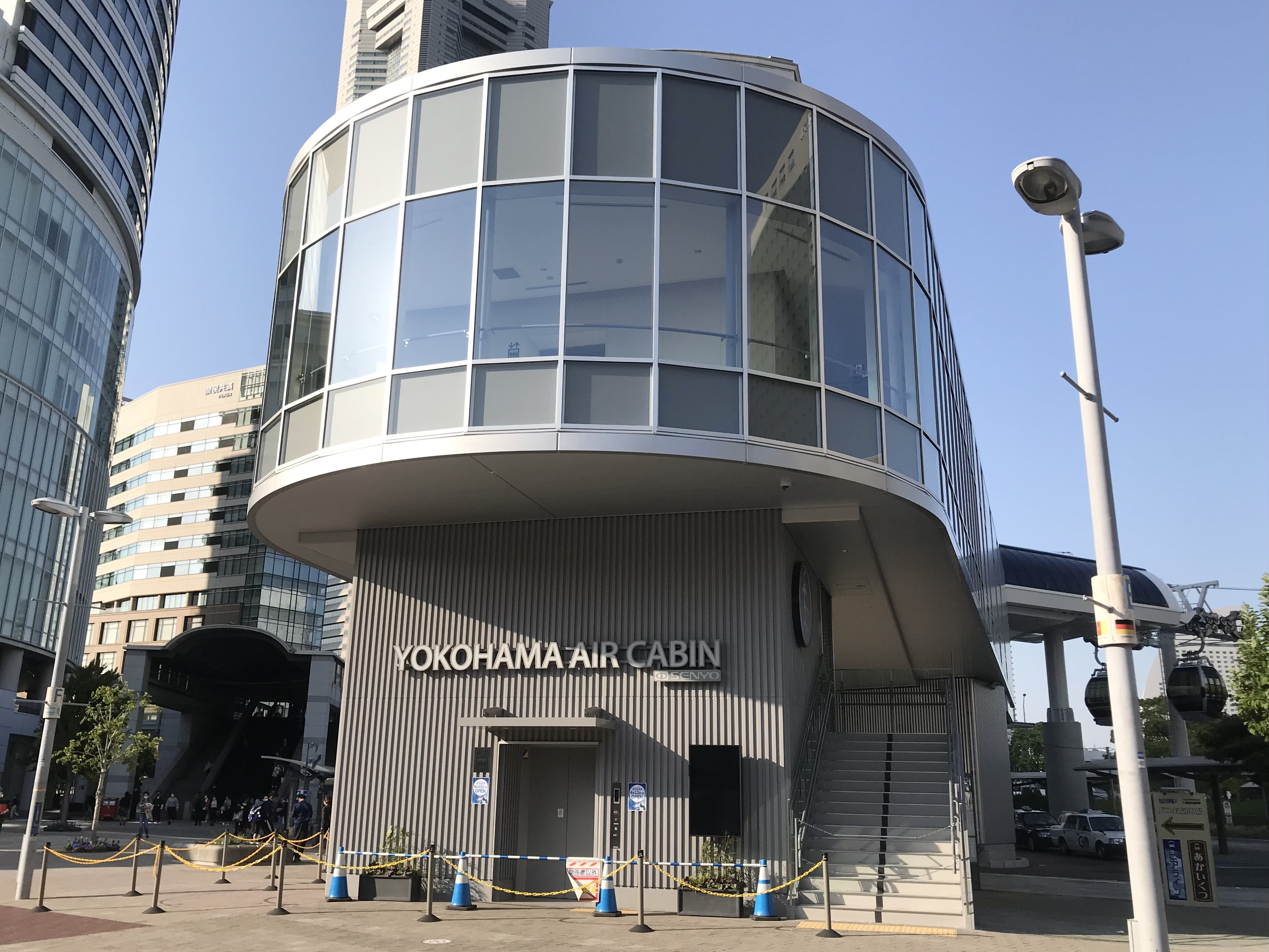
Sakuragi-cho Station (2021)

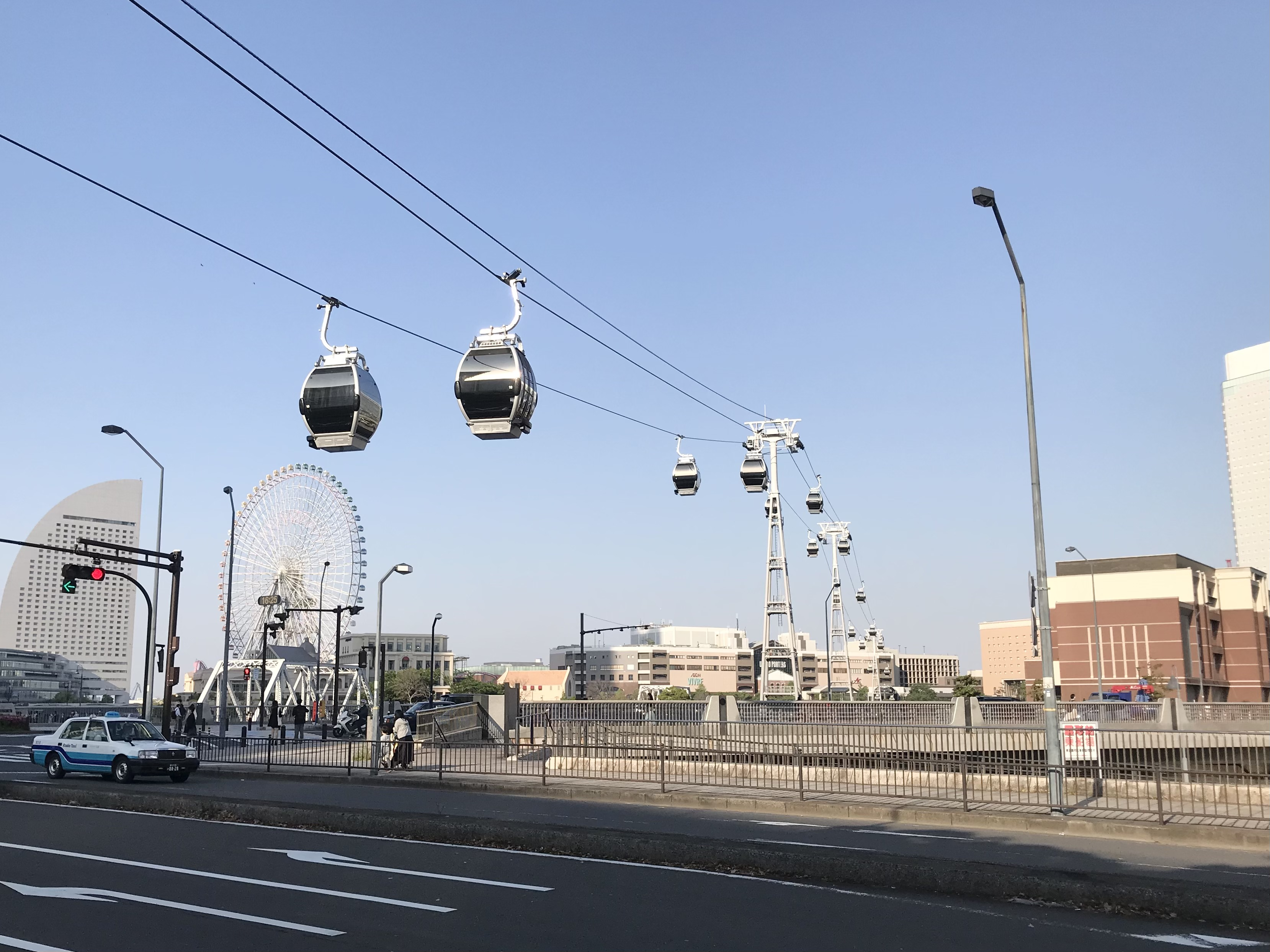
Yokohama Air Cabin above the road

Various views of Yokohama Air Cabin

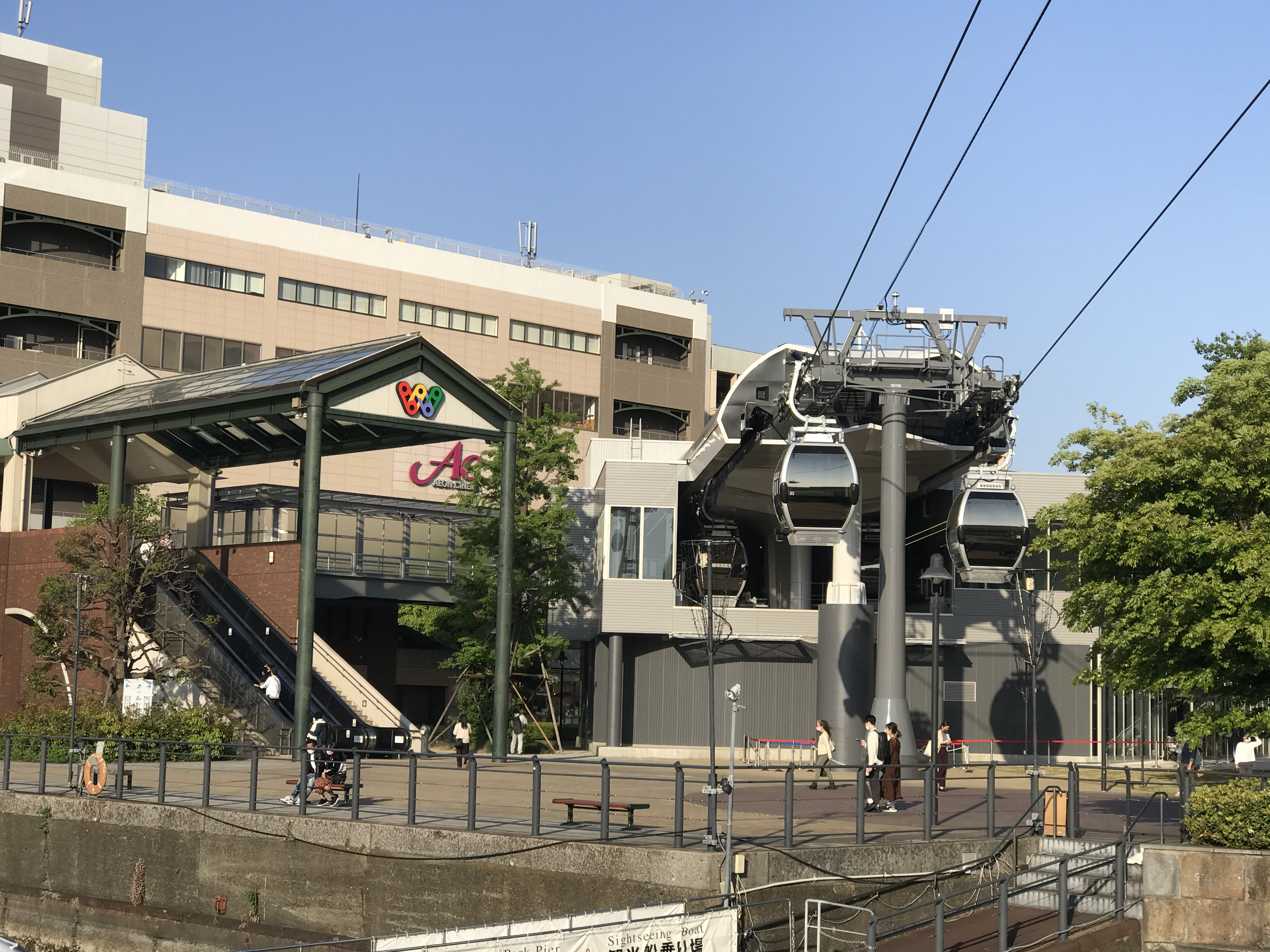
Unga Park Station building connects to Yokohama World Porters (2021)

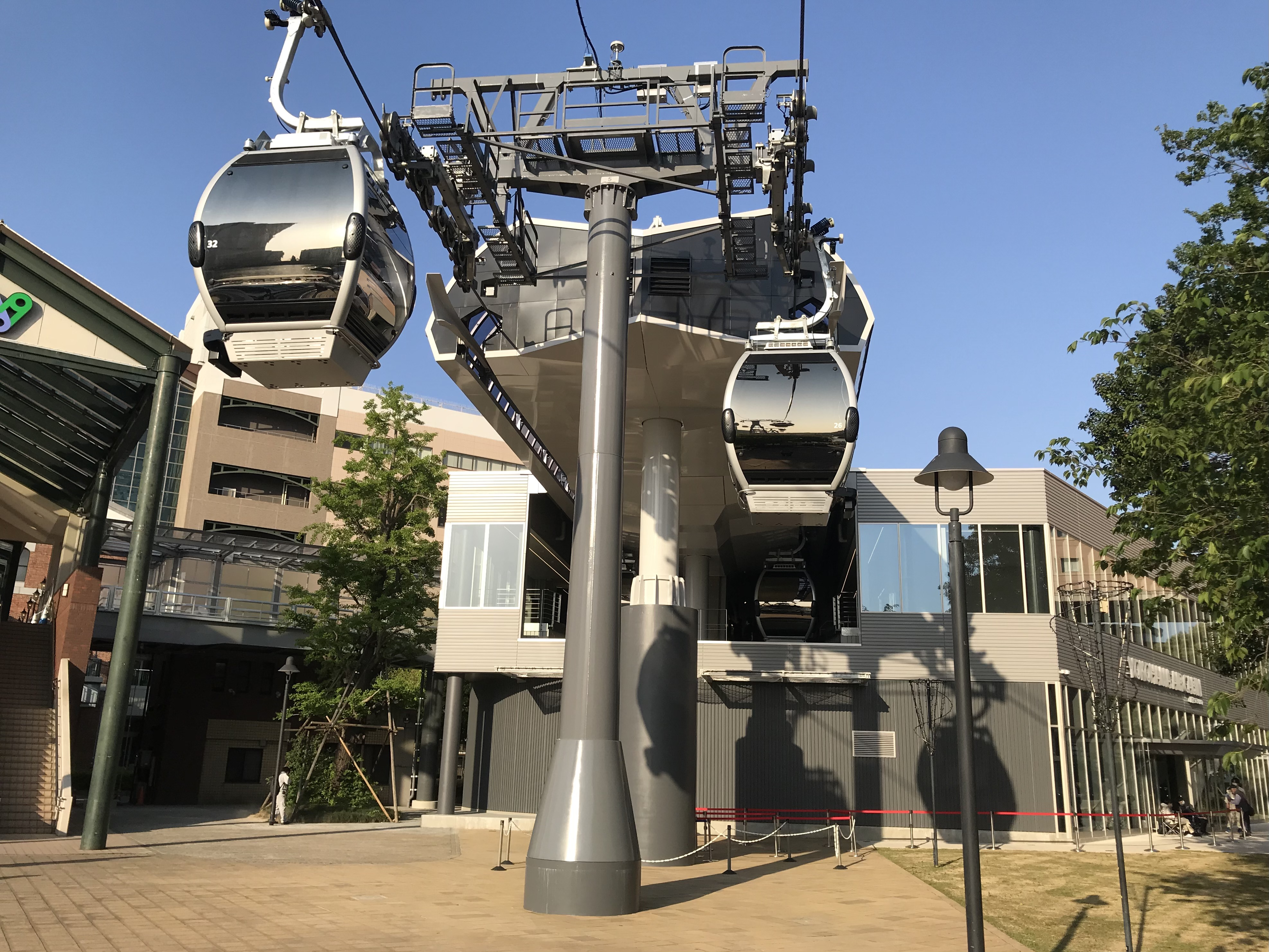
Near Unga Park Station (2021)

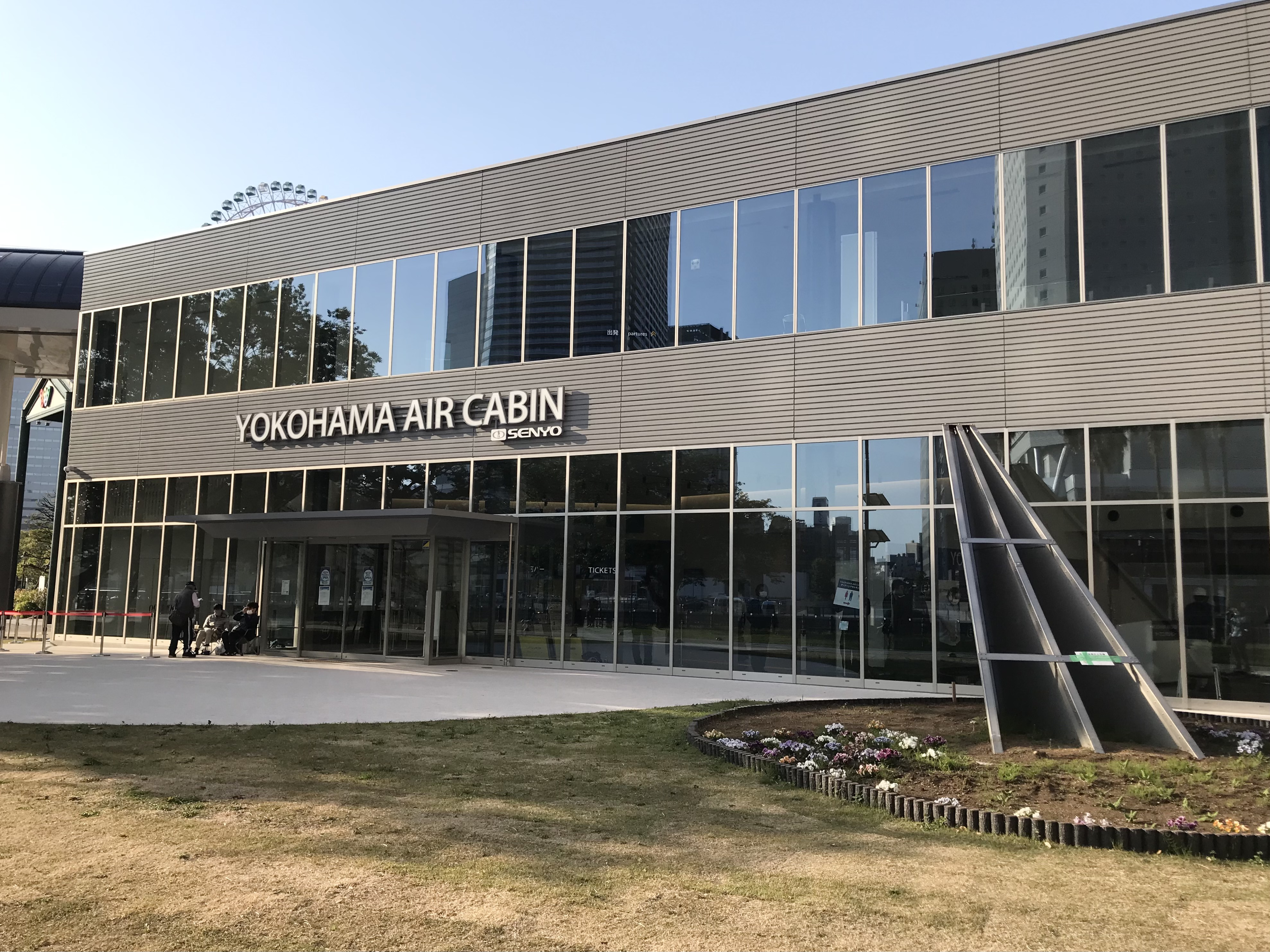
Unga Park Station building (2021)

== See also ==
- Yokohama Cosmo World
- Senyo Kogyo
- Nippon Cable
