= Nishi-ku, Yokohama =

Nishi 西区
- Ward
- Nishi Ward
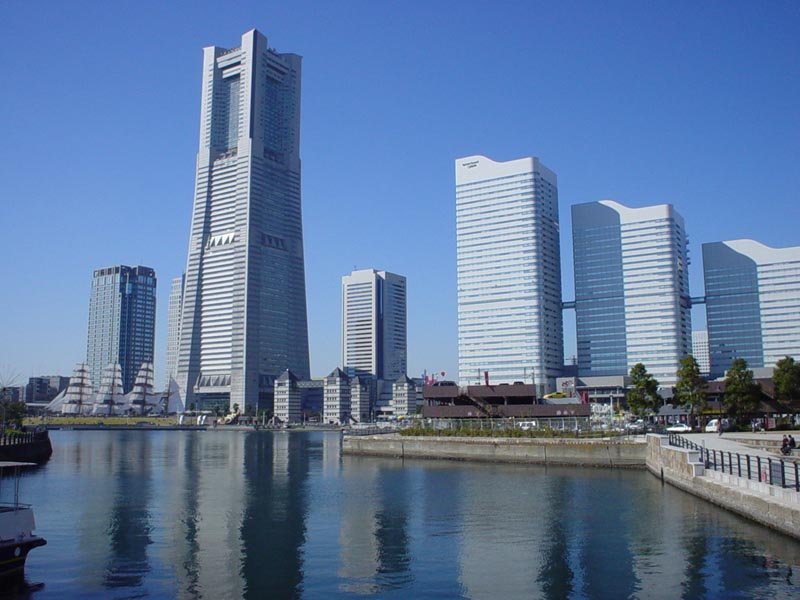
- Minato Mirai 21, with Landmark Tower second from the left

- Flag

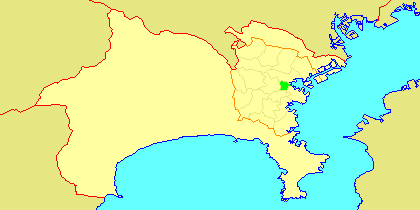
- Location of Nishi in Kanagawa

- Nishi (Japan)
- Coordinates: 35°27′13″N 139°37′1″E
- Country: Japan
- Region: Kantō
- Prefecture: Kanagawa
- City: Yokohama

Area
  - Total: 7.04 km^{2} (2.72 sq mi)

Population (February 2010)
  - Total: 93,210
  - Density: 13,210/km^{2} (34,200/sq mi)
- Time zone: UTC+9 (Japan Standard Time)
- Tree: Osmanthus
- Flower: Narcissus
- Address: 1-5-10 Chuo, Nishi-ku Yokohama-shi, Kanagawa-ken; 220-0051
- Website: Nishi Ward Office

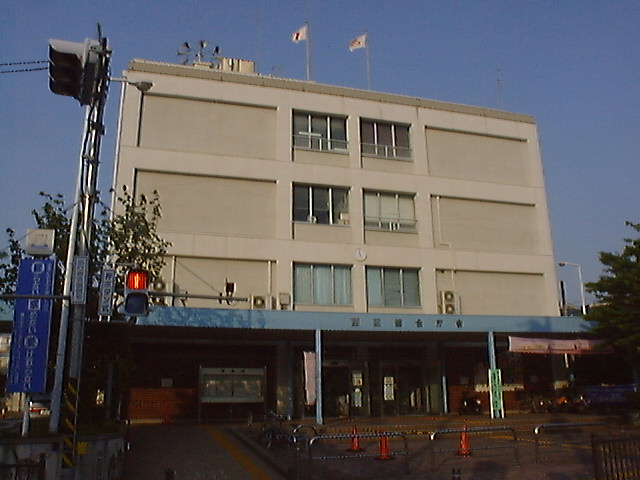
Nishi Ward Office

Nishi-ku (西区) is one of the 18 wards of the city of Yokohama in Kanagawa Prefecture, Japan. As of 2010, the ward had an estimated population of 93,027 and a density of 13,210 persons per km^{2}. The total area was 7.04 km^{2}.

== Geography ==
Nishi Ward is located in eastern Kanagawa Prefecture, near the geographic center of the city of Yokohama. It is the smallest of the wards of the city in terms of area, but it includes Yokohama's major commercial hub, extending from the Yokohama Station area through the new Minato Mirai 21 complex, which is home to the Yokohama Landmark Tower, the second tallest building in Japan. The ward consists of lowlands through which the Tōkaidō Main Line and Route 1 pass. The northernmost, southernmost, and western areas are uplands. The Minato Mirai complex is built on reclaimed land, as was the Yokohama Station area..

=== Surrounding municipalities ===
- Hodogaya Ward
- Kanagawa Ward
- Naka Ward
- Minami Ward

== History ==
Part of the domains of the Miura clan during and after the Kamakura period, the area of present-day Nishi Ward was part of the tenryō territory in Musashi Province controlled directly by the Tokugawa shogunate, but administered through various hatamoto or direct retainers of the shōgun. Parts of the territories of Kanagawa-juku and Hodogaya-juku, post stations on the Tōkaidō are within the borders of the present Ward. After the Meiji Restoration, the area was divided between the new Tachibana and Kuraki Districts in Kanagawa Prefecture and further divided into numerous villages. Yokohama's wards were established on October 10, 1927, with this area becoming part of the Kanagawa and Naka Wards. On April 1, 1944, Nishi became an independent ward within the city of Yokohama.

== Economy ==
Nishi Ward is a regional commercial center and the main business district of modern Yokohama. The world headquarters of Nissan is located in Nishi Ward. Other major companies headquartered in the ward include:

- JGC Corporation
- Sagami Railway
- Okamura Corporation
- Kiyoken Co. Ltd.
- Ebara Foods Industry
- Computer System Engineering Co., Ltd.
- Chiyoda Corporation
- NYK Cruises (Asuka Cruise), a subsidiary of Nippon Yusen Kaisha (NYK), located in Yokohama Landmark Tower

Japan Airlines at one time operated a domestic flights only ticketing facility in the Sky Building of the Yokohama City Air Terminal (YCAT) in Nishi-ku. On March 31, 2011, the ticket counter closed.

== Transportation ==
=== Railroads ===
- East Japan Railway Company – Tōkaidō Main Line, Yokosuka Line, Shonan-Shinjuku Line, Keihin-Tōhoku Line, Negishi Line, Yokohama Line
  - Yokohama
- Keihin Electric Express Railway - Keikyū Main Line
  - Yokohama - Tobe
- Tokyu Corporation - Tōkyū Tōyoko Line
  - Yokohama
- Sagami Railway - Sagami Railway Main Line
  - Yokohama - Hiranumabashi - Nishi-Yokohama
- Yokohama Minatomirai Railway Company – Minatomirai Line
  - Yokohama –Shin-Takashima –Minatomirai
- Yokohama City Transportation Bureau – Blue Line
  - Yokohama – Takashimachō

=== Highways ===
- Shuto Expressway Kanagawa No. 1
- Shuto Expressway Kanagawa No. 2
- Routes 1
- Route 16

==== Prefecture roads ====
- Kanagawa Prefecture Road 13

=== Ferry ===
- The Port Service

== Education ==
Three universities are located in Nishi Ward. The oldest is Yokohama National University, established in 1876. KU Port Square, part of the private Kanagawa University, established in 1928, lies within the ward. The third is Yashima Gakuen University.

Kanagawa Prefectural Board of Education operates Yokohama-Hiranuma Senior High School.

The Yokohama Municipal Board of Education operates public elementary and junior high schools.

Junior high schools:

- Karuizawa (軽井沢)
- Nishi (西)
- Oimatsu (老松)
- Okano (岡野)

Elementary schools:

- Azuma (東)
- Hiranuma (平沼)
- Inaridai (稲荷台)
- Ipponmatsu (一本松)
- Minato Mirai Honcho (みなとみらい本町)
- Miyagaya (宮谷)
- Nishimae (西前)
- Sengendai (浅間台)
- Tobe (戸部)

Additionally the zones of Fujimidai Elementary School (富士見台小学校) and Honcho Elementary School (本町小学校), with their campuses outside of Nishi-ku, include portions of Nishi-ku.

== Local attractions ==
- Minato Mirai 21
- Hara Model Railway Museum
- Nogeyama Zoo
- Yokohama Museum of Art
- Tenjin zaka Monument

== Events ==
Each June, Nishi Ward hosts the Yokohama Kaikō Festival to commemorate the opening of the city's port. In August, the Yokohama Carnival takes place near Yokohama Station.

== Noted people from Nishi Ward ==
- Minoru Suzuki, professional wrestler
- Reni Takagi, idol singer
