= Nogeyama Zoo =

Nogeyama Zoological Gardens
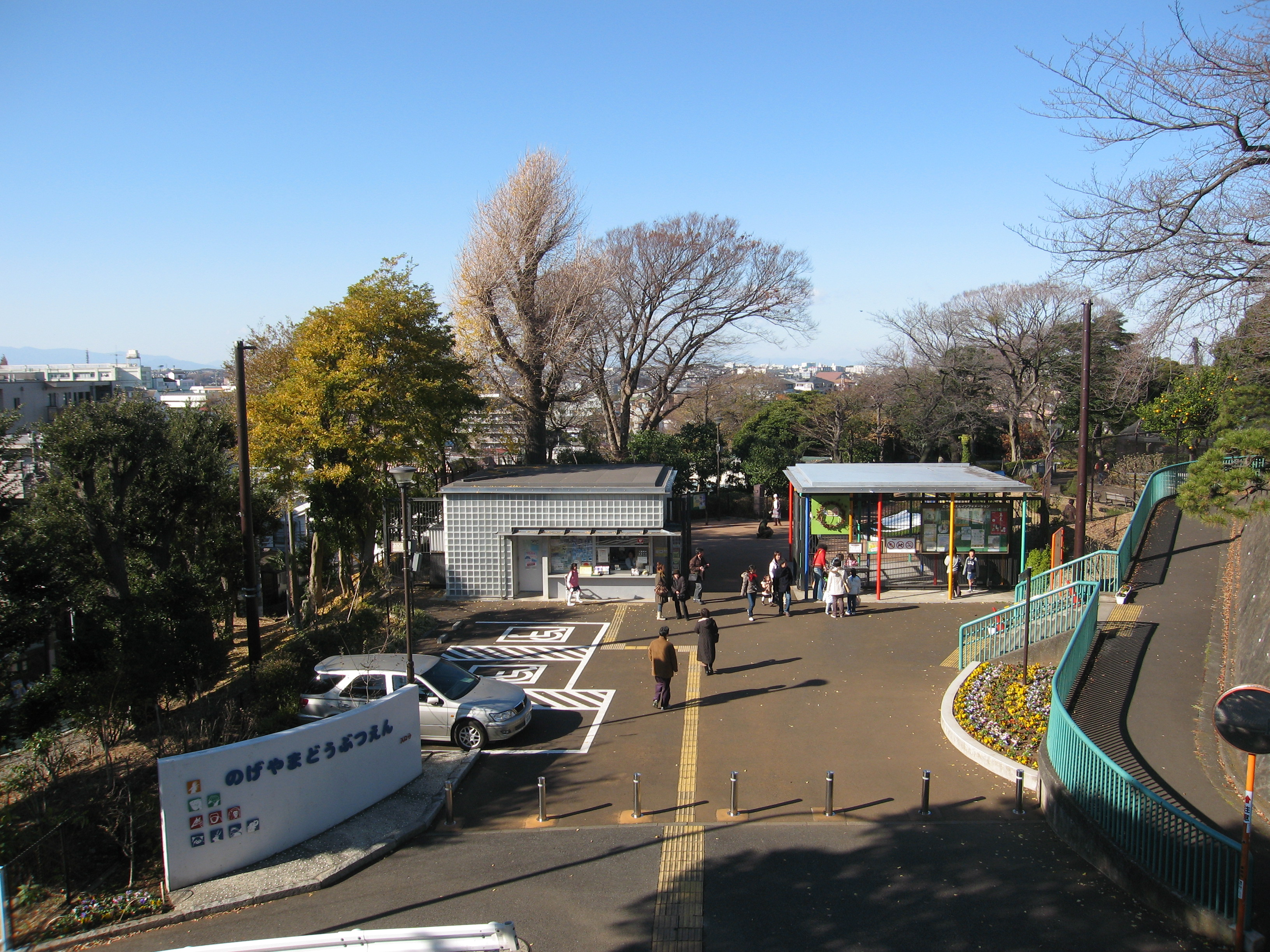
- Entrance to Nogeyama Zoo
- Interactive map of Nogeyama Zoological Gardens
- 35°26′48″N 139°37′22″E
- Date opened: April 1951
- Location: 63-10 Oimatsu-cho, Nishi-ku, Yokohama, Kanagawa Prefecture, Japan 〒220-0032
- Land area: 9.6 hectares (24 acres)
- No. of animals: 1416
- No. of species: 100
- Annual visitors: 680,000 (2009)
- Memberships: Yokohama City Environmental Department, JAZA
- Website: https://www.hama-midorinokyokai.or.jp/zoo/nogeyama/

Nogeyama Zoological Gardens (野毛山動物園, Nogeyama Dōbutsuen) is a free zoo opened in April 1951 and located in Nogeyama Park, in Nishi-ku, Yokohama, Japan. It covers 9.6 hectares (24 acres) and houses about 1400 animals of 100 different species. It is open from 9:30 am to 4:00 pm and is closed on Mondays.

The zoo is operated by the Yokohama Zoological Garden, and is a member of the Japanese Association of Zoos and Aquariums (JAZA).

== Animals ==
Animals at the zoo include Mandarin ducks, cranes, red pandas, chimpanzees, hamadryas baboons, reptiles, lion, tigers, Japanese raccoon dogs, badgers, pheasants, lovebirds, zebras, giraffes, flamingos, camels, ruffed lemurs, white-mantled black colobus, black-capped capuchins, swans, ducks, kagus, penguins, wallabies, deer, eagles, owls, condors, bears and Tokyo bitterlings.

The red panda is one of the first animals visitors see upon entering the zoo, and also one of the most popular.

== Makigahara Children's Zoo ==
The Makigahara Children's Zoo was opened in 1979 as part of the Nogeyama Zoo. It is primarily home to farm animals and small domestic animals such as mice, guinea pigs, chickens, rabbits and fantail pigeons, as well as some exotic species such as snakes.

== Conservation ==
The Nogeyama Zoo was the first zoo in Japan to successfully house leopards (1952), blackbuck (1953), dromedary camels (1954), sloth bears (1965), ring-tailed lemurs (1969), pileated gibbons and caracals (1974), clouded leopards (1983), giant anteaters (1985), Kleinmann's tortoises (1992), Asian forest tortoises (1997) and radiated tortoises (2009). It was also the second zoo in the world to successful breed Andean condors in captivity in 1972.

In 2016, the highly endangered Ploughshare tortoise from Madagascar was bred.
