= Tenjin zaka =

Coordinates: 35°38′22″N 139°43′59″E

Tenjin zaka (天神坂) (Hill of Tenjin) is a name used for several places in Japan.

- In Tokyo, Tenjinzaka is a hill road that runs along the promontory through many districts of Takanawa. It crosses Sakurada Dori. It is said that this name given to the slope because of a small shrine dedicated to Sugawara no Michizane, a scholar who is venerated as the patron deity of scholarship, Tenjin. A Calyx field could be seen from this slope in the Edo period, therefore sometimes it is referred to as Yoshimizaka which also had a secondary meaning of "Good Luck" slope.
- In Osaka, it is a slope in Tennoji-ku leading to the Yasui shrine dedicated to Sugawara no Michizane.
- In Nishi-ku, Yokohama, it is a monument on the slope of Tenjin Hill.
