= Shin-takashima Station =

Railway station in Yokohama, Kanagawa prefecture, Japan

Coordinates: 35°27′42.85″N 139°37′36.77″E

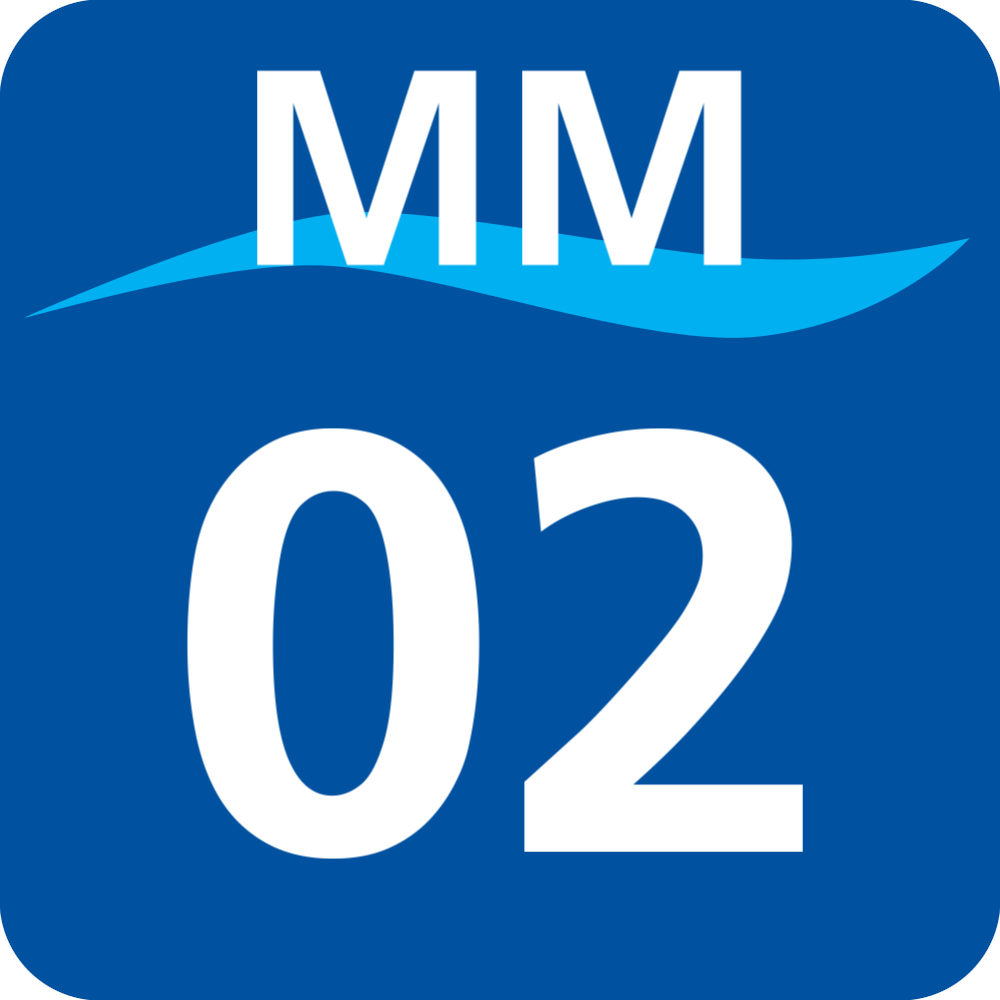
Shin-takashima Station 新高島駅

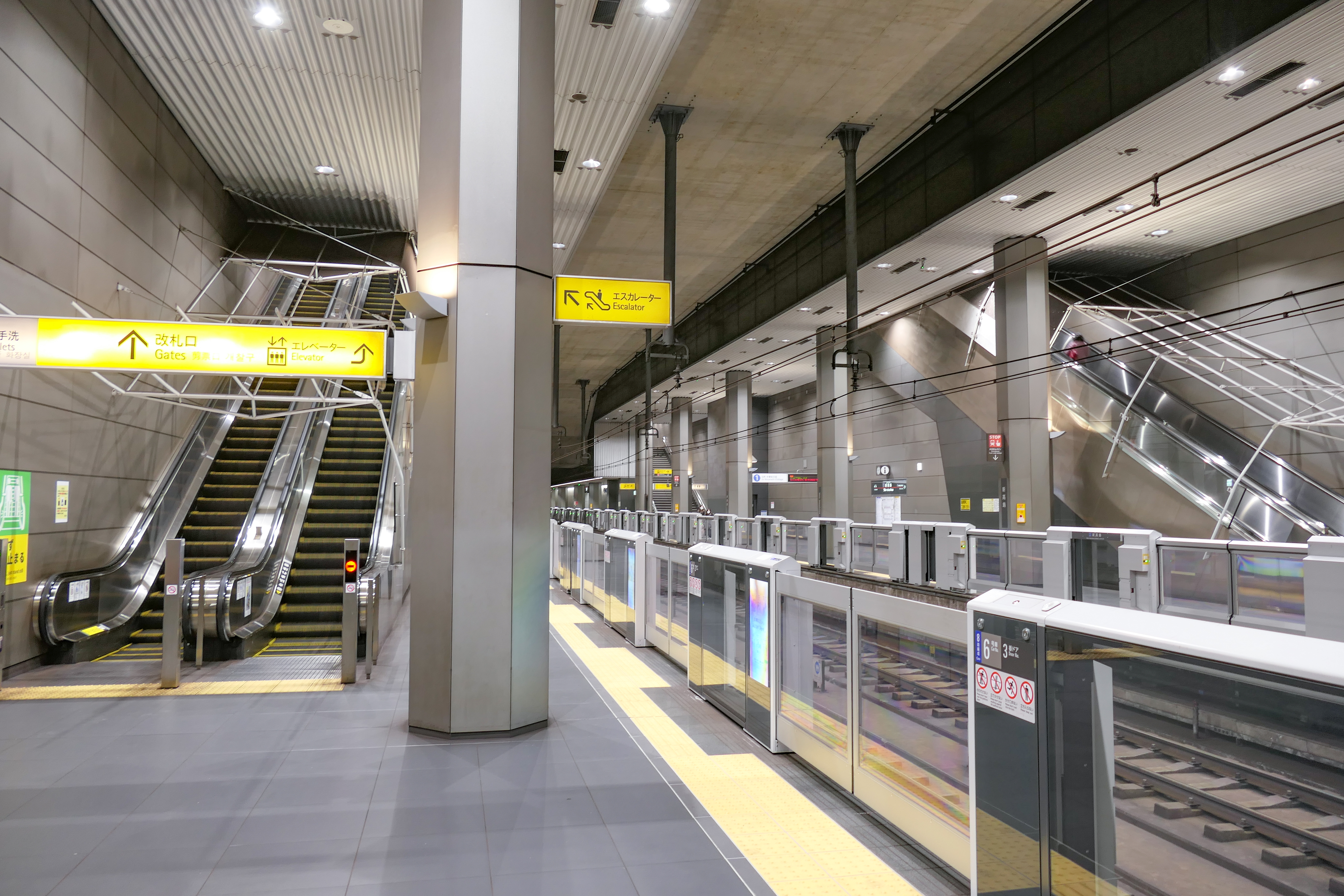
- Station platform, 18 December 2021

General information
- Location: 5-1-1 Minatomirai, Nishi, Yokohama, Kanagawa （横浜市西区みなとみらい五丁目1-1） Japan
- Operator: Yokohama Minatomirai Railway Company
- Line: Minatomirai Line

History
- Opened: 1 February 2004

Passengers
- FY2011: 5,144 daily

Services
Preceding station	Yokohama Minatomirai	Following station
Minatomirai towards Motomachi-Chūkagai	Minatomirai Line Local	Yokohama Terminus
Location

Shin-takashima Station (新高島駅, Shin-takashima-eki) is an underground railway station on the Minatomirai Line in Nishi-ku, Yokohama, Kanagawa Prefecture, Japan, operated by the third-sector railway operating company Yokohama Minatomirai Railway.

== Lines ==
Shin-takashima Station is served by the 4.1-kilometre (2.5 mi) underground Minatomirai Line from Yokohama to Motomachi-Chukagai, and is located 0.8 kilometres (0.5 mi) from the starting point of the line at Yokohama Station. Trains through-run to and from the Tokyu Toyoko Line from Shibuya Station and beyond on the Tokyo Metro Fukutoshin Line and Tobu Tojo Line and Seibu Ikebukuro Line.

== Station layout ==
Shin-takashima Station is an underground station with two side platforms serving two tracks. It is the deepest underground of any station on the Minatomirai Line.

=== Platforms ===
1	Minatomirai Line	for Minatomirai and Motomachi-Chūkagai
2	Minatomirai Line	for Yokohama; Tokyu Toyoko Line for Shibuya; Tokyo Metro Fukutoshin Line for Shinjuku-sanchōme, Ikebukuro, and Wakōshi; Tobu Tojo Line for Kawagoeshi and Shinrin-kōen; Seibu Ikebukuro Line for Hannō

== History ==
Shin-takashima Station opened on 1 February 2004, coinciding with the opening of the Minatomirai Line.

This was the last station on the Minatomirai Line to begin operation of platform screen doors. The devices were installed and became operational on 6 November 2021.

== Passenger statistics ==
In fiscal 2011, the station was used by an average of 5,144 passengers daily.

== Surrounding area ==
- Nissan Motors global headquarters
- Marinos Town
- Hara Model Railway Museum
