= Kanagawa Station (Kanagawa) =

Railway station in Yokohama, Japan

KK36 Kanagawa Station 神奈川駅
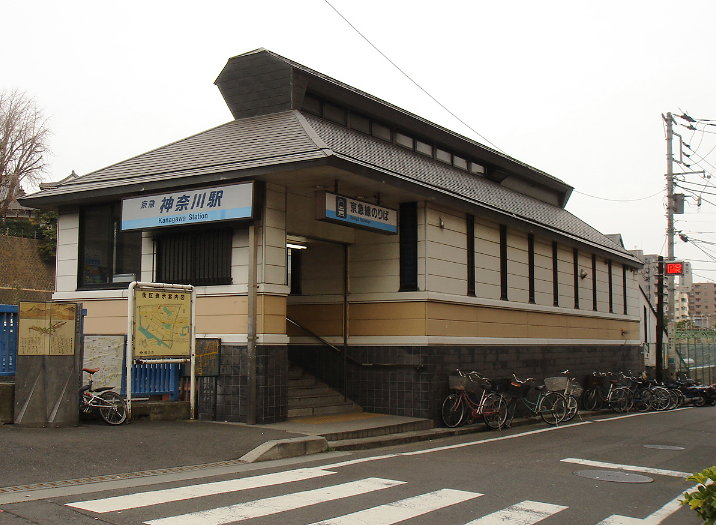
- Kanagawa Station in January 2007

General information
- Location: 1-1 Aoki-chō, Kanagawa-ku, Yokohama-shi, Kanagawa-ken 221-0057; Japan
- Coordinates: 35°28′15.66″N 139°37′37.52″E
- Operator: Keikyū
- Line: Keikyū Main Line
- Distance: 21.5 km from Shinagawa
- Platforms: 2 side platforms
- Connections: Bus stop

Other information
- Station code: KK36
- Website: Official website

History
- Opened: 25 December 1905
- Former names: Aokibashi; Keihin Kanagawa (until 1956)

Passengers
- 2019: 4,751 daily

Services
Preceding station	Keikyu	Following station
Yokohama KK37 towards Uraga	Main Line Local	Keikyū Higashi-kanagawa KK35 towards Shinagawa
Location
- Location within Kanagawa Prefecture Location within Japan

Kanagawa Station (神奈川駅, Kanagawa-eki) is a passenger railway station located in Kanagawa-ku, Yokohama, Kanagawa Prefecture, Japan, operated by the private railway company Keikyū.

== Lines ==
Kanagawa Station is served by the Keikyū Main Line and is located 21.5 kilometers from the terminus of the line at Shinagawa Station in Tokyo.

== Station layout ==
Kanagawa Station is an elevated station with two opposed side platforms serving two tracks. The tracks are on embankments, with the station building underneath.

=== Platforms ===
1	■ Keikyū Main Line	for Yokohama, Zushi·Hayama, Uraga and Misakiguchi
2	■ Keikyū Main Line	for Keikyū Kamata, Haneda Airport, and Shinagawa

== History ==
The station opened on December 24, 1905, as a station on the Keihin Electric Railway. It closed on June 22, 1929, but reopened as Aokibashi Station (青木橋駅) on March 29, 1930. Six days later, it was renamed Keihin Kanagawa Station (京浜神奈川駅). The station was renamed Kanagawa Station on April 20, 1956. The platforms were lengthened in 1971, and a new station building was completed in February 1992.

Keikyū introduced station numbering to its stations on 21 October 2010; Kanagawa Station was assigned station number KK36.

== Passenger statistics ==
In fiscal 2019, the station was used by an average of 4,751 passengers daily.

The passenger figures for previous years are as shown below.

Fiscal year	daily average
2005	5,454
2010	5,363
2015	4,741

== Surrounding area ==
- Aoki Bridge
- Hongakuji Temple
- Kogaya Park (Gongenyama Castle Ruins)
- Yokohama City Kogaya Elementary School

== See also ==
- List of railway stations in Japan
