= Keikyū Higashi-kanagawa Station =

Railway station in Yokohama, Japan

KK35 Keikyū Higashi-kanagawa Station 京急東神奈川駅
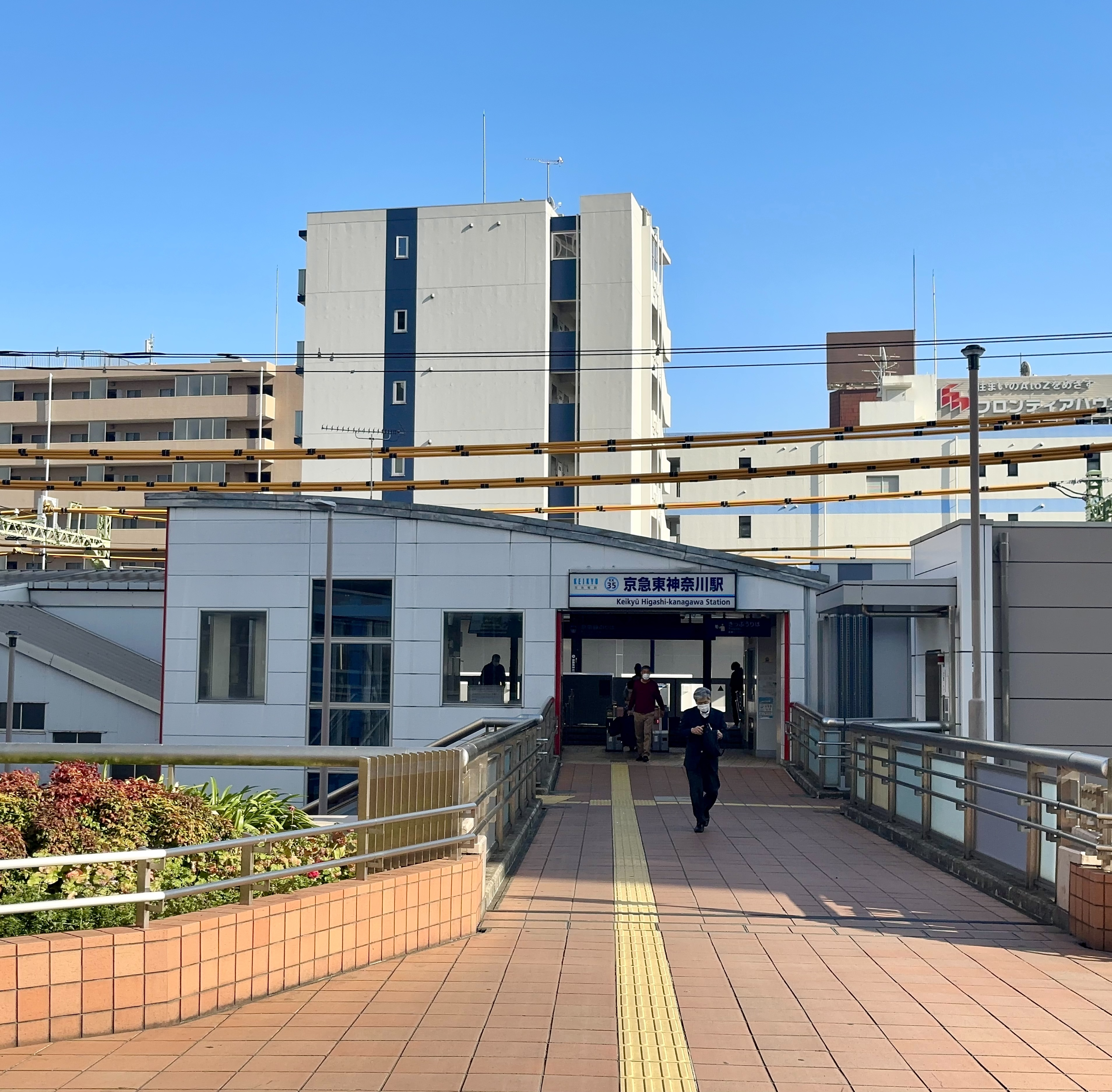
- Keikyū Higashi-kanagawa Station ground-level entrance in March 2023

General information
- Location: 1-11-5 Higashi-Kanagawa, Kanagawa-ku, Yokohama-shi, Kanagawa-ken 221-0044; Japan
- Coordinates: 35.4776°N 139.6346°E
- Operator: Keikyu Corporation
- Line: Keikyu Main Line
- Distance: 21.7 km from Sengakuji
- Platforms: 2 side platforms
- Tracks: 2
- Connections: Higashi-Kanagawa Station (JR East); Bus stop

Other information
- Station code: KK35
- Website: Official website

History
- Opened: 24 December 1905
- Former names: Nakakido Station (until 2020)

Passengers
- FY2019: 23,821 daily

Services
Preceding station	Keikyu	Following station
Yokohama KK37 towards Kanazawa-hakkei	Main Line Express	Kanagawa-shimmachi KK34 towards Keikyū Kamata
Kanagawa KK36 towards Uraga	Main Line Local	Kanagawa-shimmachi KK34 towards Shinagawa
Location
- Location within Kanagawa Prefecture Location within Japan

Keikyū Higashi-kanagawa Station (京急東神奈川駅, Keikyū Higashi-kanagawa-eki) is a passenger railway station located in Kanagawa-ku, Yokohama, Kanagawa Prefecture, Japan, operated by the private railway company Keikyū. The station is approximately 50 m from Higashi-Kanagawa Station on the Keihin-Tohoku Line and Yokohama Line.

== Lines ==
Keikyū Higashi-kanagawa Station is served by the Keikyū Main Line and is located 21.7 kilometers from the terminus of the line at Shinagawa Station in Tokyo.

== Station layout ==
The station consists of two opposed side platforms serving two tracks. The tracks are on an embankment, with the station building underneath.

=== Platforms ===
1	■ Keikyu Main Line	for Yokohama, Zushi·Hayama, Uraga, and Misakiguchi
2	■ Keikyu Main Line	for Keikyu Kamata, Haneda Airport, and Shinagawa

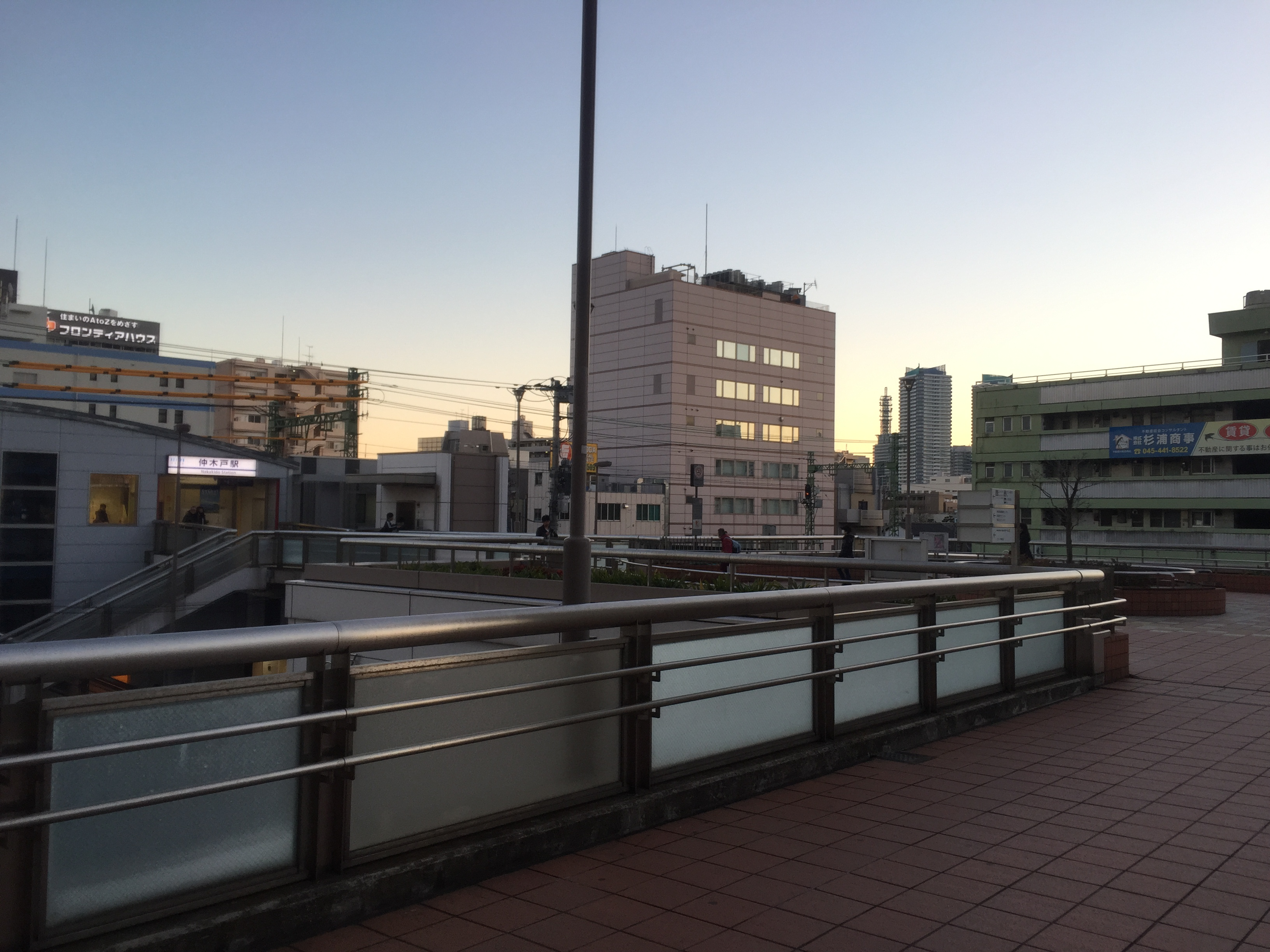
The elevated entrance and pedestrian walkway connecting with JR Higashi-Kanagawa station in January 2015

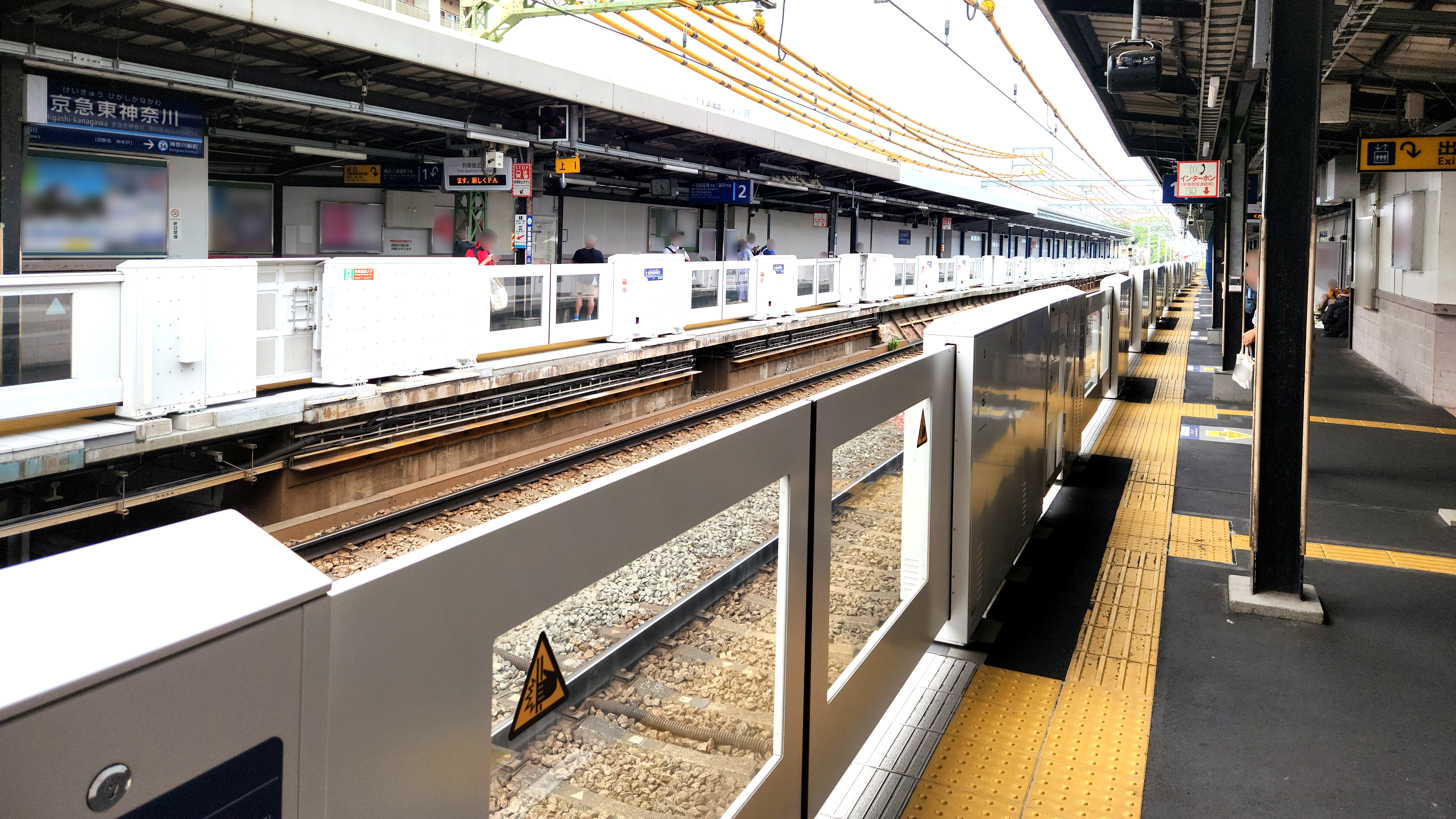
The platforms in July 2023

== History ==
The station opened on December 24, 1905, originally named Nakakido Station (中木戸駅) (with differing kanji characters). The station was rebuilt as an elevated station in August 1910, but was destroyed in an air raid on May 29, 1945, and again by a fire in July 1957. The platforms were lengthened in 1971, and a pedestrian walkway was added in 2004.

Keikyū introduced station numbering to its stations on 21 October 2010; Keikyū Higashi-kanagawa Station was assigned station number KK35.

The station was renamed Keikyū Higashi-kanagawa (京急東神奈川駅, Keikyū Higashikanagawa-eki) on 14 March 2020.

== Passenger statistics ==
In fiscal 2019, the station was used by an average of 23,821 passengers daily.

The passenger figures for previous years are as shown below.

Fiscal year	daily average
2005	12,838
2010	16,910
2015	21,904

== Surrounding area ==
- Japan National Route 15
- Higashi-Kanagawa Station(approximately 50 m away, connected by a pedestrian walkway)

== See also ==
- List of railway stations in Japan
