= Kanagawa-shimmachi Station =

Railway station in Yokohama, Japan

KK34 Kanagawa-shimmachi Station 神奈川新町駅
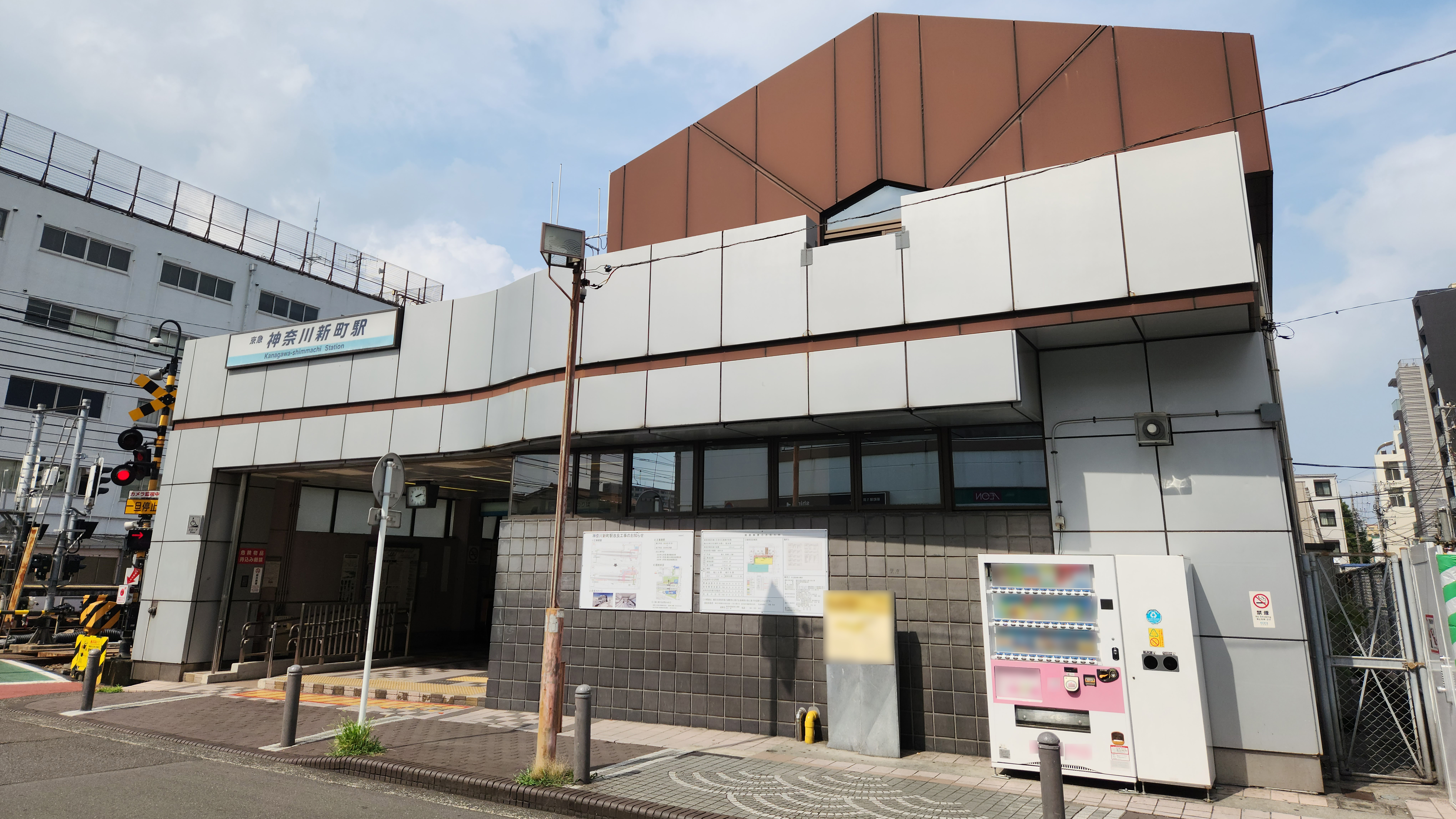
- The station building in August 2023

General information
- Location: 19-1 Kamezumi-chō, Kanagawa-ku, Yokohama-shi, Kanagawa-ken 221-0041; Japan
- Coordinates: 35.4814°N 139.6400°E
- Operator: Keikyū
- Line: Keikyū Main Line
- Distance: 20.0 km from Shinagawa
- Platforms: 2 island platforms
- Connections: Bus stop

Other information
- Station code: KK34
- Website: Official website

History
- Opened: August 21, 1915
- Former names: Shinmachi (until 1927)

Passengers
- 2019: 19,584 daily

Services
Preceding station	Keikyu	Following station
Yokohama KK37 towards Uraga	Main Line Limited Express (Tokkyū)	Keikyū Kawasaki KK20 towards Sengakuji
Keikyū Higashi-kanagawa KK35 towards Kanazawa-hakkei	Main Line Express	Keikyū Tsurumi KK29 towards Keikyū Kamata
Keikyū Higashi-kanagawa KK35 towards Uraga	Main Line Local	Koyasu KK33 towards Shinagawa
Location
- Location within Kanagawa Prefecture Location within Japan

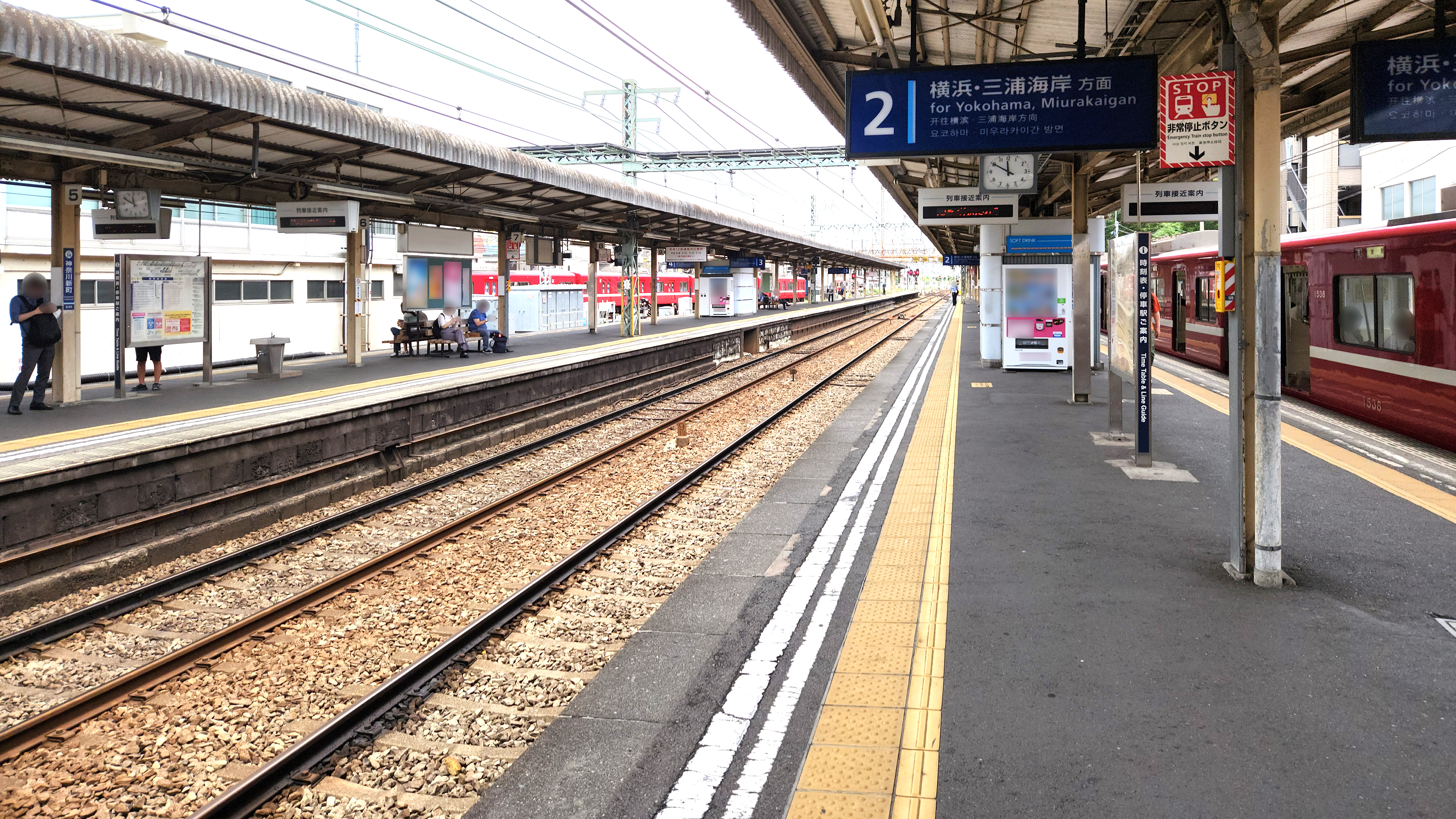
The platforms in July 2023

Kanagawa-shimmachi Station (神奈川新町駅, Kanagawa-shinmachi-eki) is a passenger railway station located in Kanagawa-ku, Yokohama, Kanagawa Prefecture, Japan, operated by the private railway company Keikyū.

== Lines ==
Kanagawa-shimmachi Station is served by the Keikyū Main Line and is located 20.0 kilometers (12.4 mi) from the terminus of the line at Shinagawa Station in Tokyo.

== Station layout ==
The station consists of two elevated island platforms serving four tracks, with the station building underneath.

=== Platforms ===
1-2	Keikyū Main Line	for Yokohama, Zushi·Hayama, Uraga, and Misakiguchi
3-4	Keikyū Main Line	for Keikyū Kamata, Haneda Airport (Terminal 3 and Terminal 1·2), Shinagawa, and Sengakuji; Toei Asakusa Line for Nihombashi and Oshiage; Keisei Oshiage Line for Aoto

== History ==
Kanagawa-shimmachi Station opened on August 21, 1915 as Shinmachi Station (新町駅, Shinmachi-eki). It assumed its present name in April, 1927. In March 1978, the platforms were lengthened to handle 12-car long trains.

On September 5, 2019 at approximately 11:40, a Keikyu express train in the direction of Yokohama crashed into a truck on the railway crossing just beyond the platform of the Kanagawa-shimmachi station. The express train derailed, leaving 1 person (the truck driver) dead and 30 people injured.

Keikyū introduced station numbering to its stations on 21 October 2010; Kanagawa-shimmachi was assigned station number KK34.

== Passenger statistics ==
In fiscal 2019, the station was used by an average of 19,584 passengers daily.

The passenger figures for previous years are as shown below.

Fiscal year	daily average
2005	16,760
2010	16,736
2015	18,310

== Surrounding area ==
- Shinmachi Keikyu training center
- Kanagawa Shirahata Post Office

== See also ==
- List of railway stations in Japan
