= Yokohama Station =

Major railway and metro station in Yokohama, Japan

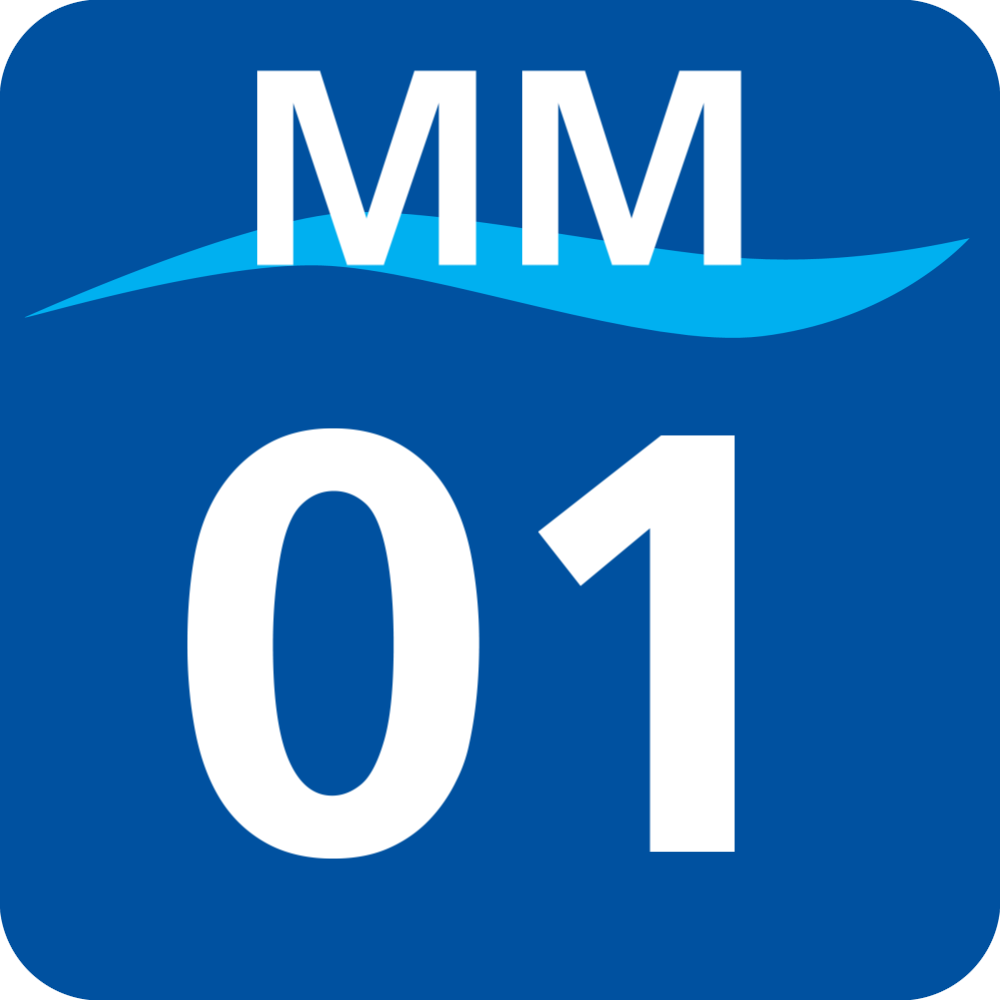
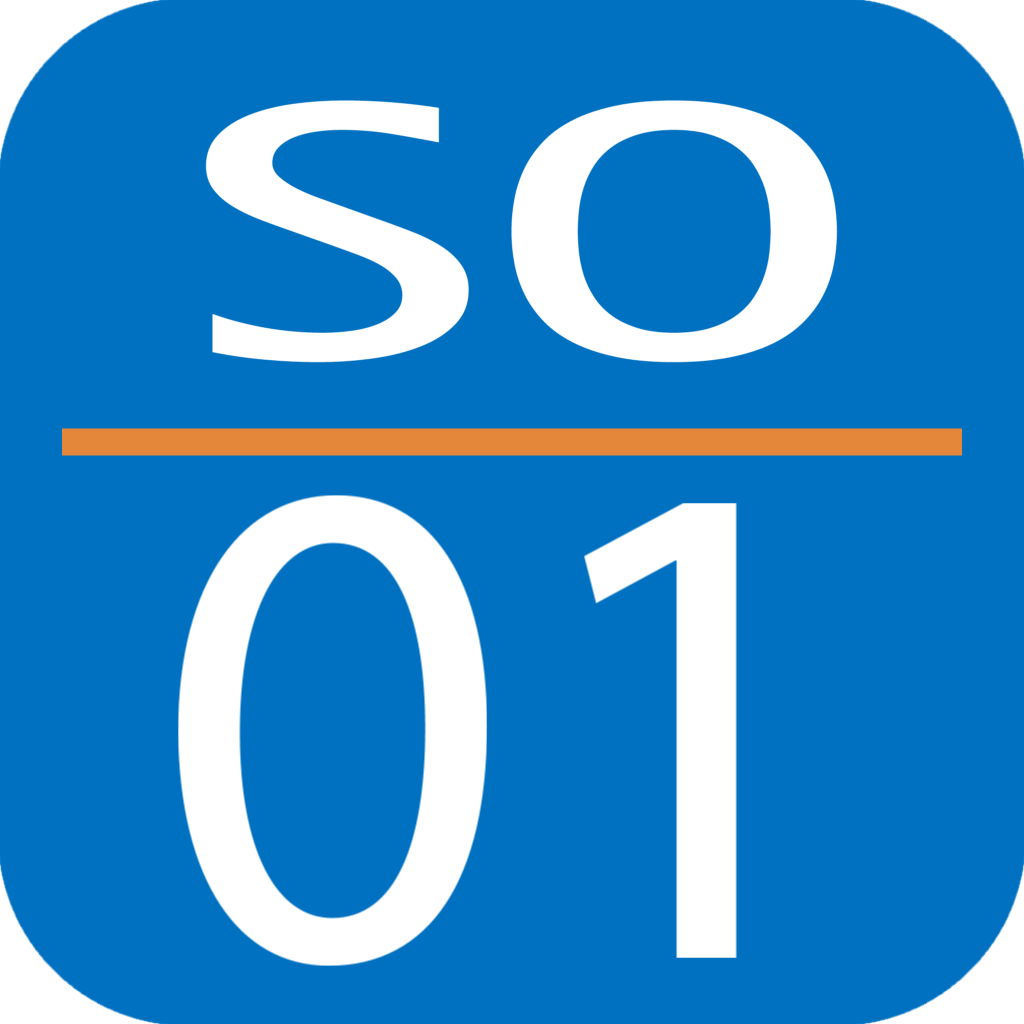
YHMJT05 JK12 JO13 JS13 B20 KK37 Yokohama Station 横浜駅

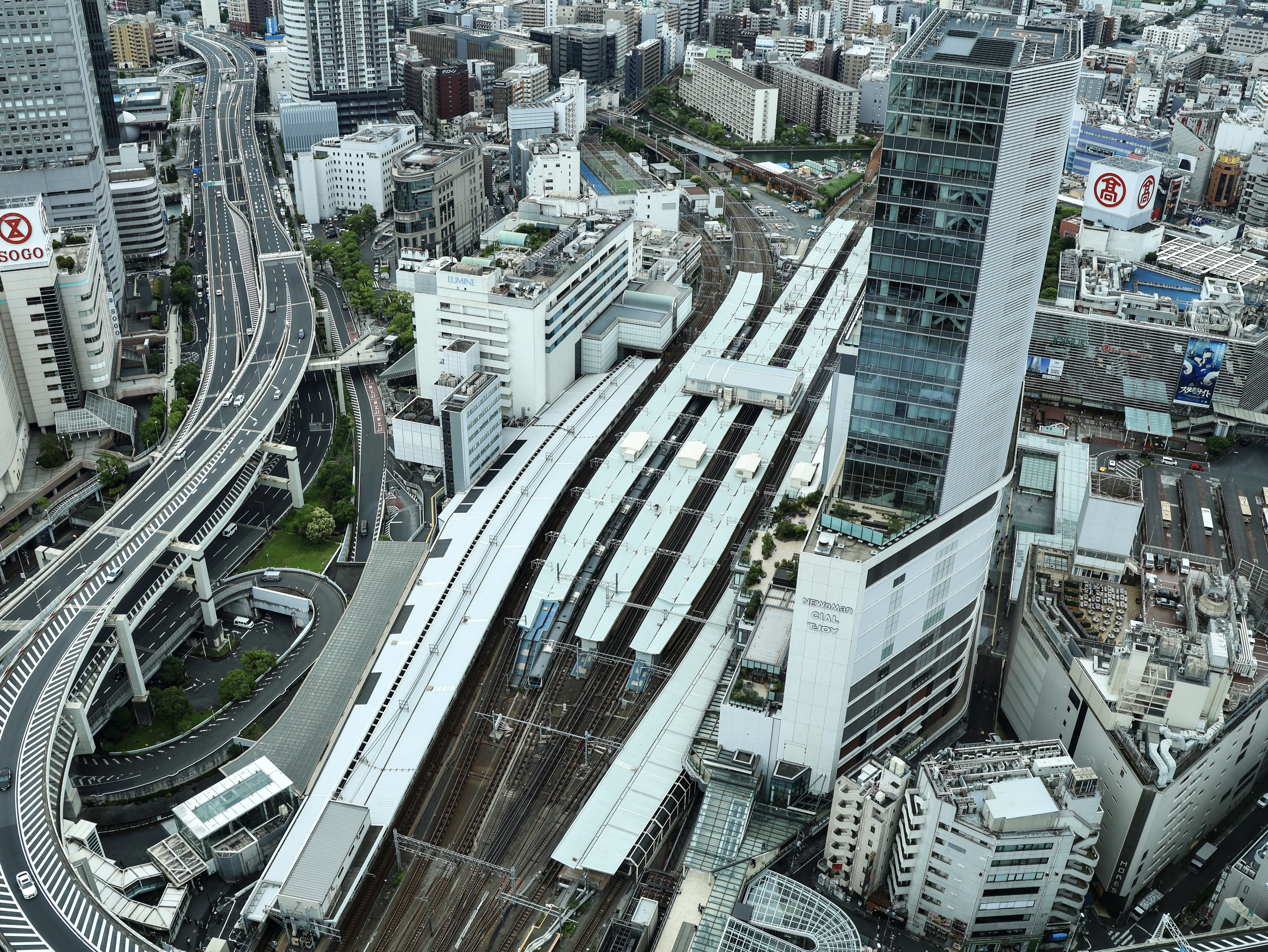
- Yokohama Station viewed from above, June 2024

Japanese name
- Shinjitai: 横浜駅
- Kyūjitai: 橫濱驛
- Hiragana: よこはまえき

General information
- Location: 1 Takashima (Keikyū); 2 Takashima (JR East); 1 Minami-Saiwai (Tokyu, Sotetsu, Subway); Nishi Ward, Yokohama City, Kanagawa Prefecture; Japan
- Coordinates: 35°27′57″N 139°37′22″E
- Operator: JR East; Keikyū; Tōkyū Railways; Yokohama Minatomirai Railway; Sagami Railway (Sōtetsu); Yokohama City Transportation Bureau
- Connections: Bus terminal

History
- Opened: 7 May 1872; 154 years ago
Services
Preceding station	JR East	Following station
Atami JT21 Terminus	Sunrise Izumo and Sunrise Seto	Tokyo Terminus
Atami JT21 towards Itō	Saphir Odoriko	Shinagawa towards Tokyo
Atami JT21 towards Itō	Saphir Odoriko	Musashi-Kosugi towards Shinjuku
Ōfuna towards Itō or Atami	Odoriko	Kawasaki towards Tokyo
Totsuka towards Atami	Tōkaidō Line	Kawasaki towards Tokyo
through to Negishi Line	Keihin–Tōhoku Line Rapid Local	Higashi-Kanagawa JK13 towards Ōmiya
Sakuragichō JK11 towards Ōfuna	Negishi Line	through to Keihin–Tōhoku Line
Sakuragichō JK11 towards Ōfuna	Yokohama Line Rapid Local	Higashi-Kanagawa JH13 towards Hachiōji
Totsuka towards Ōfuna	Narita Express	Musashi-Kosugi towards Narita Airport Terminal 1
Hodogaya JO12 towards Kurihama	Yokosuka Line	Shin-Kawasaki JO14 towards Tokyo
Totsuka towards Odawara	Shōnan–Shinjuku Line Special Rapid Rapid	Musashi-Kosugi towards Maebashi or Takasaki
Hodogaya JS12 towards Zushi	Shōnan–Shinjuku Line Rapid Local	Shin-Kawasaki JS14 towards Utsunomiya
Preceding station	Keikyu	Following station
Kamiōoka KK44 towards Misakiguchi	Evening Wing	Keikyū Kawasaki KK20 One-way operation
Kamiōoka KK44 towards Horinouchi	Main Line Limited Express (Kaitoku)	Keikyū Kawasaki KK20 towards Sengakuji
Kamiōoka KK44 towards Uraga	Main Line Limited Express (Tokkyū)	Kanagawa-shimmachi KK34 towards Sengakuji
Hinodechō KK39 towards Kanazawa-hakkei	Main Line Express	Keikyū Higashi-kanagawa KK35 towards Keikyū Kamata
Tobe KK38 towards Uraga	Main Line Local	Kanagawa KK36 towards Shinagawa
Preceding station	Sagami Railway	Following station
Nishiya towards Ebina	Sōtetsu Main Line Limited Express	Terminus
Nishiya One-way operation	Sōtetsu Main Line Commuter Express	Terminus
Hoshikawa towards Ebina	Sōtetsu Main Line Rapid	Terminus
Hiranumabashi towards Ebina	Sōtetsu Main Line Local	Terminus
Preceding station	Tōkyū Railways	Following station
Minatomirai towards Motomachi-Chūkagai	S-Train (Weekends and national holidays)	Jiyūgaoka towards Seibu-Chichibu
Minatomirai towards Motomachi-Chūkagai	F Liner	Kikuna towards Hannō or Ogawamachi
through to Minatomirai Line	Tōyoko Line Limited Express Commuter Express Express	Kikuna towards Shibuya
through to Minatomirai Line	Tōyoko Line Local	Tammachi towards Shibuya
Preceding station	Yokohama Minatomirai	Following station
Minatomirai towards Motomachi-Chūkagai	Minatomirai Line Limited Express Commuter Express Express	through to Tōkyū Tōyoko Line
Shin-takashima towards Motomachi-Chūkagai	Minatomirai Line Local	through to Tōkyū Tōyoko Line
Preceding station	Yokohama Municipal Subway	Following station
Sakuragichō B18 towards Shonandai	Blue Line Rapid	Shin-Yokohama B25 towards Azamino
Takashimachō B19 towards Shonandai	Blue Line Local	Mitsuzawa-shimochō B21 towards Azamino
Location
- Location within Yokohama Location within Kanagawa Prefecture Location within Japan

Yokohama Station (横浜駅, Yokohama-eki) is a major interchange railway station in Nishi-ku, Yokohama, Japan. It is the busiest station in Kanagawa Prefecture and the fifth-busiest in the world as of 2013, serving 760 million passengers a year.

== Lines ==
Yokohama Station is served by the following lines:

- East Japan Railway Company (JR East)
  - Tokaido Main Line (plus through service via the Ueno–Tokyo Line)
  - Shōnan-Shinjuku Line
  - Yokosuka Line
  - Yokohama Line
  - Keihin-Tohoku Line
  - Negishi Line

Shōnan limited express trains do not stop here. Sunrise Izumo and Sunrise Seto sleeper trains stop here for boarding and alighting passengers.

- Keikyū
  - Keikyū Main Line

Morning Wing and Evening Wing trains pass this station.

- Sagami Railway (Sotetsu)
  - Sotetsu Main Line
- Tokyu Corporation
  - Tokyu Toyoko Line
- Yokohama Minatomirai Railway
  - Minatomirai Line
- Yokohama Municipal Subway
  - Blue Line

(JR Central's Tokaido Shinkansen passes through Shin-Yokohama Station, not Yokohama Station.)

== Station layout ==
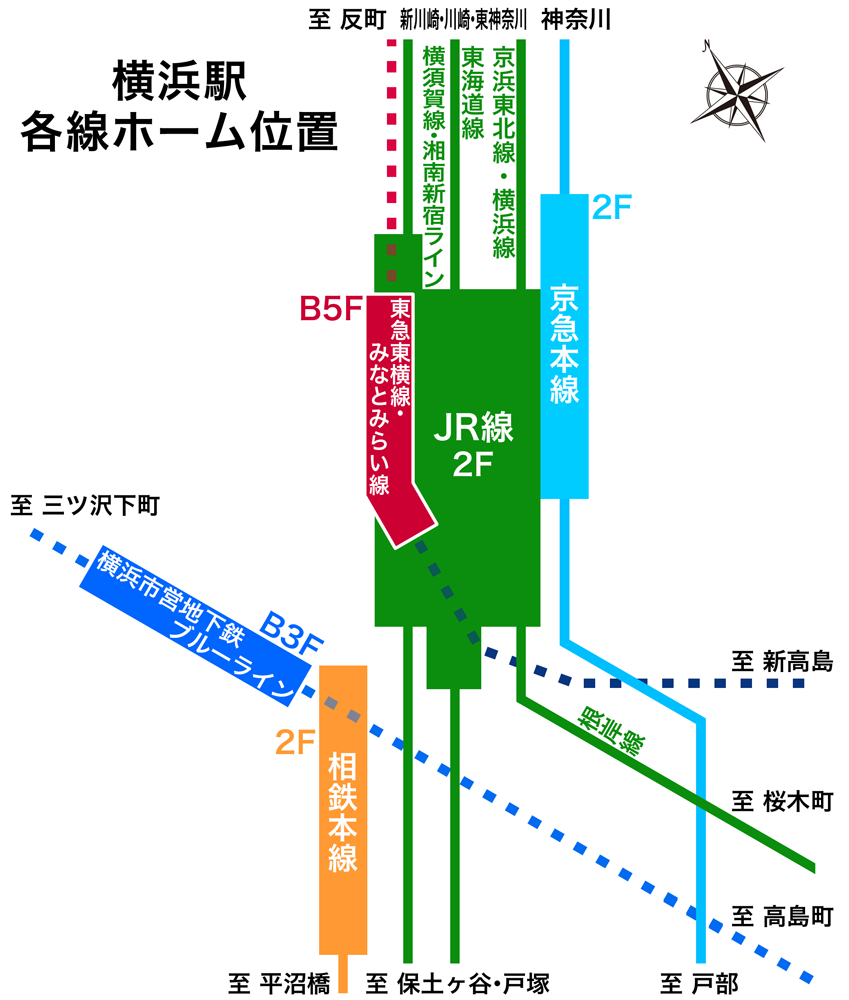
Relative positions of platforms at Yokohama station

=== Keikyu and JR East ===
The JR East and Keikyū platforms are located in the main above-ground portion of Yokohama Station. Keikyū's section consists of platforms 1 to 2, JR East operates platforms 3 to 10.

Keikyū introduced station numbering to its stations on 21 October 2010; Yokohama Station was assigned station number KK37.

1	Keikyū Main Line	for Kamiōoka, Yokosuka-chūō, Uraga, Miurakaigan, and Misakiguchi
2	Keikyū Main Line	for Keikyū Kamata, Haneda Airport (Terminal 3 and Terminal 1·2), Shinagawa, and Sengakuji; Toei Asakusa Line for Shimbashi, Asakusa and Oshiage; Keisei Main Line for Keisei Funabashi, Keisei Narita, and Narita Airport (Terminal 2·3 and Terminal 1); Narita Sky Access Line for Narita Airport; Hokusō Line for Imba Nihon-idai
3	Negishi Line	for Sakuragichō, Kannai, Ishikawachō, Isogo, and Ōfuna
4	Keihin-Tōhoku Line	for Tokyo, Ueno, Minami-Urawa, and Ōmiya
4	Yokohama Line	for Shin-Yokohama, Nagatsuta, Machida, Hashimoto, and Hachiōji
5-6	Tōkaidō Line	for Totsuka, Ōfuna, Fujisawa, Chigasaki, Hiratsuka, Kōzu, Odawara, and Atami
5-6	Tōkaidō Line	Super View Odoriko/Odoriko for Izukyu-Shimoda and Shuzenji
5-6	Tōkaidō Line	□ Sleeper Ltd. Express Sunrise Izumo for Okayama and Izumoshi □ Sleeper Ltd. Express Sunrise Seto for Okayama and Takamatsu
7-8	Tōkaidō Line (Ueno-Tokyo Line)	for Kawasaki, Shinagawa, Shimbashi, Tokyo, Ueno, Ōmiya, Utsunomiya (via Utsunomiya Line), and Takasaki (via Takasaki Line)
9	Yokosuka Line	for Ōfuna, Kamakura, Yokosuka, and Kurihama
9	Shōnan-Shinjuku Line	Ōfuna, Fujisawa, Chigasaki, Hiratsuka, Kōzu, and Odawara (to the Tōkaidō Line)
9	Shōnan-Shinjuku Line	Ōfuna, Kamakura, and Zushi (to the Yokosuka Line)
10	Yokosuka Line	for Musashi-Kosugi, Tokyo, Tsudanuma, Chiba, Narita Airport (Terminal 2·3 and Terminal 1), Kimitsu, and Kazusa-Ichinomiya
10	Yokosuka Line	■ Narita Express for Narita Airport
10	Shōnan-Shinjuku Line	Shibuya, Shinjuku, Ikebukuro, Ōmiya, Utsunomiya (via Utsunomiya Line), and Takasaki (via Takasaki Line)

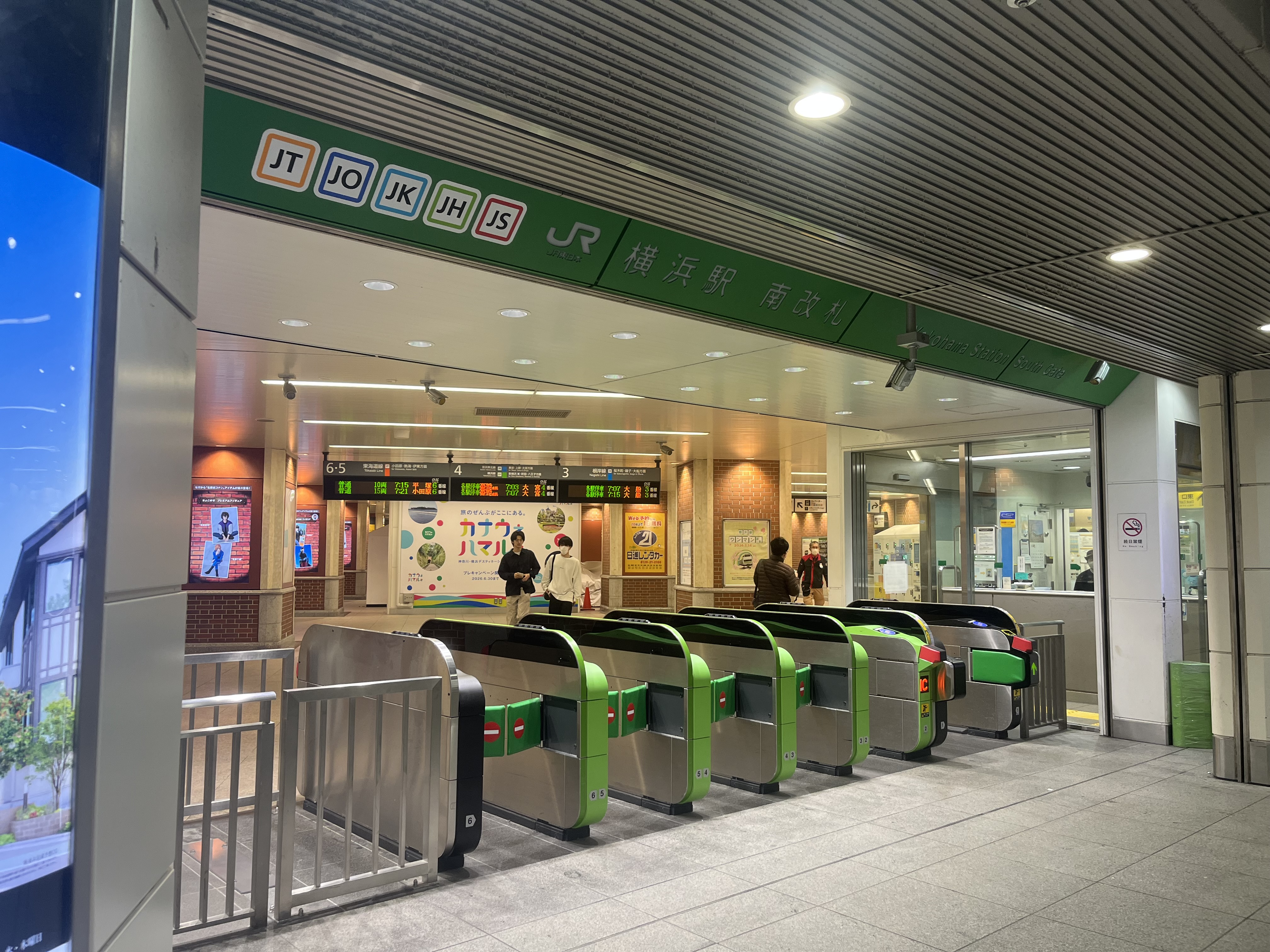
south gates to JR platforms

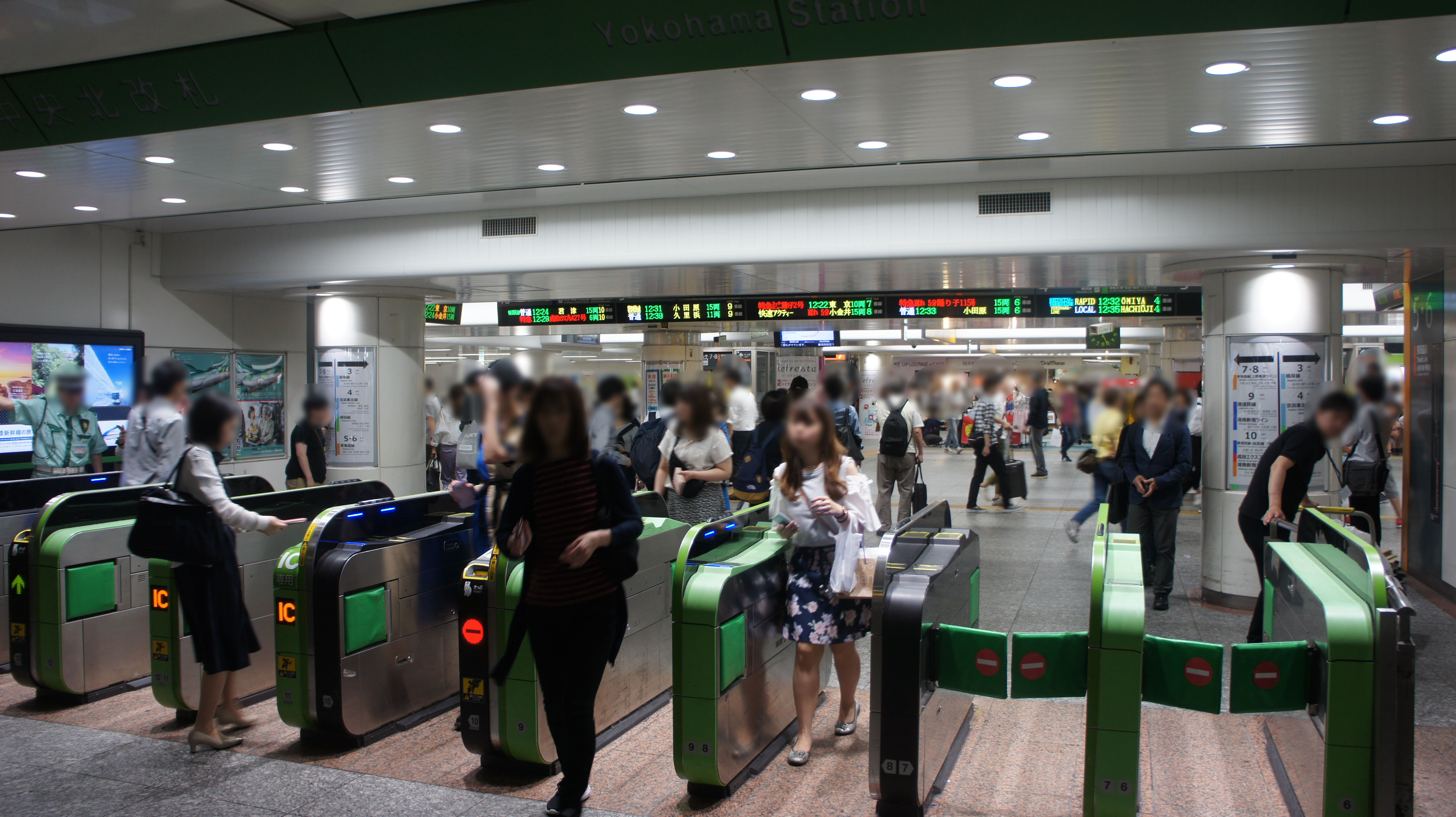
Central North gates to JR platforms

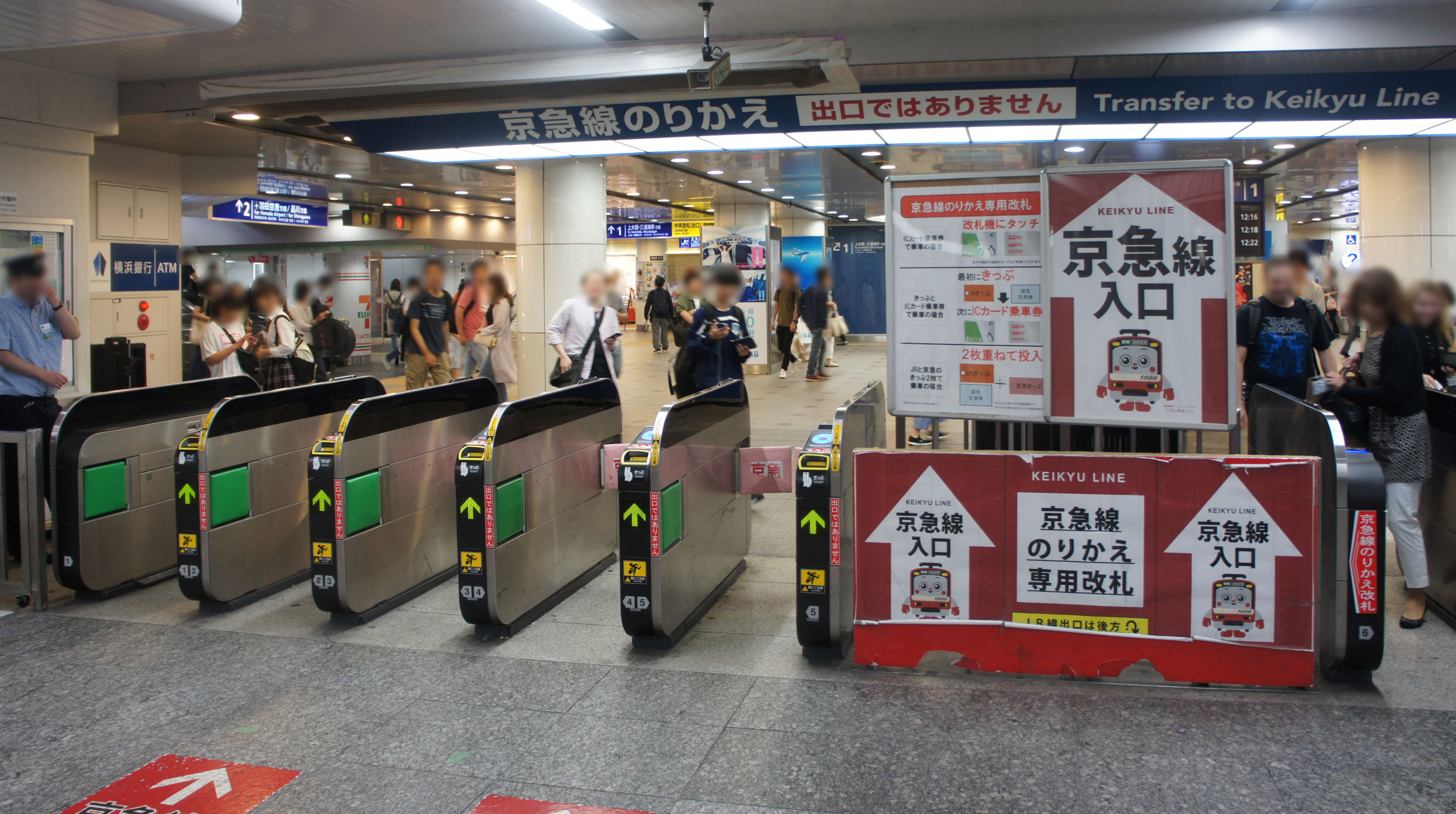
Keikyu transfer gates

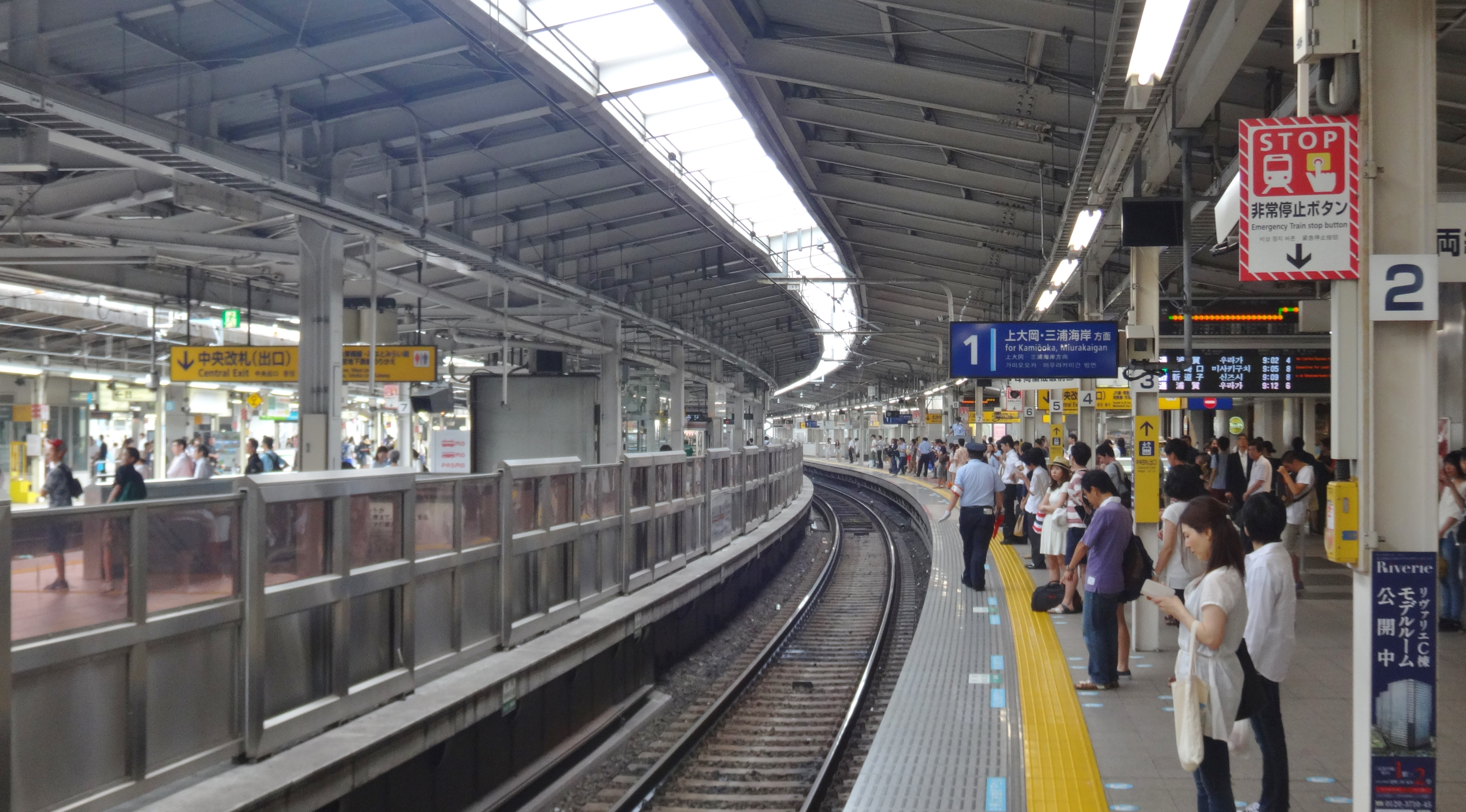
Keikyu platform 1, 2015

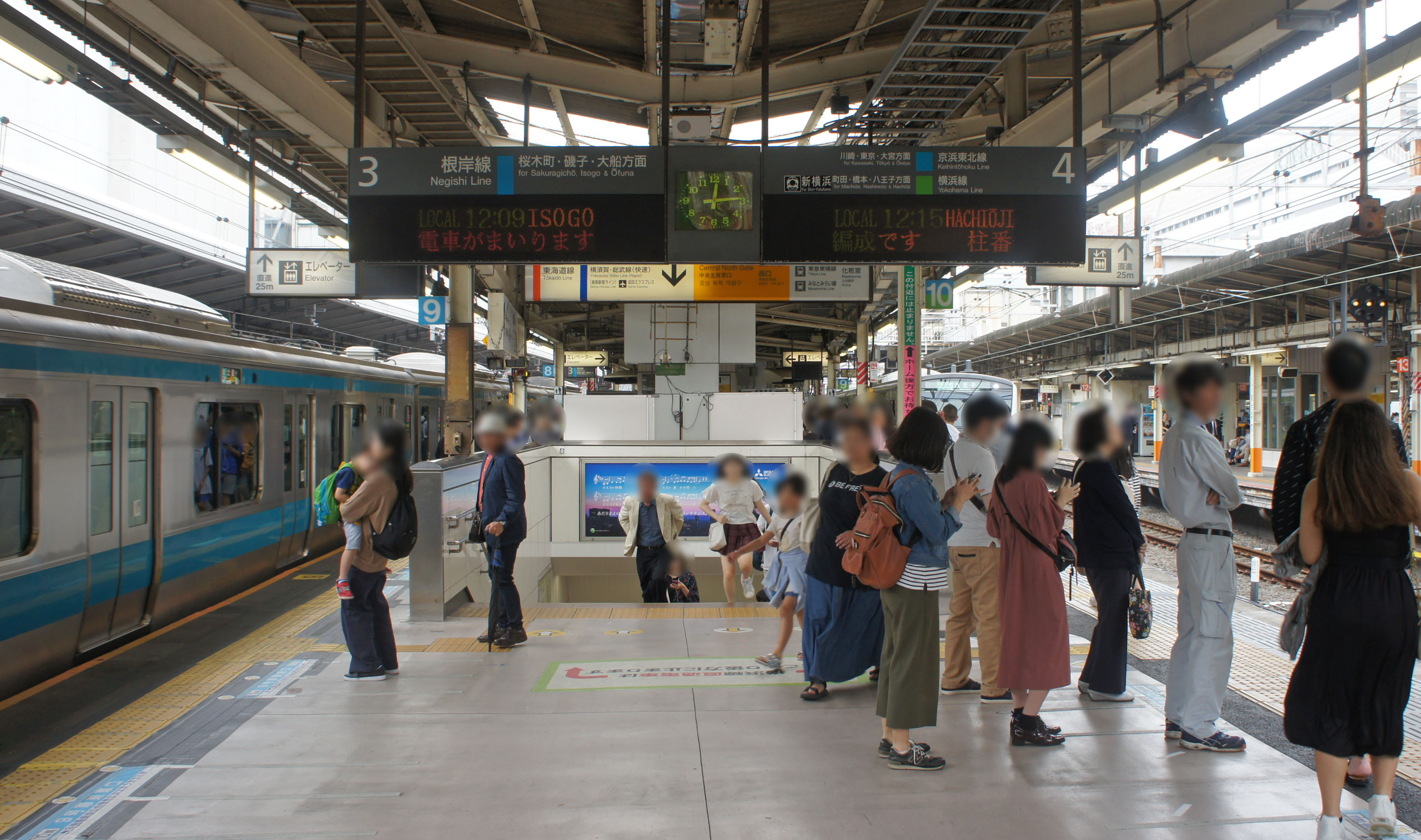
JR platforms 3 and 4

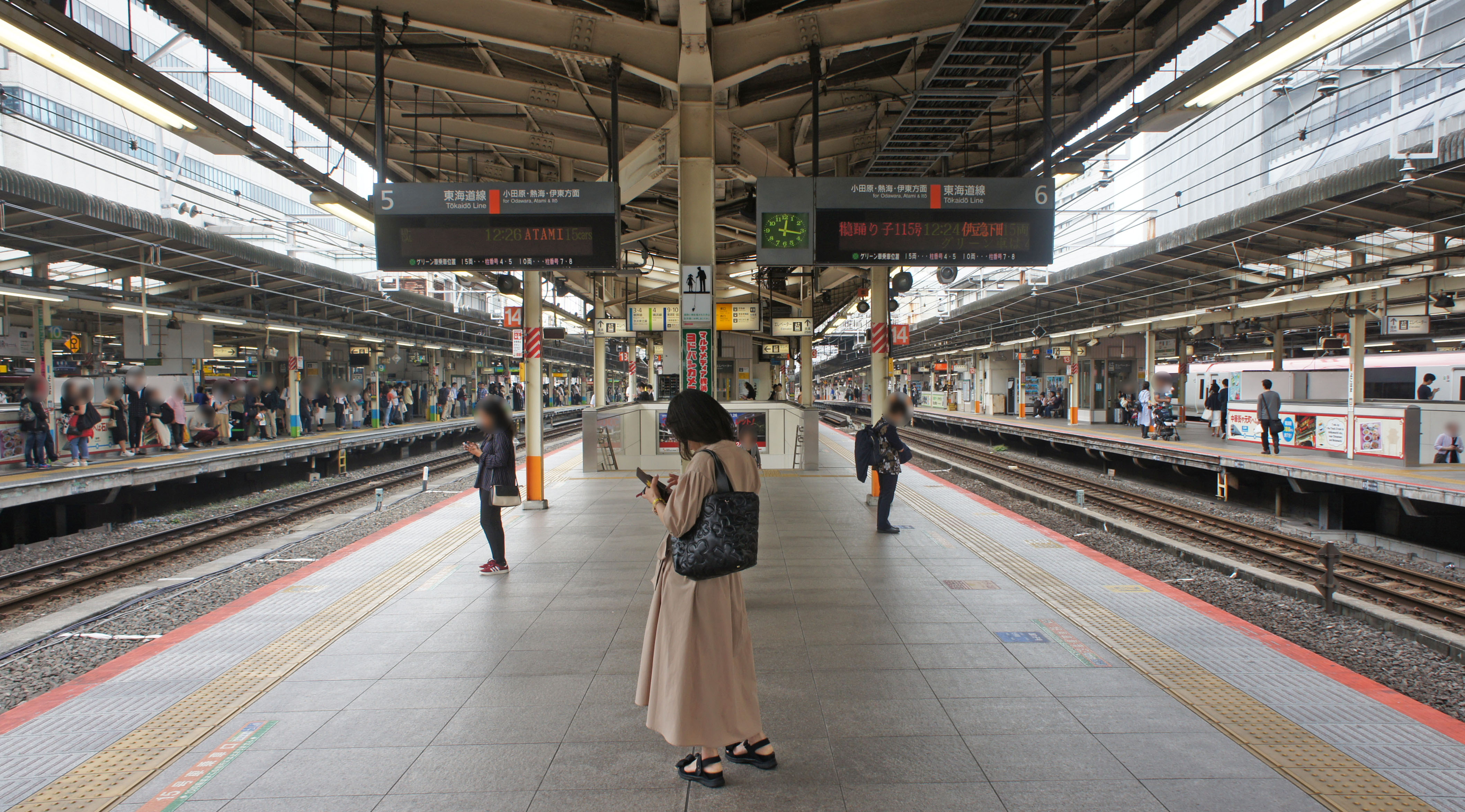
JR platforms 5 and 6

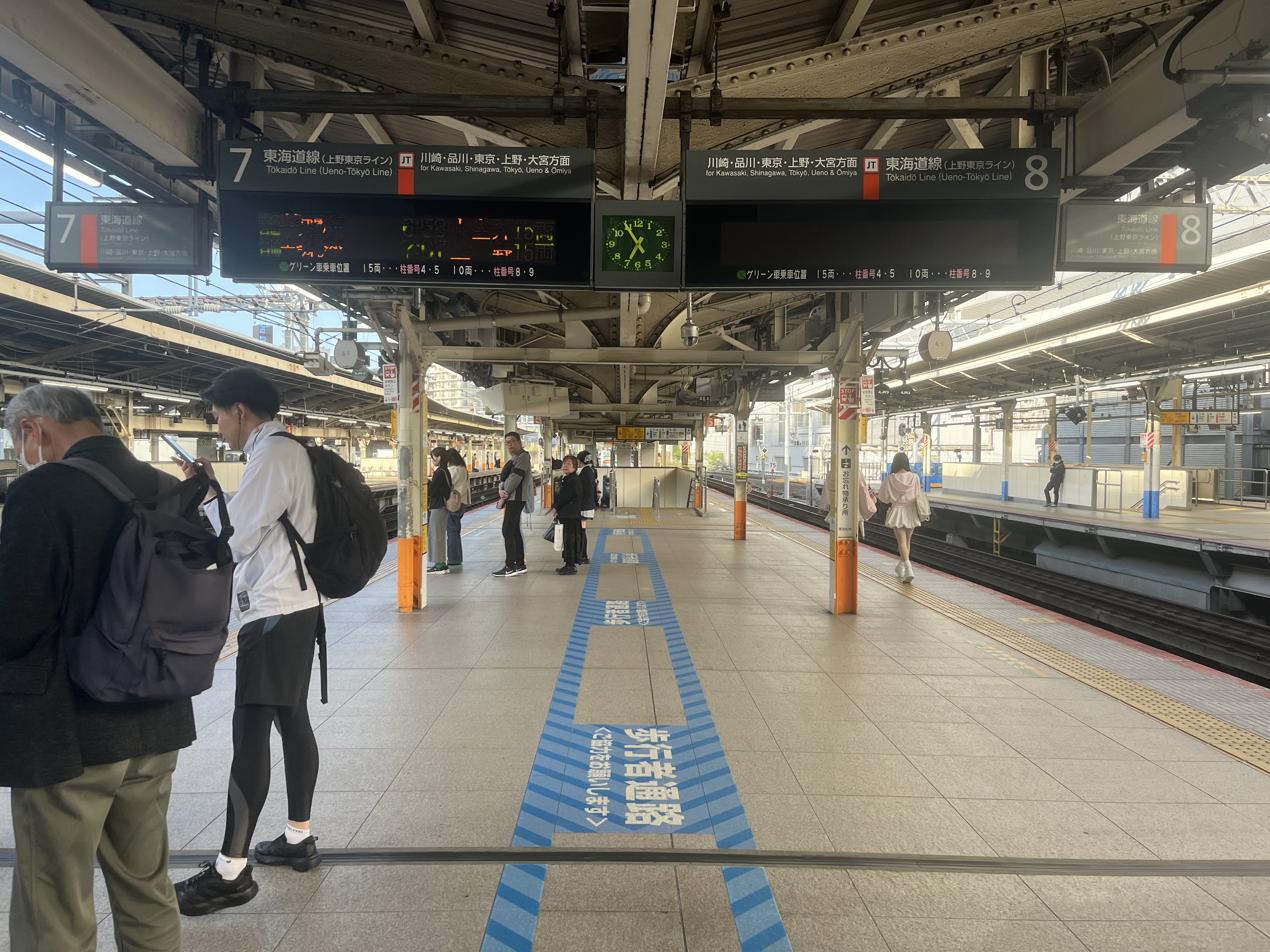
JR platforms 7 and 8

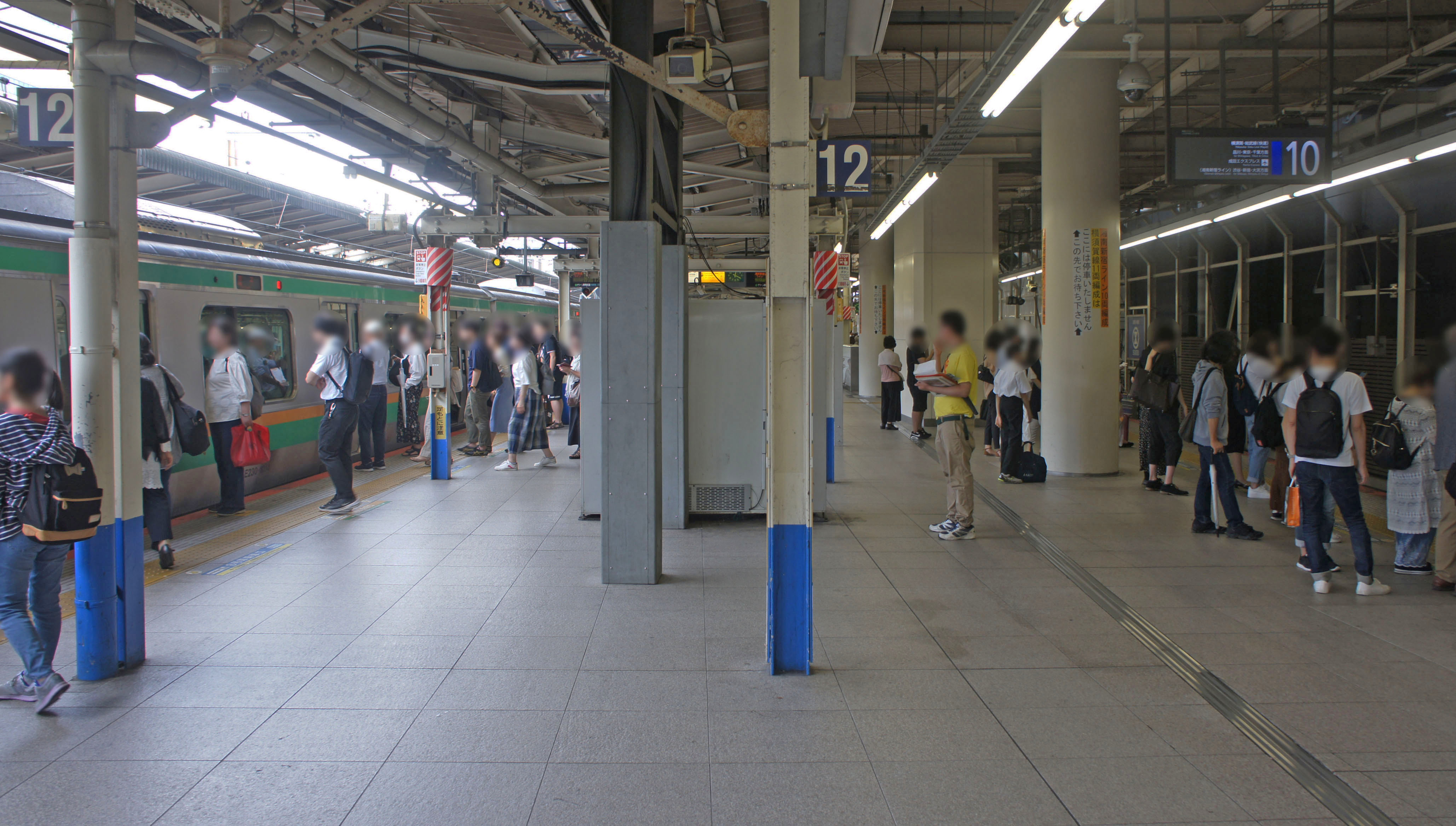
JR platforms 9 and 10

=== Tokyu and Minatomirai ===
Tokyu Corporation and the Yokohama Minatomirai Railway Company share the same underground station located in the 5th underground level of Yokohama Station, to the west of the JR platforms.

1	Minatomirai Line	for Minatomirai and Motomachi-Chūkagai
2	Tōyoko Line	for Musashi-Kosugi, Jiyūgaoka, Naka-Meguro, and Shibuya; Fukutoshin Line for Shinjuku-sanchome, Ikebukuro, Kotake-mukaihara, and Wakoshi; Seibu Ikebukuro Line for Hannō; Tōbu Tōjō Line for Shinrinkōen

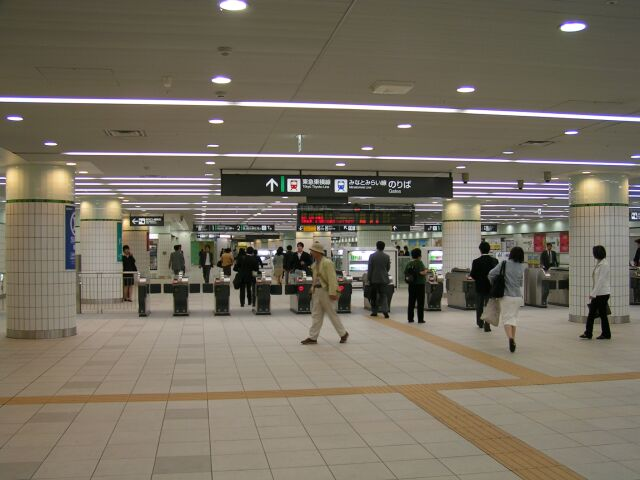
Toyoko Line/Minatomirai Line ticket gates, April 2004

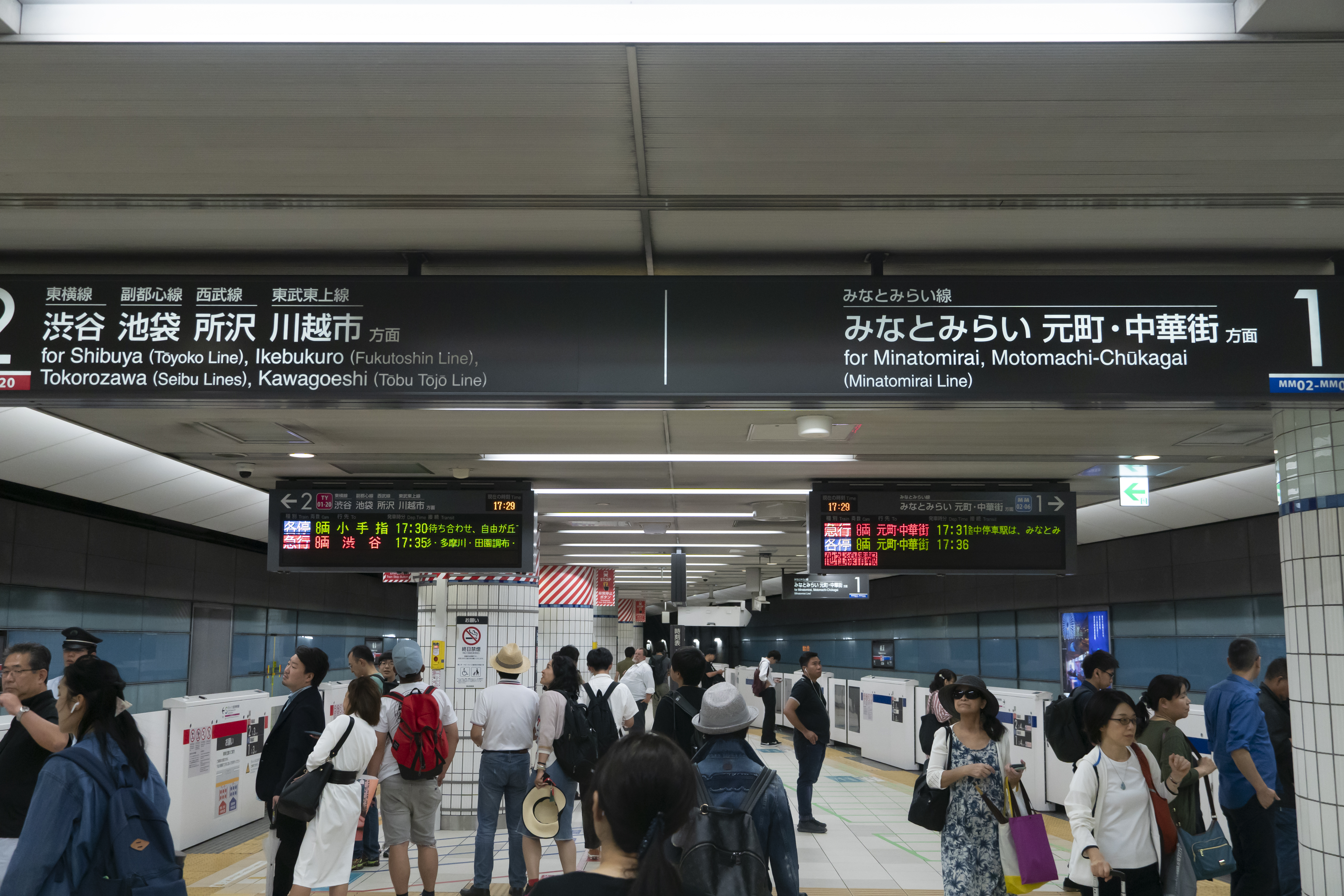
Toyoko Line/Minatomirai Line platform, 2019

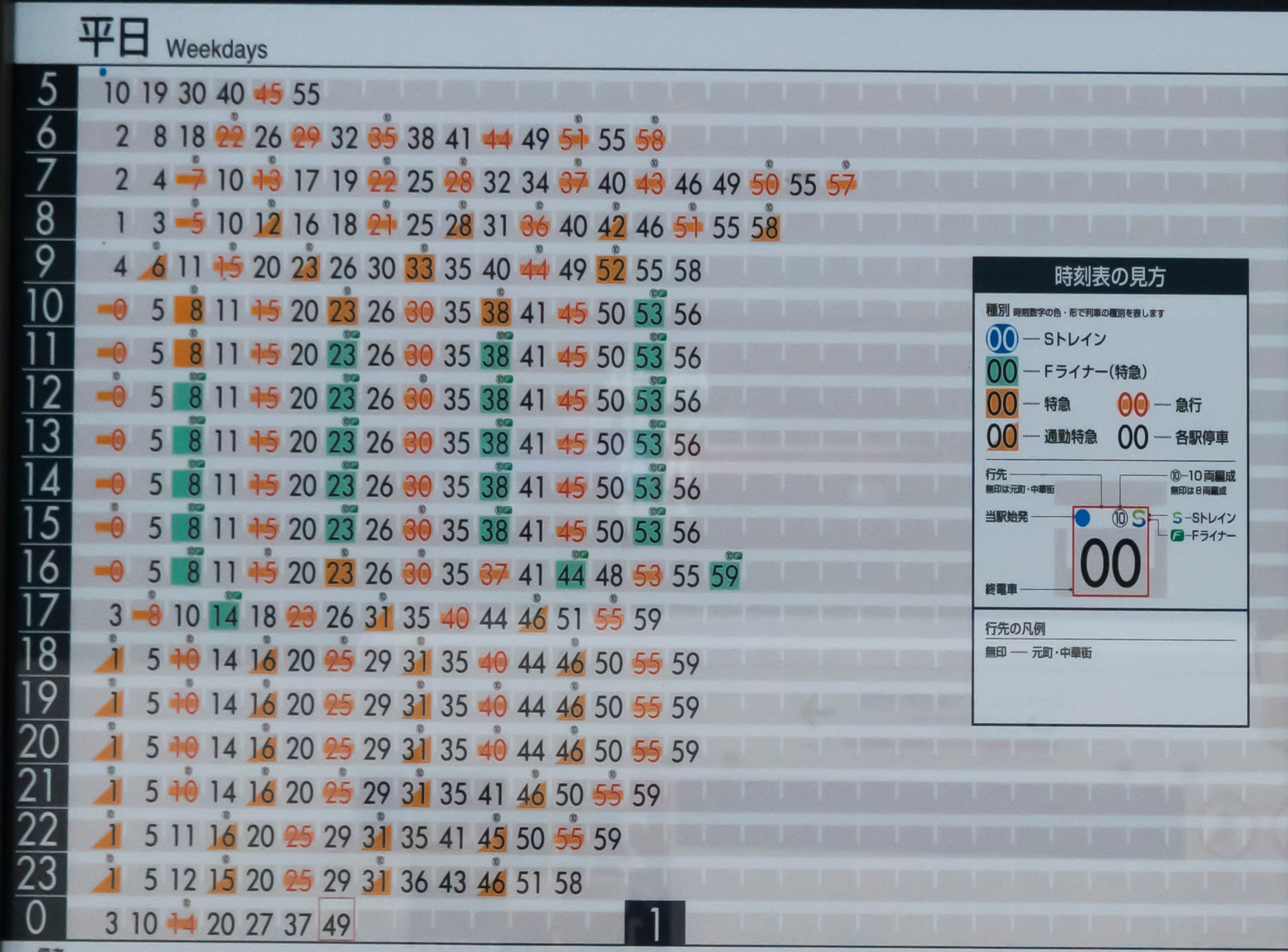
Time table display laying out the weekday schedule.

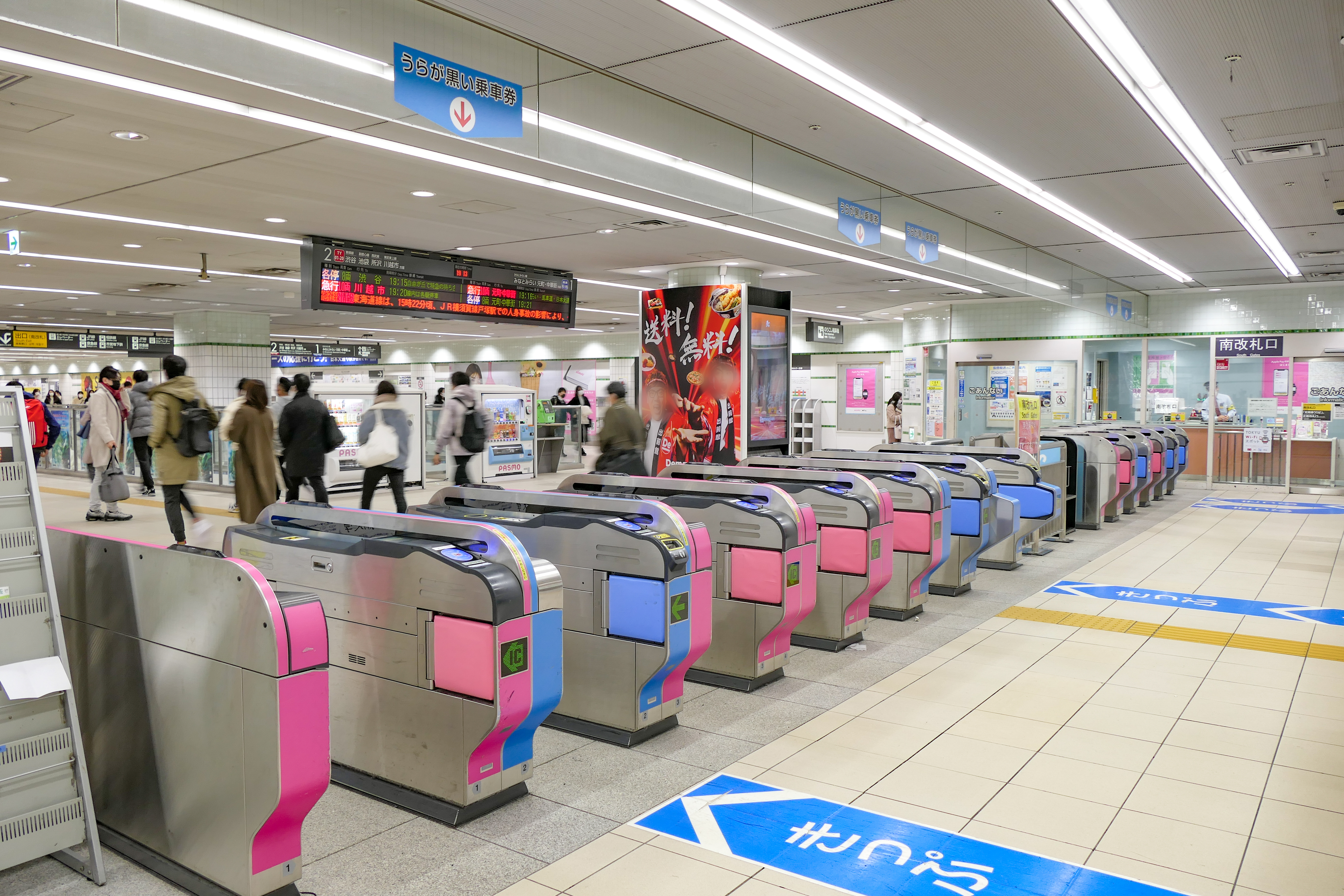
South-Gate

=== Yokohama Municipal Subway ===
The Yokohama Municipal Subway is located on the 3rd basement level, west of the main station.

1	Blue Line	for Sakuragichō, Kannai, Kamiōoka, Shōnandai
2	Blue Line	for Shin-Yokohama, Center-Kita, and Azamino

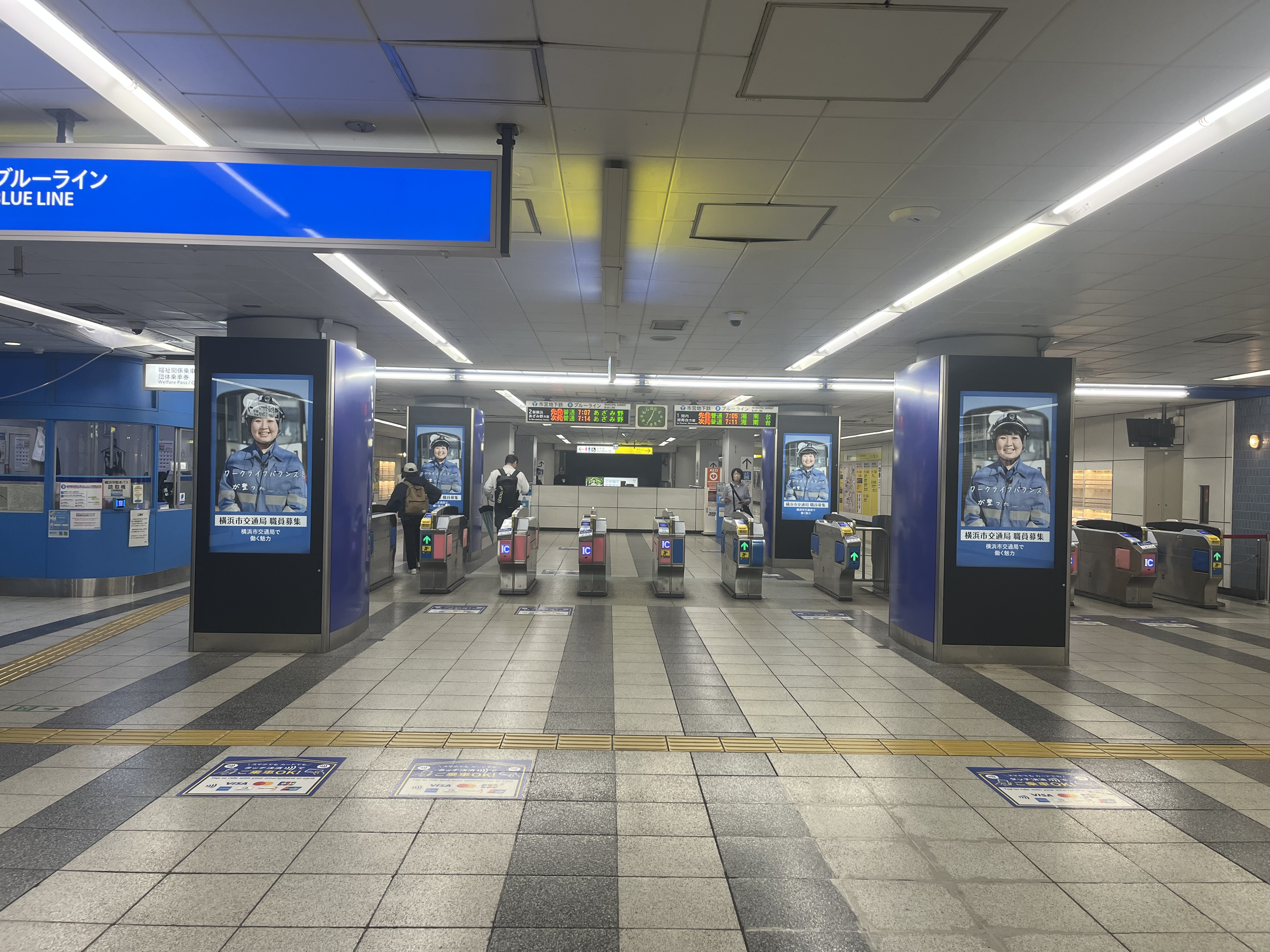
JR・Sotetsu ticket gate

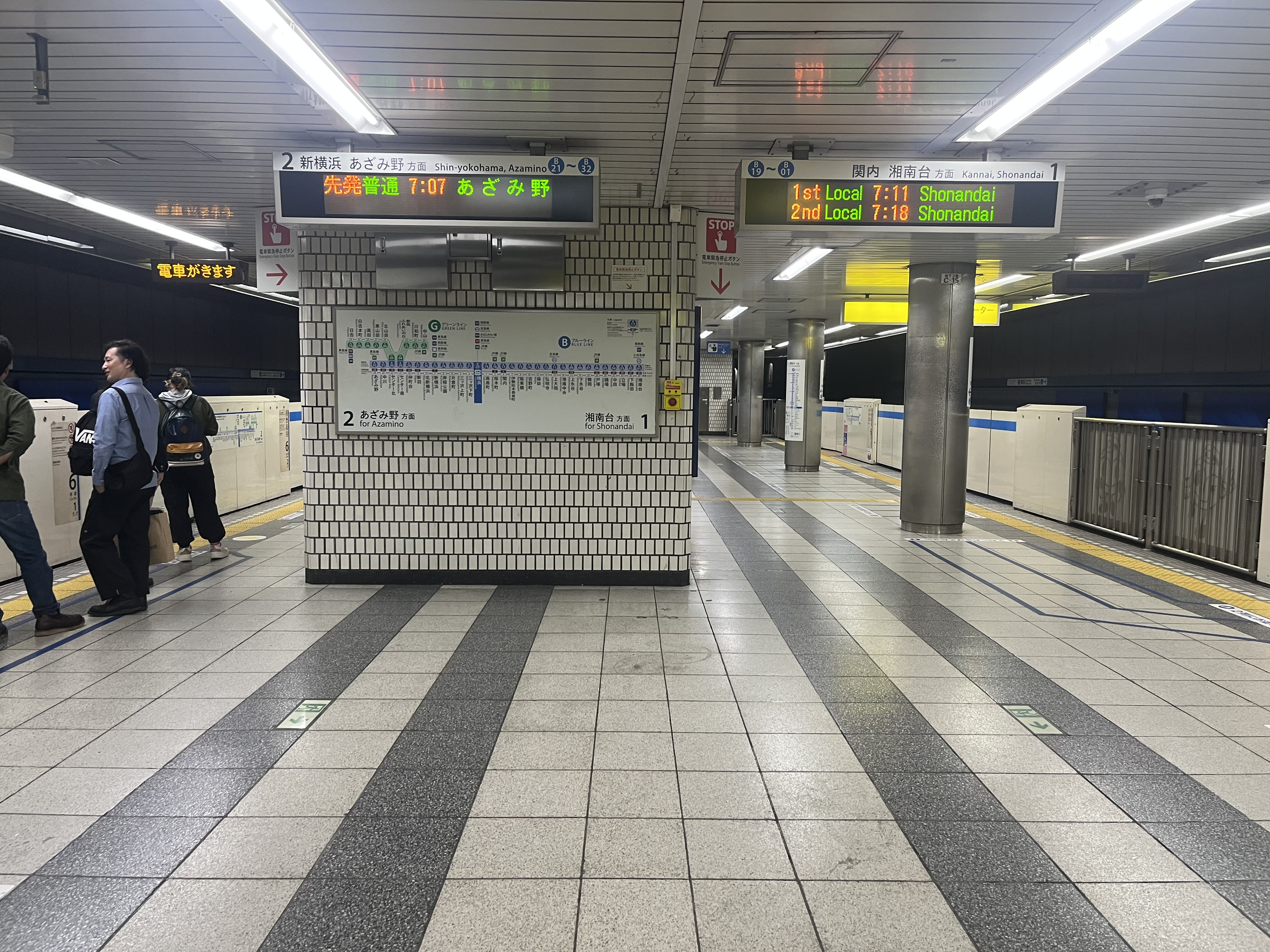
Yokohama Municipal Subway station

=== Sotetsu ===
Sagami Railway is an above-ground structure to the west of the main station, connected to the Sotetsu Department Store.

1-3	Sotetsu Main Line	for Futamata-gawa, Yamato, Ebina, and Shōnandai

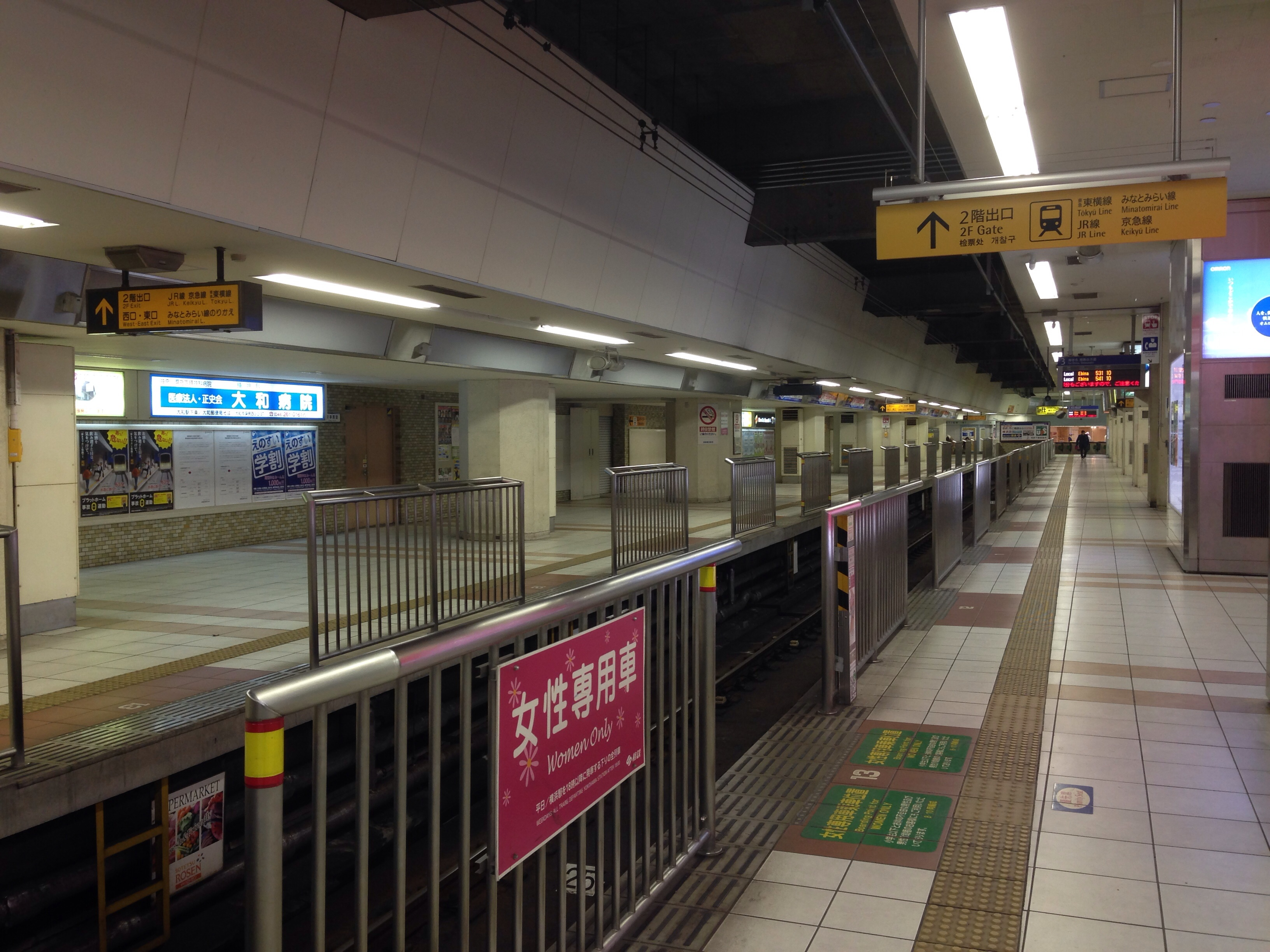
The Sotetsu platforms, February 2014

== Bus services ==
=== Expressway bus (daytime) ===
- Yokohama City Air Terminal
  - For Haneda Airport
  - For Narita Airport
- Eastside bus terminal
  - For Tokyo Disney Resort
  - For JR Gotemba Station (Mount Fuji), Hakone Tōgendai (Lake Ashi)

=== Expressway bus (overnight) ===
- Yokohama City Air Terminal
  - For JR Nagoya Station, JR Okayama Station
- Eastside bus terminal
  - For JR Kyoto Station, JR Ōsaka Station, JR Sendai Station, JR Akita Station

=== Local routes ===
- Yokohama Municipal Bus
- Sotetsu Bus
- Kanachu Bus
- Keikyū Bus

== Surrounding area ==
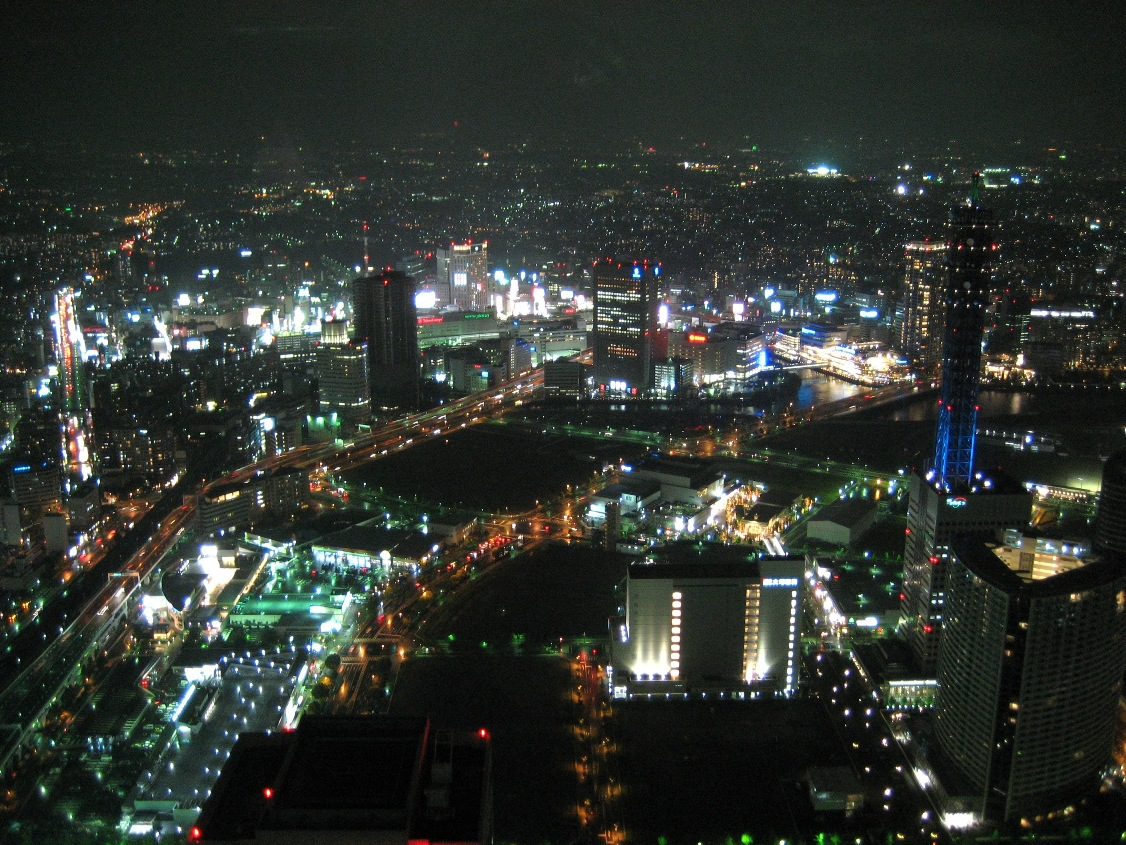
Yokohama Station from Landmark Tower

The west and east have a complex underground business district which spans over several floors and is directly connected with the buildings which surround the station. Yokohama station has three bus terminals, and two other bus terminals are located near the station.

=== East entrance ===
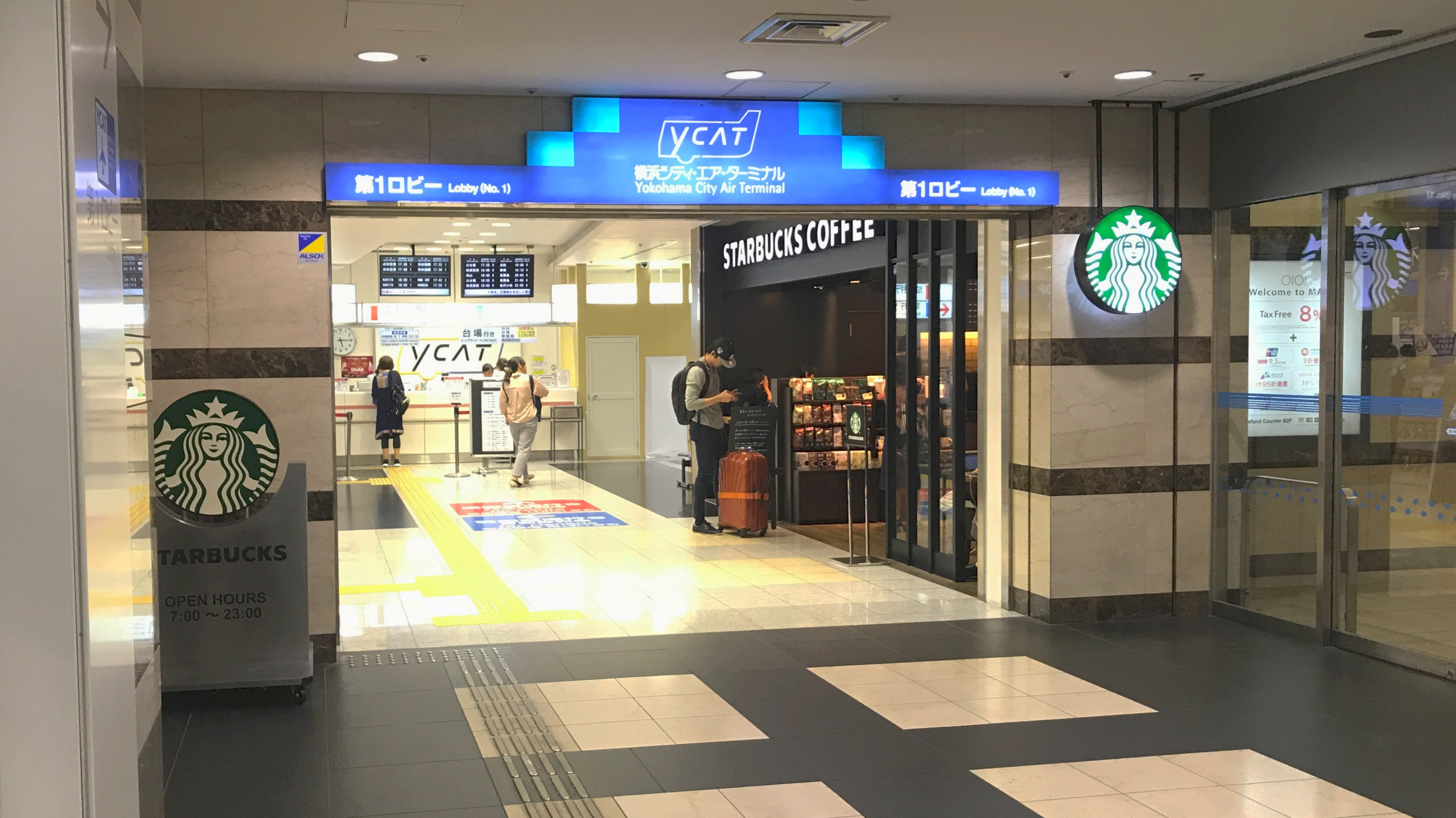
Yokohama City Air Terminal

- Porta (underground shopping mall)
- Sogo (department store, with Yokohama station eastside bus terminal)
- Lumine (shopping building)
- Kiyoken
- Marui (0101) (department store)
- Yokohama Sky Building (with Yokohama City Air Terminal, and its bus terminal)
- Bay Quarter Yokohama (shopping center)
- Yokohama Plaza Hotel
- Yokohama Central Post Office
- The Port Service Yokohama Station East Exit pier
- Horizon Japan International School (HJIS) Yokohama

=== West entrance ===
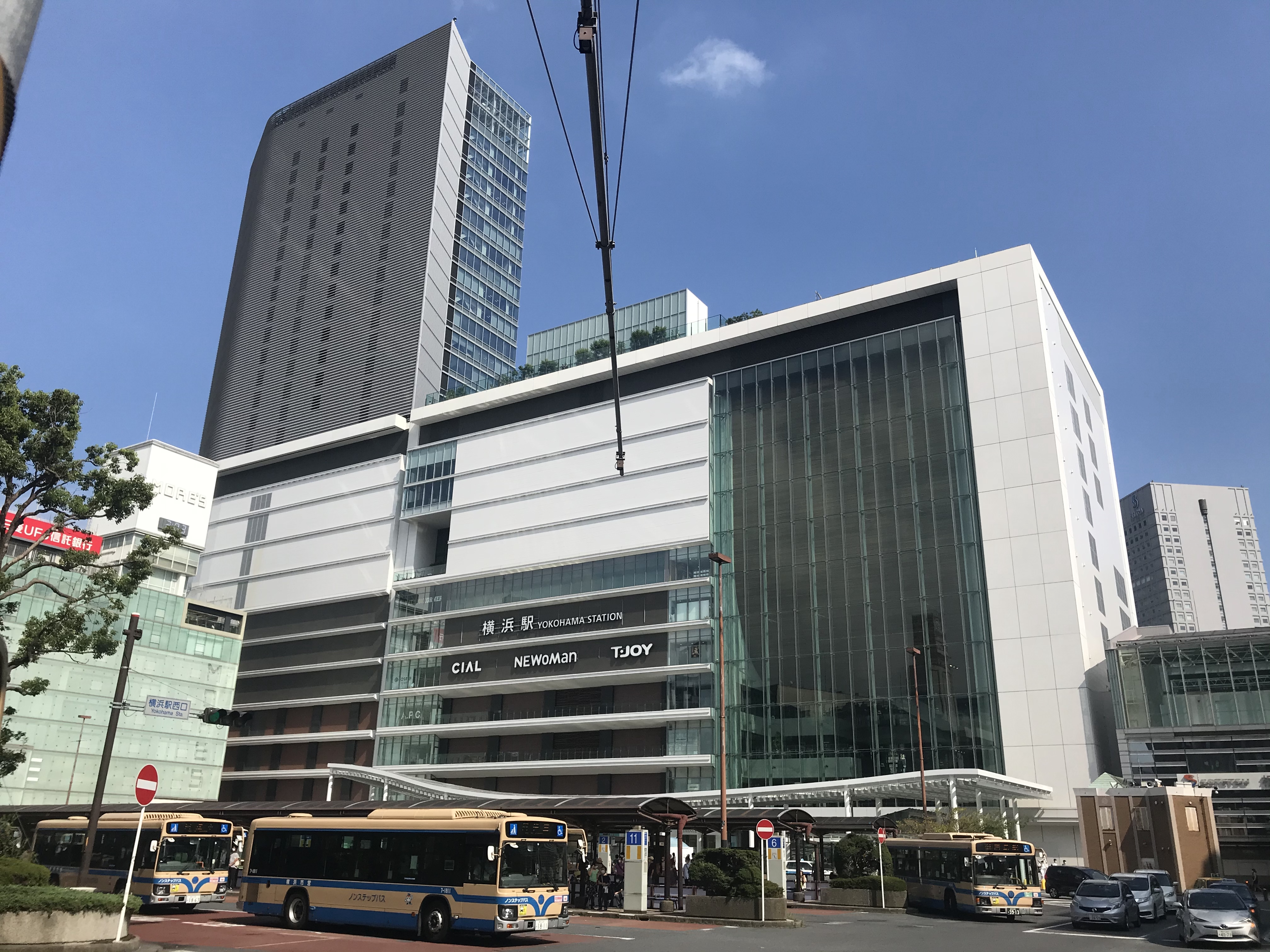
Yokohama Station west exit

- The Diamond (underground shopping mall, and stairs to westside bus terminal)
- Takashimaya (department store)
- CIAL (shopping building : under construction)
- Sotetsu Joinus (shopping building)
- Sotetsu Movil 109 cinemas
- Yokohama station westside second bus terminal
- Yokohama Cinema Society
- Yokohama Excel Hotel Tokyu (under construction)
- Yokohama Bay Sheraton Hotel and Towers
- Yokohama More's (shopping building, with Tokyu Hands Yokohama store)
- Yodobashi Camera Yokohama store
- Bic Camera Yokohama store
- Vivre (shopping building)
- Daiei (supermarket)
- NTT Yokohama East Building

== History ==
=== First station ===
On 7 May 1872 (12 June in Gregorian calendar), Yokohama Station (original station, now Sakuragichō Station) opened as one of the first railway stations in Japan.

On 11 July 1887, the railway was extended from Yokohama to Kōzu Station. Through trains between Shimbashi Station and Kōzu Station required a switchback at Yokohama Station. On 1 August 1898, a line bypassing Yokohama Station was opened to avoid the switchback. Through trains stopped at Kanagawa Station or Hodogaya Station instead of Yokohama Station, and shuttle trains connected Yokohama and Hodogaya until Hiranuma Station opened near present-day Hiranumabashi Station on 10 October 1901. Hiranuma Station had no connection to public transport such as trams, so that major part of the passengers for the city continued to use trains that stopped at Yokohama Station.

=== Second station ===
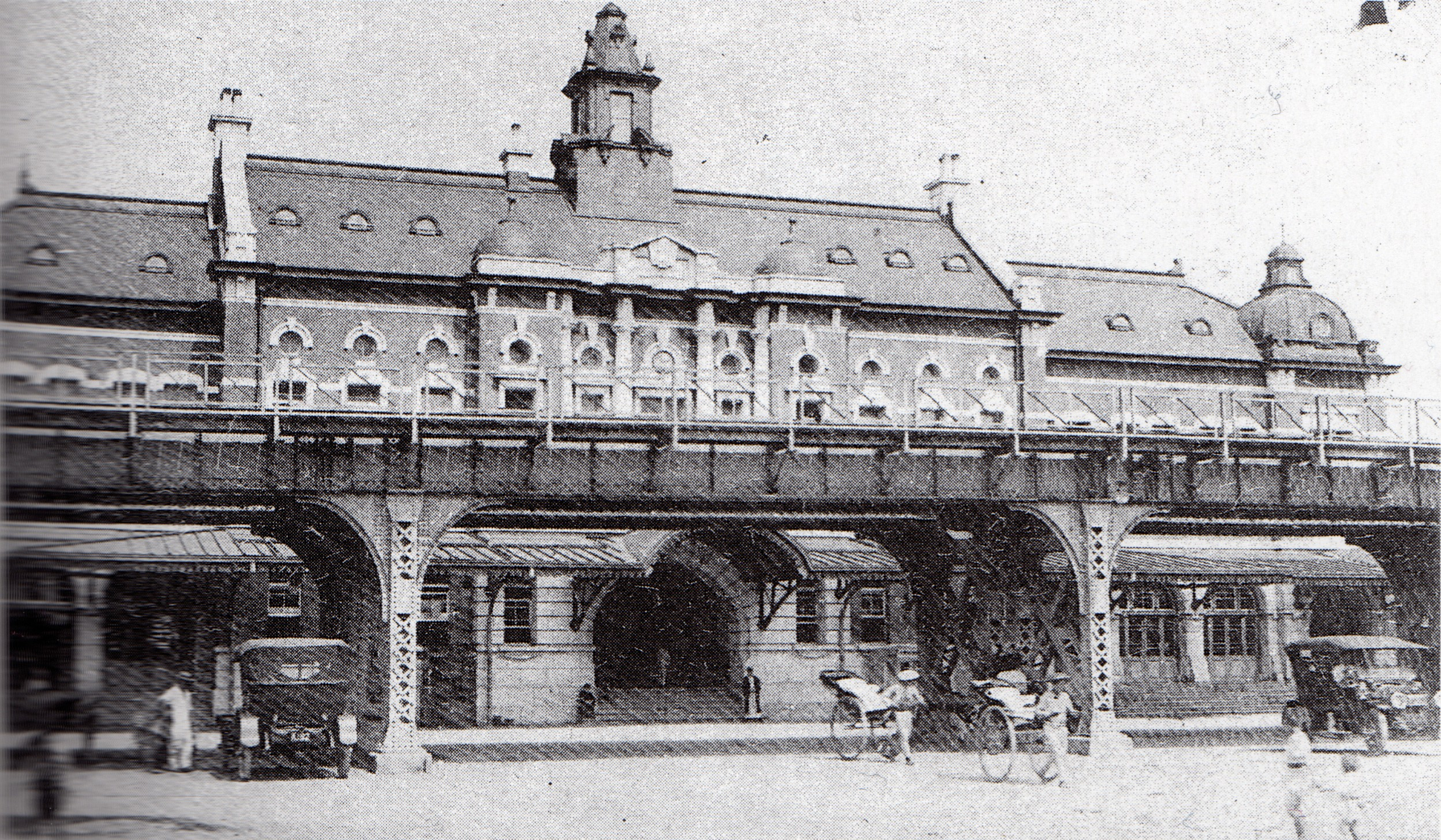
The second station, built in 1915, behind an elevated freight line

On 15 August 1915, the second Yokohama Station opened close to the present day Takashimachō Station to allow Tōkaidō Main Line trains to call at Yokohama Station. The original Yokohama Station was renamed Sakuragichō Station. JR East uses this date as the opening date of the current Yokohama Station. The terminal of the Keihin Line (present-day Keihin-Tōhoku Line) had been in Takashimachō since 1914 and was merged with the new station. The government-run electric line was later that year extended to Sakuragichō.

On 1 September 1923, the station was destroyed by a fire in the 1923 Great Kantō earthquake. Six days later, the station reopened with a temporary building. The city of Yokohama and the Ministry of Railways agreed in February 1924 that the station would be relocated.

On 18 May 1928, the Tokyo Yokohama Railway (now the Tokyu Toyoko Line) was extended from its former terminal at Kanagawa Station to the station. The extension line passed through the construction site of the new Yokohama Station of the government railways.

=== Third station ===
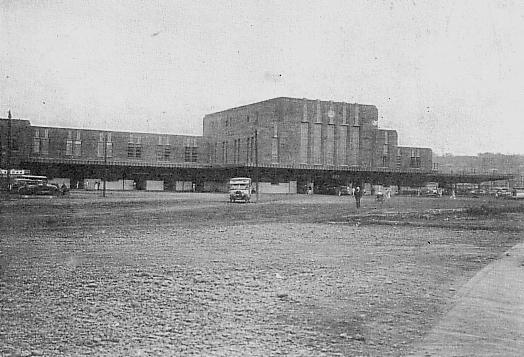
The third station, completed in 1928

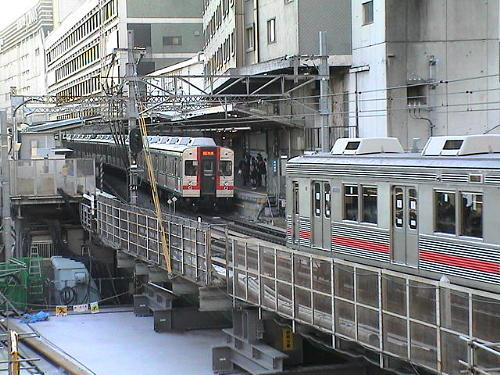
The elevated Toyoko Line platforms, closed in 2004

On 15 October 1928, the third (current) Yokohama Station opened on the north side of the second station. The Tōkaidō Main Line also moved to its current route, which was the route of the bypass line opened in 1898. The government railways and the Toyoko Line shared the station from the beginning. On 5 February 1930, the Keihin Electric Railway (now the Keikyu Main Line) was connected to the station. On 27 December 1933, the Jinchū Railway (now the Sotetsu Main Line) was connected to the station. On 9 December 1957, the north side underground entrance opened. On 1 December 1965, the MARS on-line ticket reservation system was introduced at the station. On 4 September 1976, the Yokohama City Subway Line No. 3 was connected to Yokohama Station. On 7 November 1980, the new east station building and east-west passage opened. On 31 January 2004, The Tōkyū Tōyoko Line platform reopened underground, and on 1 February 2004, the Minatomirai Line opened.

=== 2020 ===
On 26 August 2010, JR East announced the development of a new station building to replace the current West Entrance, tentatively named the Yokohama Station West Station Building (横浜駅 西口駅ビル, Yokohama-eki Nishiguchi-eki biru). It opened in 2020 before the Tokyo 2020 Summer Olympics. The development includes a 26-story retail and office building, Station-front tower (駅前棟, Ekimae-tō), on the site of the current West Entrance and a nine-story building to the north-east, Tsuruya-cho tower (鶴屋町棟, Tsuruyamachi-tō), which includes parking and childcare facilities.

== Passenger statistics ==
In fiscal 2013, the JR East station was used by an average of 406,594 passengers daily (boarding passengers only), making it the busiest JR East station in Kanagawa Prefecture and the fourth-busiest on the JR East network as a whole.

The JR East passenger figures for previous years are as shown below.

Fiscal year	Daily average
2000	385,023
2005	384,594
2010	398,052
2011	394,900
2012	400,655
2013	406,594

== See also ==
- List of East Japan Railway Company stations
